= Northeastern United States =

One of the four census regions of the United States

Coordinates: 42°N 73°W

Northeastern United States The Northeast, The East Coast, The American Northeast
- Region
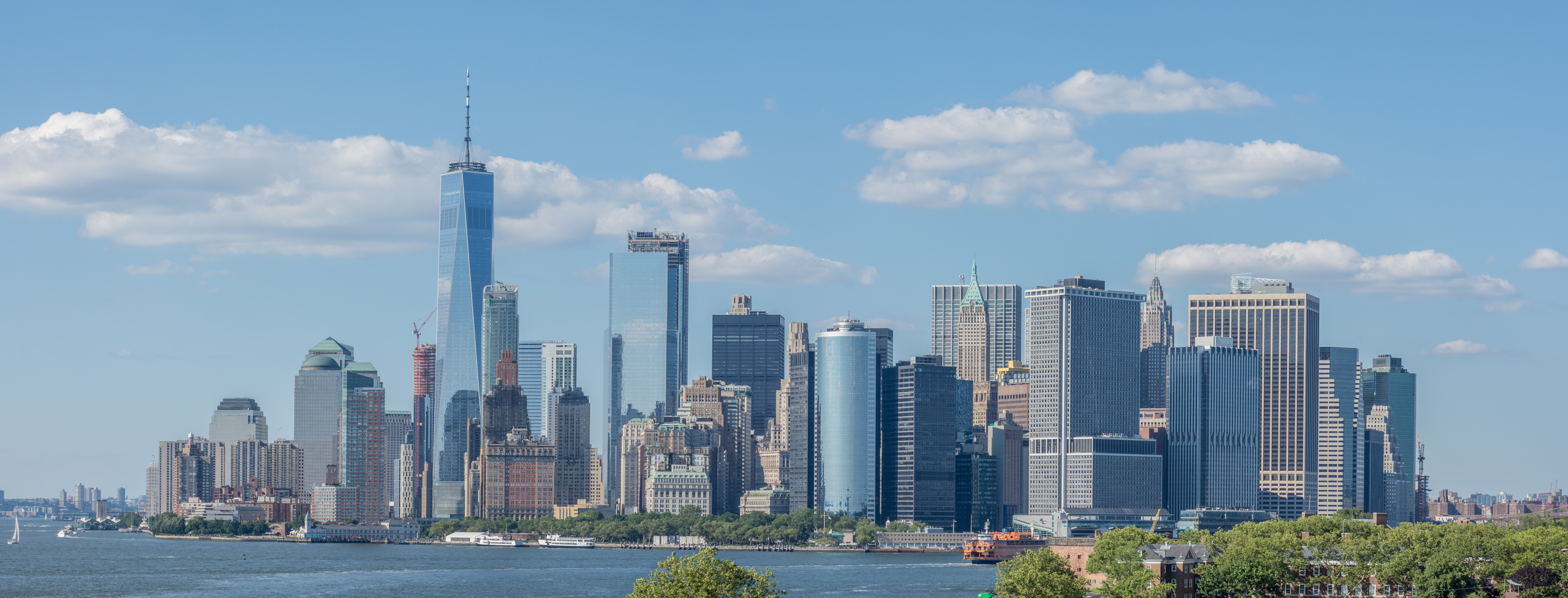
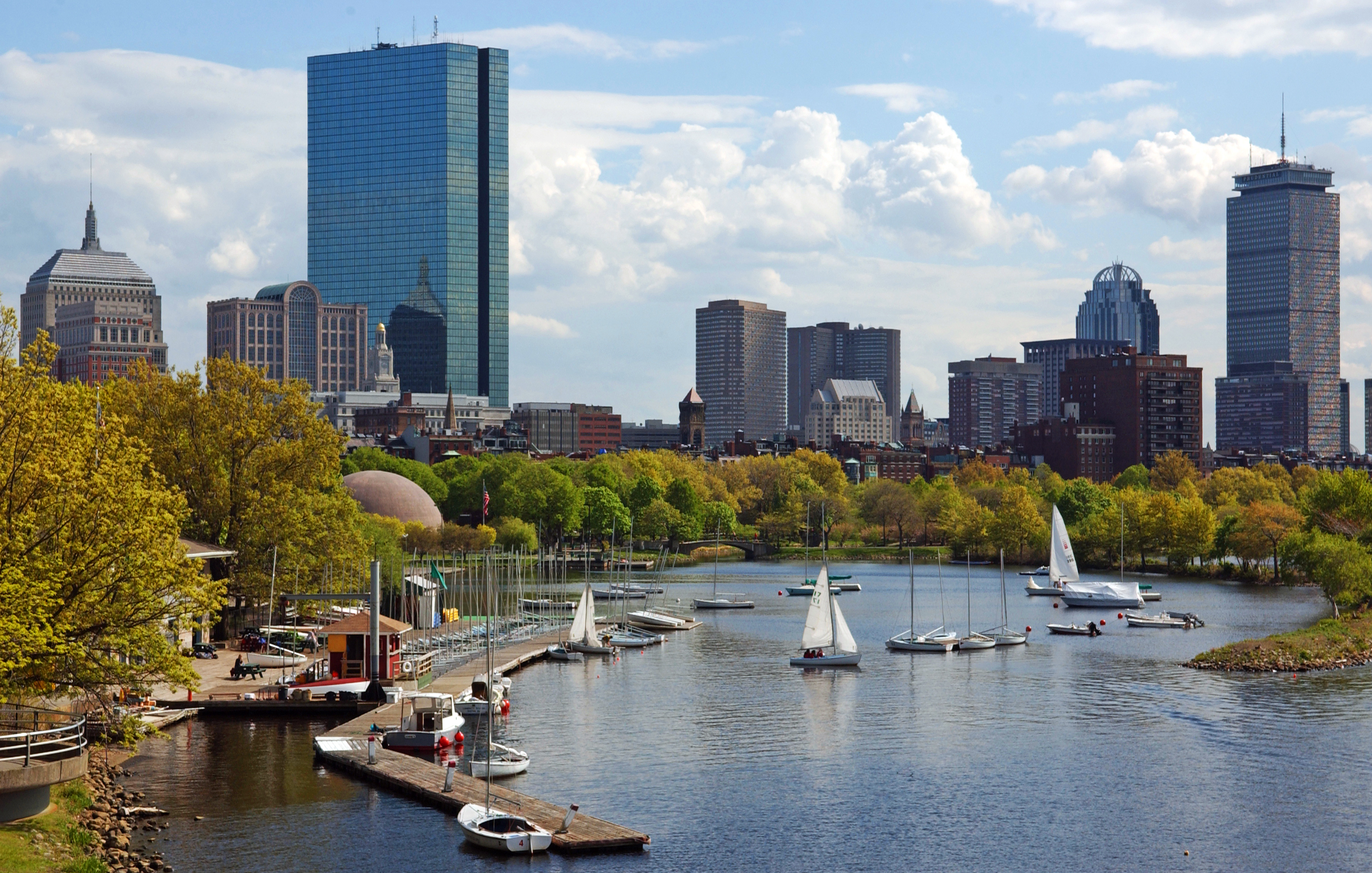
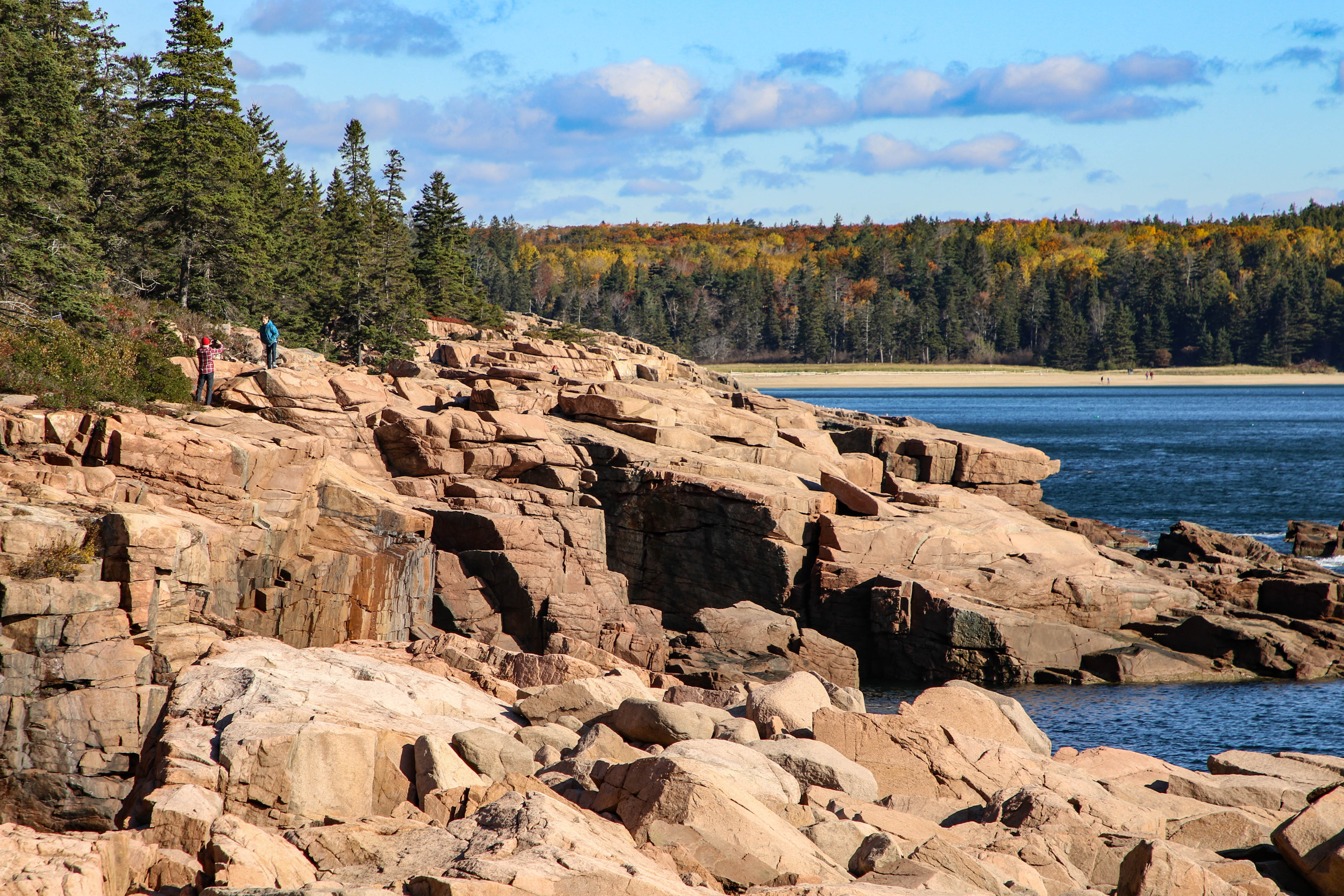
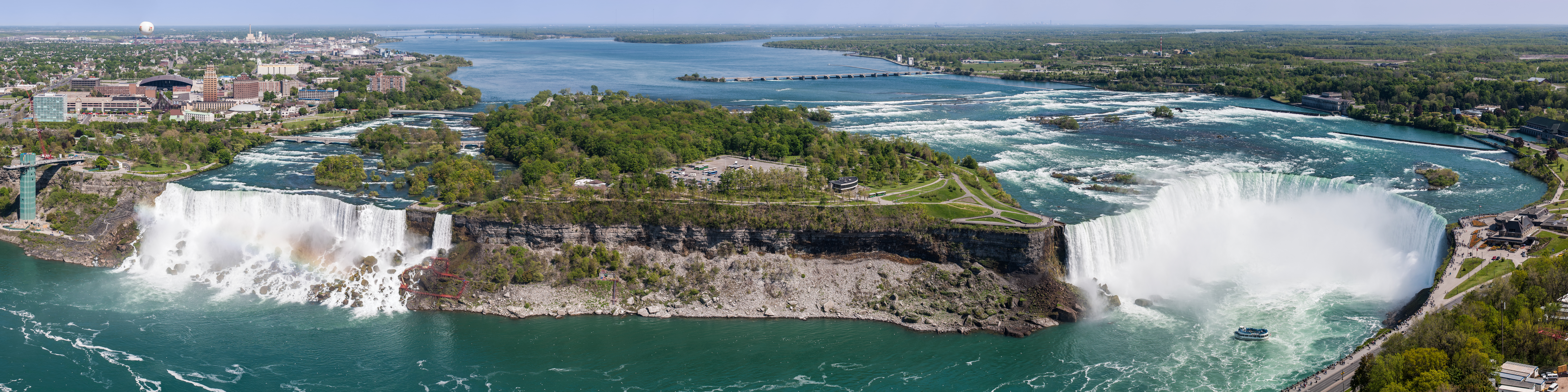
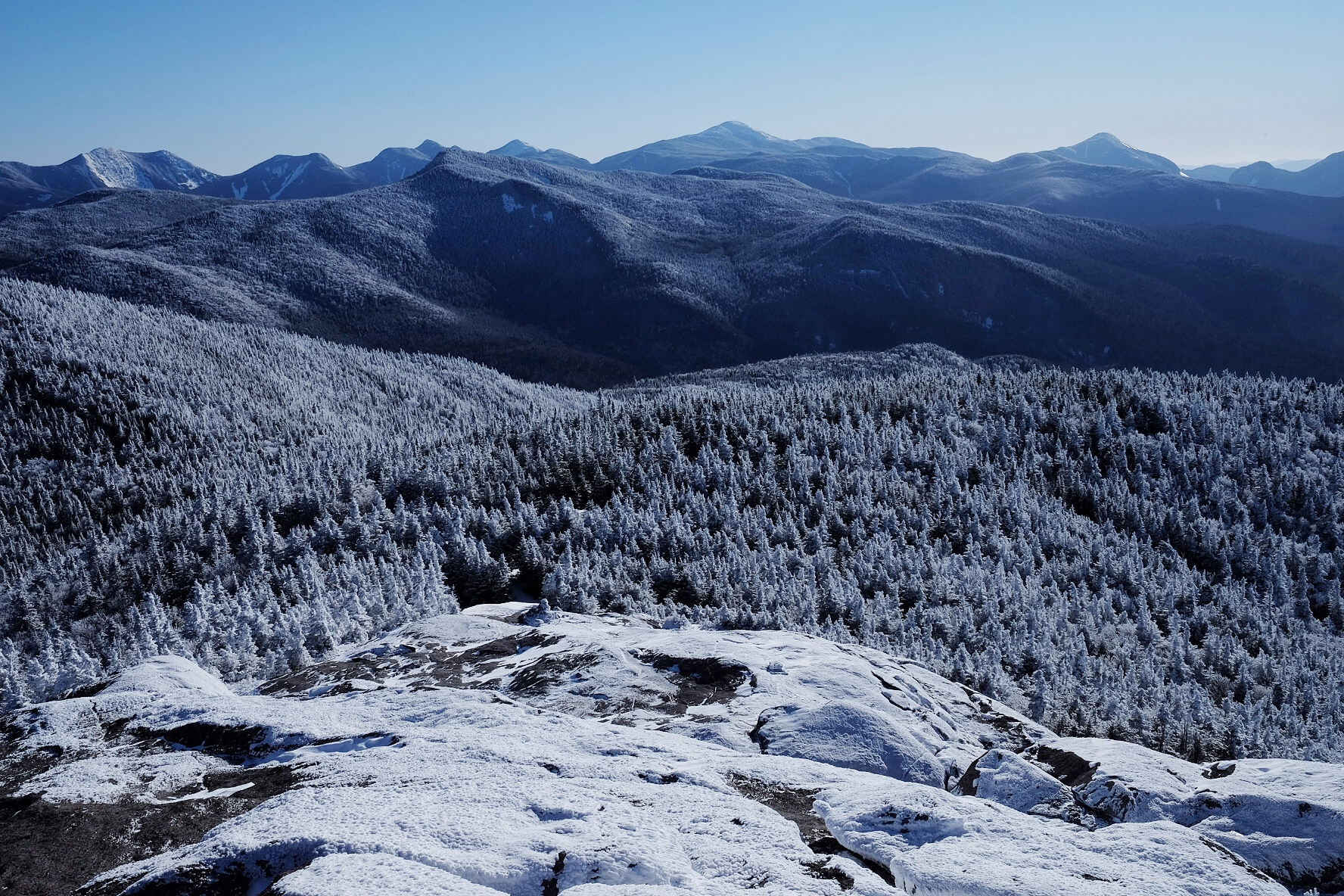
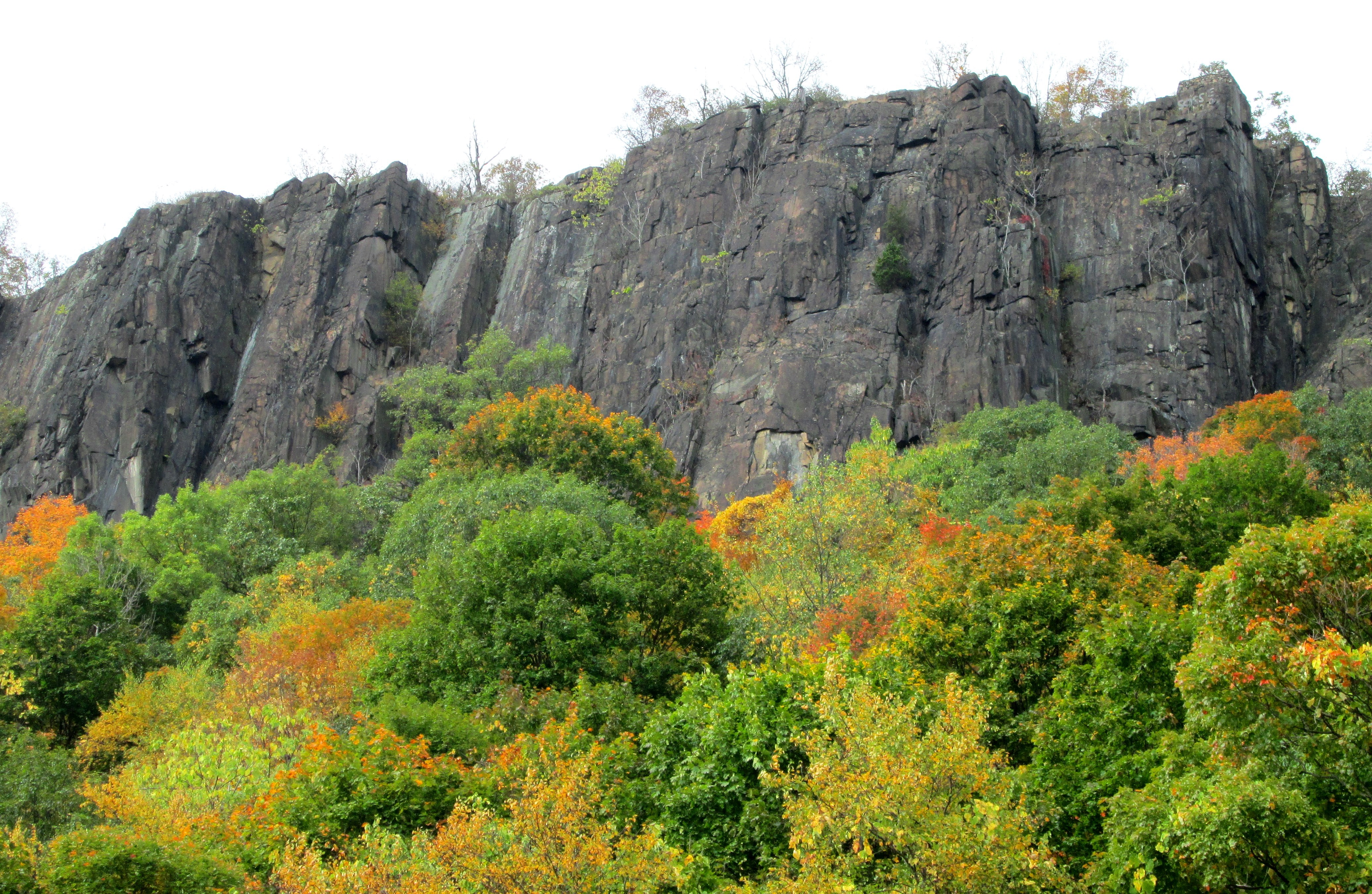
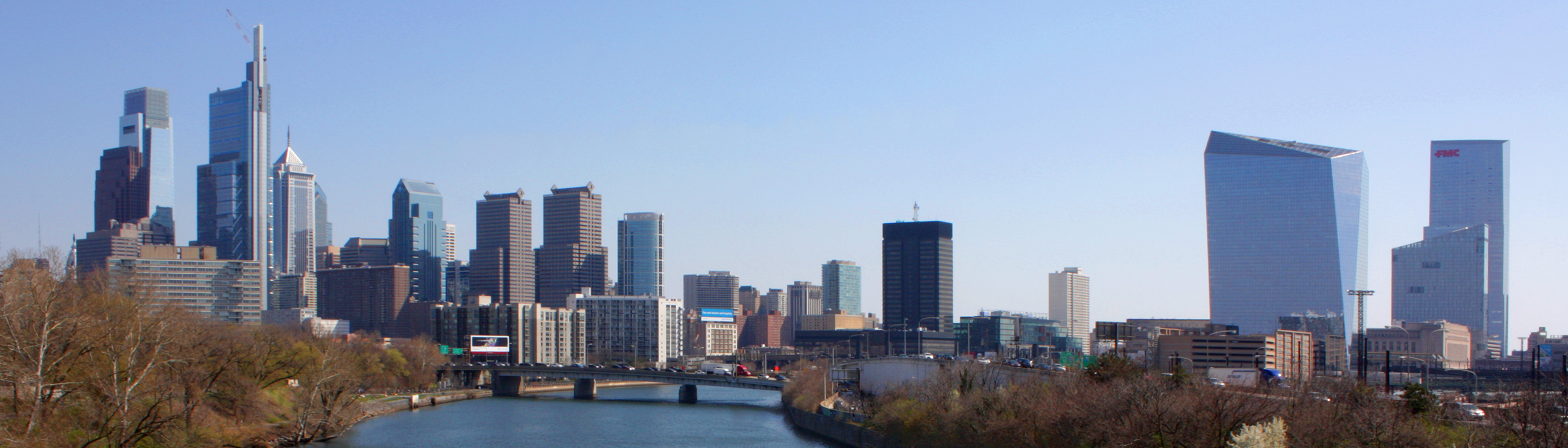
- New York City Boston Acadia National Park Niagara Falls Adirondack Mountains The Palisades Philadelphia

- A map of the Northeastern United States as defined by the Census Bureau
- Subregions: Mid-Atlantic; New England
- Country: United States
- States: Connecticut, Maine, Massachusetts, New Hampshire, New Jersey, New York, Pennsylvania, Rhode Island and Vermont; as defined by the Census Bureau. Regional definitions might vary slightly among sources.

Area
  - Region: 181,324 sq mi (469,630 km^{2})
  - Land: 162,257 sq mi (420,240 km^{2})
  - Water: 19,067 sq mi (49,380 km^{2}) 9.51%
  - Urban: 74,800 sq mi (194,000 km^{2})
- Highest elevation (Mount Washington, New Hampshire (Note: Elevation adjusted to North American Vertical Datum of 1988.)): 6,288.3 ft (1,916.66 m)
- Lowest elevation (Atlantic Ocean): 0 ft (0 m)

Population (2020)
  - Region: 57,609,148
  - Density: 355.049/sq mi (137.085/km^{2})
- Demonym(s): Northeasterner, Yankee

GDP
  - Region: $5.969 trillion (2025)
  - Per capita: $103,604 (2025)
- Time zone: UTC-5 (EST)
  - Summer (DST): UTC-4 (EDT)
- Largest city: New York City

The Northeastern United States (also referred to as the Northeast, the East Coast, (Note: The term "East Coast" is often used to refer to the Northeastern megalopolis. "East Coast" primarily refers to the region between Washington, DC, in the south and Boston in the north.) or the American Northeast) form one of the four census regions defined by the United States Census Bureau. Located on the Atlantic coast of North America, the region borders Canada to its north, the Southern United States to its south, the Midwestern United States to its west, and the Atlantic Ocean to its east.

The Northeast is one of the four regions defined by the U.S. Census Bureau for the collection and analysis of statistics. The Census Bureau defines the region as including the six New England states of Connecticut, Maine, Massachusetts, New Hampshire, Rhode Island, and Vermont, and three lower Northeast states of New Jersey, New York, and Pennsylvania. Some expanded definitions of the region include Mid-Atlantic locations such as Delaware, Maryland, Northern Virginia, and Washington, D.C.

The region is the base for the Northeast megalopolis, which includes many of the nation's largest metropolitan areas, including New York City, Philadelphia, and Boston. The megalopolis makes up 67% of the region's total population of 57,609,148. The gross domestic product of the region was $5.1 trillion as of 2022 and contains some of the most developed states based on the Human Development Index, with every state above the national average. It is also the most densely populated region in the United States, with 320 people per square mile (120 people/km^{2}). The U.S. Census Bureau defines the Northeast United States as having a total area of 181,324 mi^{2} (469,630 km^{2}), making it the smallest region of the United States by total area. The coastal waters of the Northeast megalopolis constitute one of the fastest-warming urban ocean shorelines in the world.

== History ==
=== Indigenous people ===
Anthropologists recognize the "Northeastern Woodlands" as one of the cultural regions that existed in the Western Hemisphere at the time of European colonists in the 15th and later centuries. Most did not settle in North America until the 17th century. The cultural area, known as the "Northeastern Woodlands", in addition to covering the entire Northeast U.S., also covered much of what is now Canada and other regions of what is now the eastern United States.

Among the many tribes inhabiting this area were those that made up the Iroquois nations and the numerous Algonquian peoples. In the United States of the 21st century, 18 federally recognized tribes reside in the Northeast. For the most part, the people of the Northeastern Woodlands, on whose lands European fishermen began camping to dry their codfish in the early 1600s, lived in villages, especially after being influenced by agricultural traditions of the Ohio and Mississippi valley societies.

=== Colonial history ===
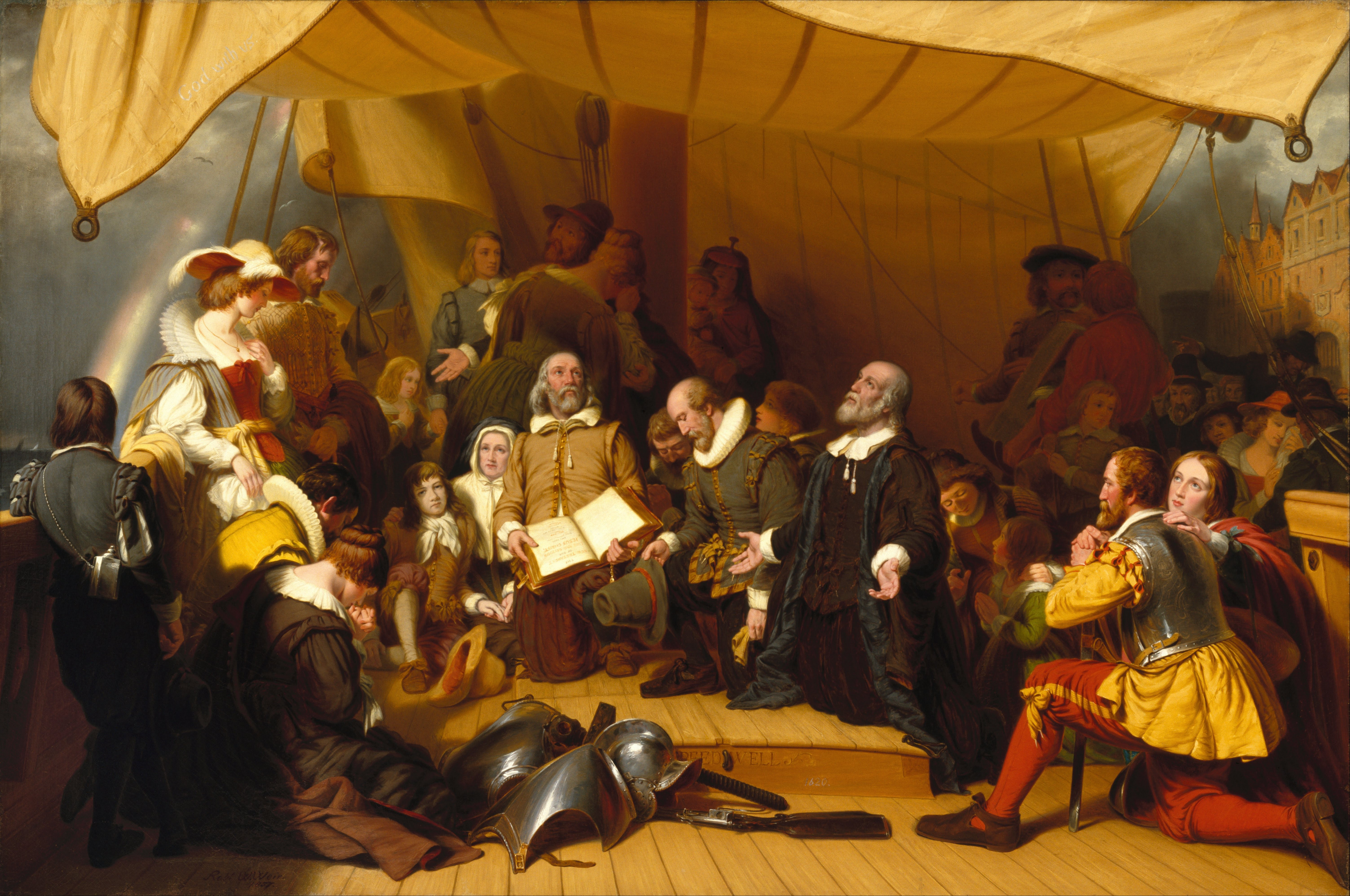
Embarkation of the Pilgrims, an 1857 portrait by Robert Walter Weir

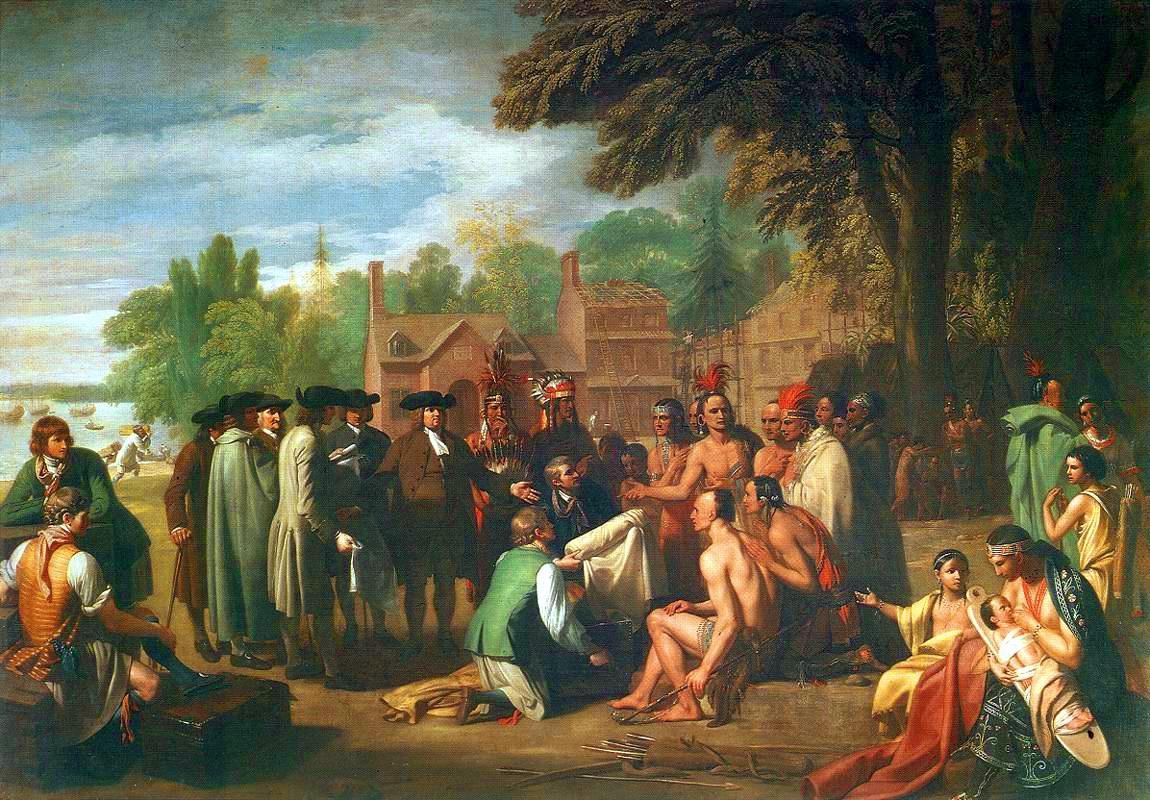
Penn's Treaty with the Indians, a 1772 portrait by Benjamin West

All of the U.S. states making up the Northeastern region were among the original Thirteen Colonies, though Maine and Vermont were part of other colonies before the United States became independent in the American Revolution. The two cultural and geographic regions that form parts of the Northeastern region have distinct histories. The first European explorer known to have explored the Atlantic shoreline of the Northeast since the Norse was Giovanni da Verrazzano in 1524. His ship La Dauphine explored the coast from what is now known as Florida to New Brunswick.

The first Europeans to settle and colonize New England were Pilgrims from England, who landed in present-day Massachusetts in 1620. The Pilgrims arrived on the ship Mayflower and founded Plymouth Colony so they could practice religion freely. Ten years later, a larger group of Puritans settled north of Plymouth Colony in Boston to form Massachusetts Bay Colony. In 1636, colonists established Connecticut Colony and Providence Plantations.

Providence was founded by Roger Williams, who was banished by Massachusetts for his beliefs in freedom of religion, and it was the first colony to guarantee all citizens freedom of worship. Anne Hutchinson, who was also banished by Massachusetts, formed the town of Portsmouth. Providence, Portsmouth and two other towns (Newport and Warwick) consolidated to form the Colony of Rhode Island and Providence Plantations.

Henry Hudson explored the area of present-day New York in 1609 and claimed it for the Netherlands. His journey stimulated Dutch interest, and the area became known as New Netherland. In 1625, the city of New Amsterdam (the location of present-day New York City) was designated the capital of the province. The Dutch New Netherland settlement along the Hudson River and, for a time, the New Sweden settlement along the Delaware River divided the English settlements in the north and the south. In 1664, Charles II of England formally annexed New Netherland and incorporated it into the English colonial empire. The territory became the colonies of New York and New Jersey. New Jersey was originally split into East Jersey and West Jersey until the two were united as a royal colony in 1702.

New England played a prominent role in early American education. Starting in the 17th century, the larger towns in New England opened grammar schools, the forerunner of the modern high school. The first public school in the English colonies was the Boston Latin School, founded in 1635. In 1636, the colonial legislature of Massachusetts founded Harvard College, the oldest institution of higher learning in the United States.

In 1681, William Penn, who wanted to give Quakers a land of religious freedom, founded Pennsylvania and extended freedom of religion to all citizens.

Penn strongly desired access to the sea for the Province of Pennsylvania and leased what then came to be known as the "Lower Counties on the Delaware" from the Duke. Penn established representative government and briefly combined his two possessions under one General Assembly in 1682.

By 1704, the province of Pennsylvania had grown so large that their representatives wanted to make decisions without the assent of the Lower Counties and the two groups of representatives began meeting on their own, one at Philadelphia, and the other at New Castle, Delaware. Penn and his heirs remained proprietors of both and always appointed the same person Governor for their province of Pennsylvania and their territory of the Lower Counties. The fact that Delaware and Pennsylvania shared the same governor was not unique. From 1703 to 1738, both New York and New Jersey shared a governor. Massachusetts and New Hampshire also shared a governor for some time.

=== American Revolution ===
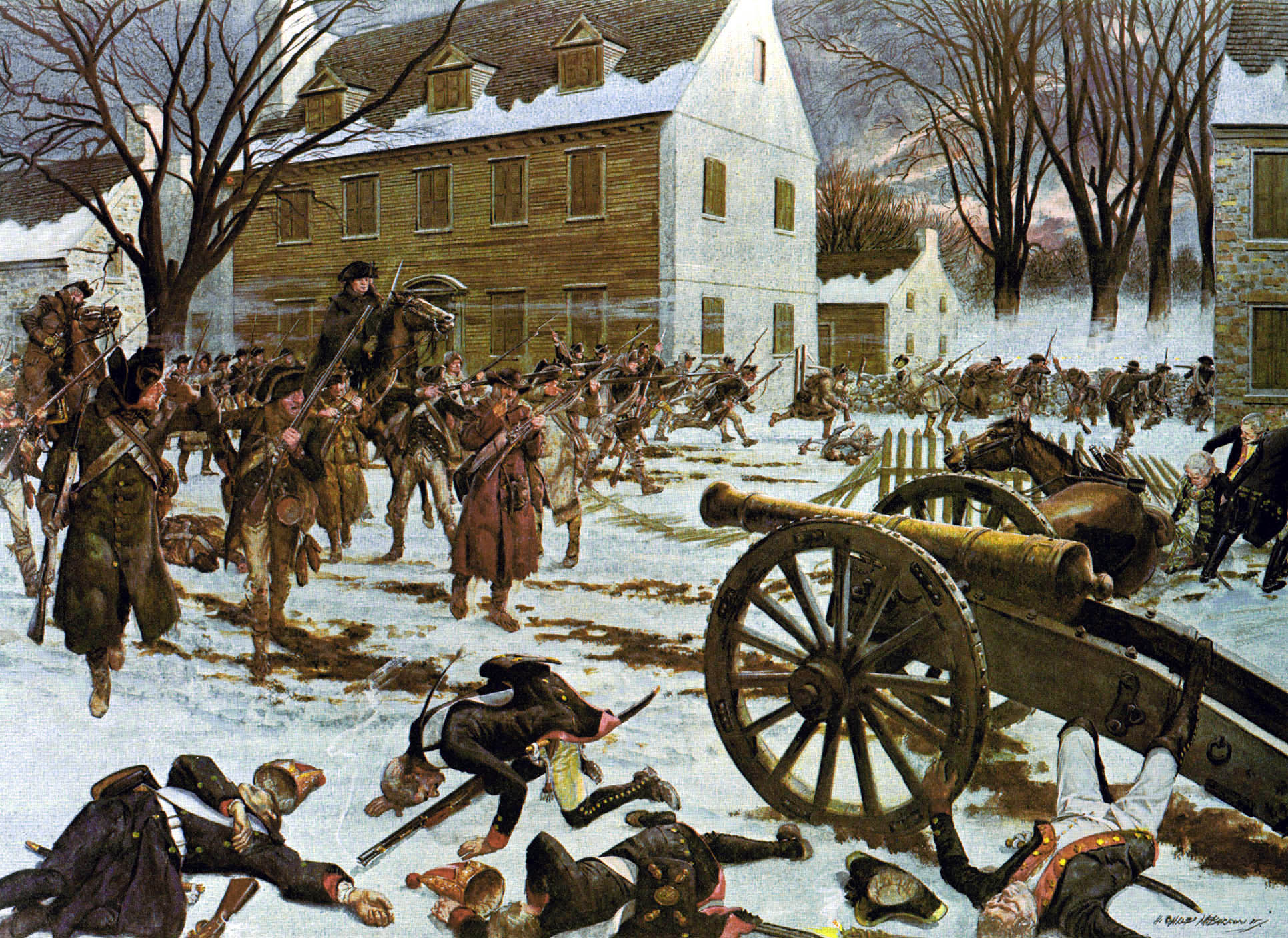
The Battle of Trenton, fought in New Jersey in December 1776 following Washington's covert crossing of the Delaware during the night of December 25, 1776, represented an inspiring victory for Washington's Continental Army and began to turn the Revolutionary War in the Americans' favor.

The beginnings of the American Revolutionary War were in the Northeast, specifically in Massachusetts. The Battles of Lexington and Concord in northeast of Boston were the first military engagements between the Revolutionaries and the British. Many of the major battles of the revolution were fought in the Northeast. The British evacuated Boston in early 1776 and moved to capture New York City.

The revolutionaries were pushed to the Delaware River before suddenly moving forward against the British in the Battles of Trenton and Princeton. A stalemate was reached in 1778, between the British and American Revolutionaries and continued until the end of the war in 1783. The war moved to southern states and eventually conclude with the Battle of Yorktown in Virginia.

==== Formation of the United States of America ====
The idea of an independent United States of America, with the designs of its government, was created primarily in the Northeast in a series of declarations, constitutions, and documents. The Continental Congresses met in Philadelphia, which produced the Declaration of Independence and the Articles of Confederation. Following the American Revolution, the capital of the newly formed United States moved around in the states of Pennsylvania, New Jersey, and New York. It was based in New York City from 1785 until 1790, when it was moved to Congress Hall in Philadelphia, where it remained for a decade, until 1800, when the construction of the new national capital of Washington, D.C. was completed.

The Constitutional Convention was held in Philadelphia, where the new United States Constitution was drafted in 1787. Six of the first 13 states to ratify the new constitution were in the Northeast, with the last of the original 13, Rhode Island, ratifying the constitution in 1790. Vermont was admitted in 1791 as the 14th state. The first Congress convened in Federal Hall in New York City in March 1789.

=== Early and mid-19th century ===
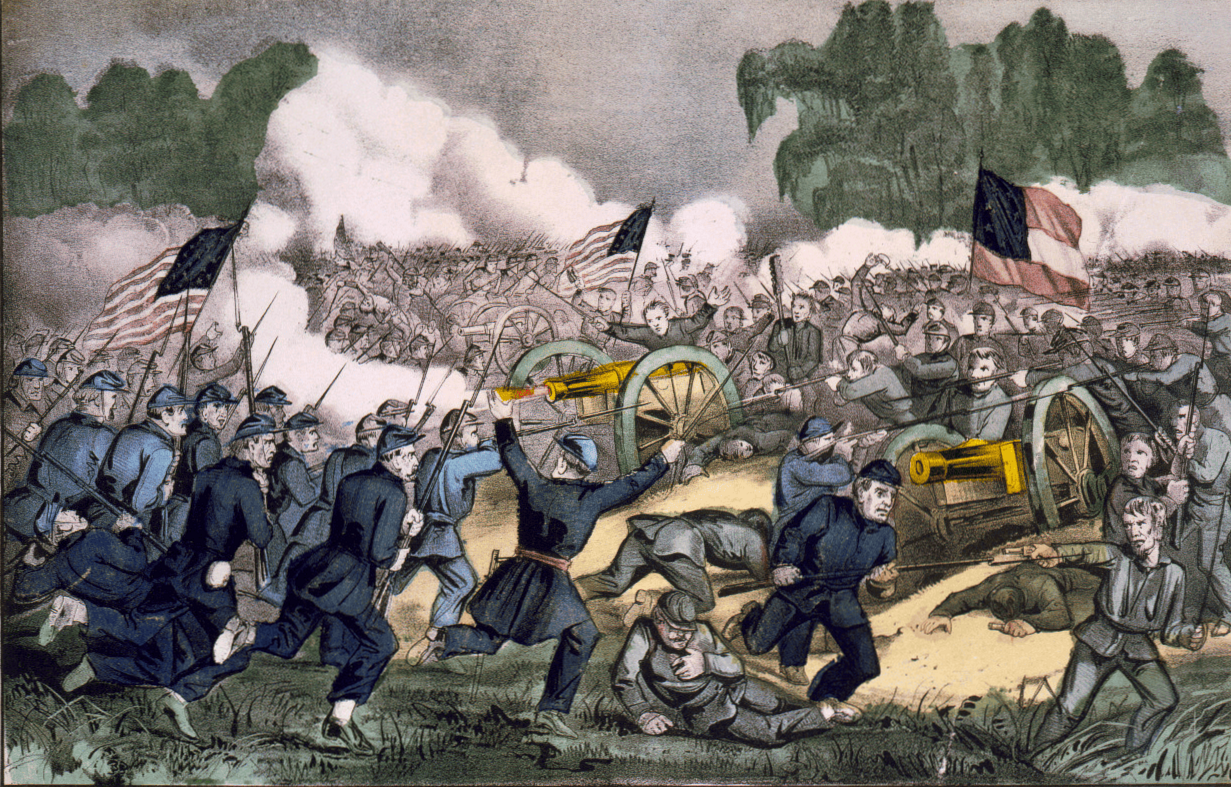
The Battle of Gettysburg, fought in and around Gettysburg, Pennsylvania, was the American Civil War's bloodiest battle; the Union's victory at Gettysburg represented a turning point in the war in the Union's favor.

Following the revolution the Northeast saw small skirmishes like the Whiskey Rebellion in western parts of Pennsylvania. Many northeastern states continued trading with the British and other European powers. Tensions between the United States and Europe (specifically Britain) soured in the lead-up to the War of 1812.

This caused certain trade merchants to meet in Hartford to propose seceding from the United States. The War of 1812 saw less fighting in the Northeast and instead more fighting in western and southern areas. A failed invasion of Canada and the occupation of Maine were some of the major conflicts during the war. The war ended in 1815 and most of the Northeast has not seen any major conflict since then.

The American Industrial Revolution was launched in Blackstone Valley in Rhode Island and Massachusetts, where textile mills spread across New England, and in eastern Pennsylvania, where coal, steel, and industrialization launched the nation's manufacturing sector.

After the end of the War of 1812, industry boomed in the Northeast in the early and middle parts of the 19th century. With the construction of railroads and canals crossing the northeast and the rise of western territories and resources from the south, the Northeast experienced the development of new industries and a fast-growing population. Many of the coastal cities, including Boston, New York City, and Philadelphia, served as ocean trade ports for American goods.

Cities, including Allentown, Buffalo, Pittsburgh, Rochester, and Syracuse, were settled and emerged as major industrial centers.

By 1860, New York City, based on its present-day boundaries, was the first U.S. city to reach a population exceeding one million. Due to the settlement of the Midwest and Great Plains, agriculture collapsed in the Mid-Atlantic and New England, with many farms being abandoned by the end of the century, returning to rural forest.

Conflicts with the south over the spread of slavery became a large factor in the start of the American Civil War, between the United States (western and Northeastern states) and the Confederacy (southeastern states). The admission of Maine as a free state in exchange for Missouri becoming a slave state as part of the Missouri Compromise in 1820 settled the final boundaries of the Northeastern states.

The Mason-Dixon line was established as the border of slavery, following the border of Pennsylvania and Delaware/Maryland. Abolitionist movements started in the Northeast and Midwest and became prominent towards the mid-19th century, these groups advocated the shrinking or banning of slavery in the United States. Some Northeastern states still had small amounts of slaves into the 1850s, though some banned it during the decade.

The election of 1860 led to the start of the Civil War; southern states seceded from the United States in late 1860 and early 1861. States like Maryland and Delaware remained in the union, even with slavery still legal. For the first two years, the eastern theater of the war remained in Virginia and Maryland, but in 1863 the war reached its northeastern most extent in Gettysburg, Pennsylvania. The Battle of Gettysburg is considered a turning point in the Civil War, seeing the end of the Confederate push northwards.

While all Northeastern states remained in the United States during the war, conflicts did arise, like the New York draft riots in 1863. The war ended in 1865 with the United States taking back control of Southern states.

=== Industrial Revolution and modern times ===
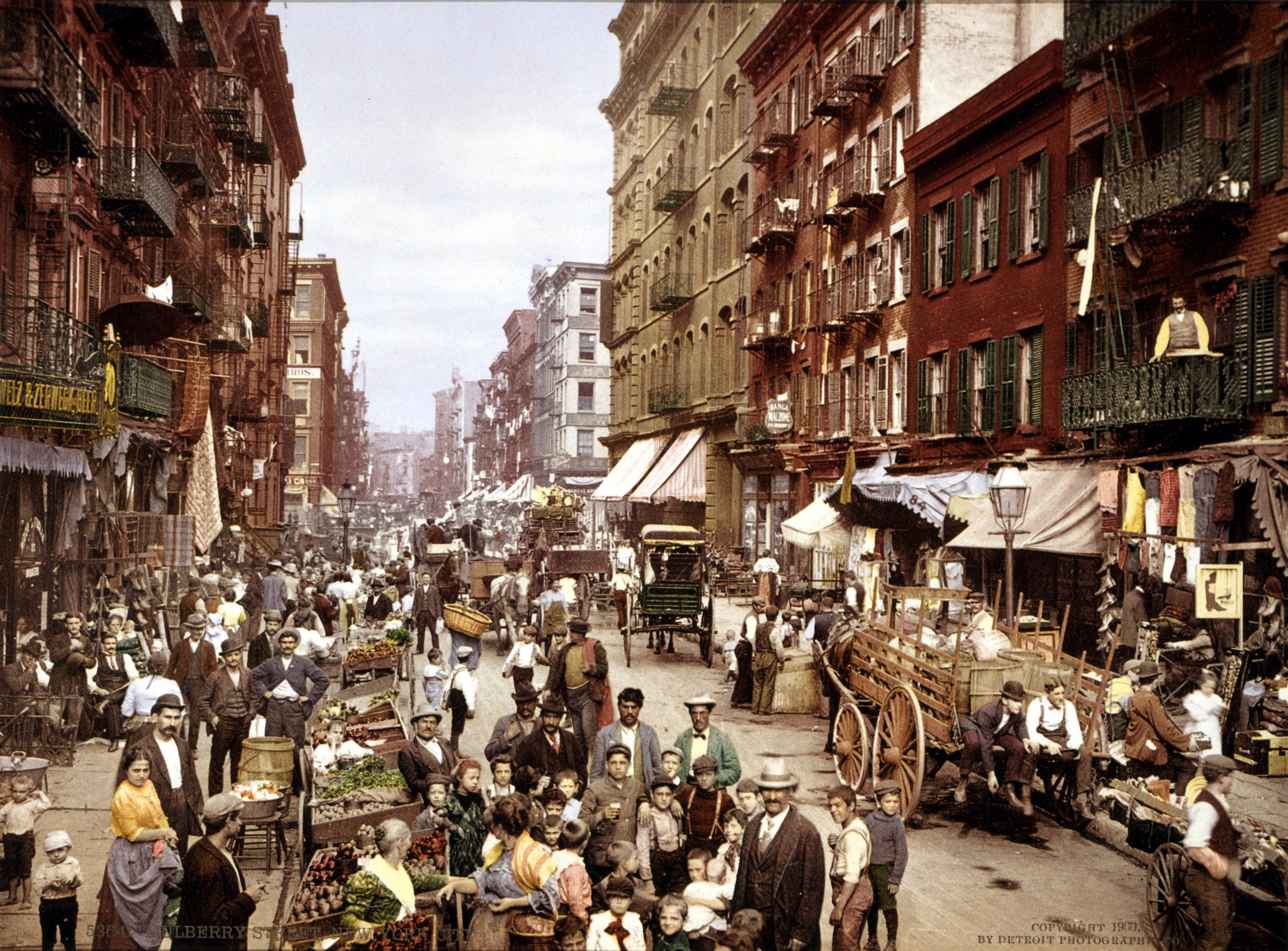
Little Italy in Lower Manhattan, c. 1900

Northeastern United States in 1908 from The Harmsworth atlas and Gazetter

Following the Civil War, the Northeast saw a large economic boom and became one of the most industrialized regions in the world. Many technological innovations were made in the Northeast during this time. The Second Industrial Revolution saw the northeast grow massively, even more so than before the Civil War. Many cities in the Northeast exploded in population, with cities like Philadelphia and New York climbing over one million people, while other cities like Buffalo, Boston, and Pittsburgh rose above half a million during this time.

New York City eventually grew to become one of the largest cities in the world by 1900. With the American involvement in both World Wars, the Northeast became a large base of war production, with the Brooklyn Naval Yard producing many navy ships. Many worker strikes occurred in the states, including the Homestead strike in 1892. Many of these cities saw a peak population and industrial output in the aftermath of World War II in the 1950s.

Starting in the 1950s and continuing into the 21st century, a large industrial decline in the Northeast resulted in a depopulation of many Northeastern cities, many of which had not yet recovered from it into the 21st century. This led to the rise of programs of urban renewal and demolition of large parts of Northeastern cities during the mid and late 20th century. There has also been a large population shift to the Sun Belt states starting in the 1960s.

New York state lost its claim to being the most populated state after it was surpassed by California in the 1970s. Some Northeastern cities, including New York City, have recovered from their decline in the mid-20th century. Many new information and service industries have risen in the northeast, which has led to a boom in the 21st century in some cities in the Northeast like Boston, New York, and Philadelphia. Some other cities like Hartford, Syracuse, and Buffalo still are declining though in the 21st century. Hurricane Sandy impacted much of the northeast in 2012, severely damaging much of the coast and causing flooding inland. The hurricane directly impacted New Jersey and caused large amounts of flooding in New York City.

Although the first settlers of New England were motivated by religion, since the 21st century, New England had become one of the least religious parts of the United States. In a 2009 Gallup survey, less than half of residents in Maine, Massachusetts, New Hampshire, and Vermont reported religion as an important part of their daily life. In a 2010 Gallup survey, less than 30% of residents in Vermont, New Hampshire, Maine, and Massachusetts reported attending church weekly, giving them the lowest church attendance among U.S. states.

== Geography ==
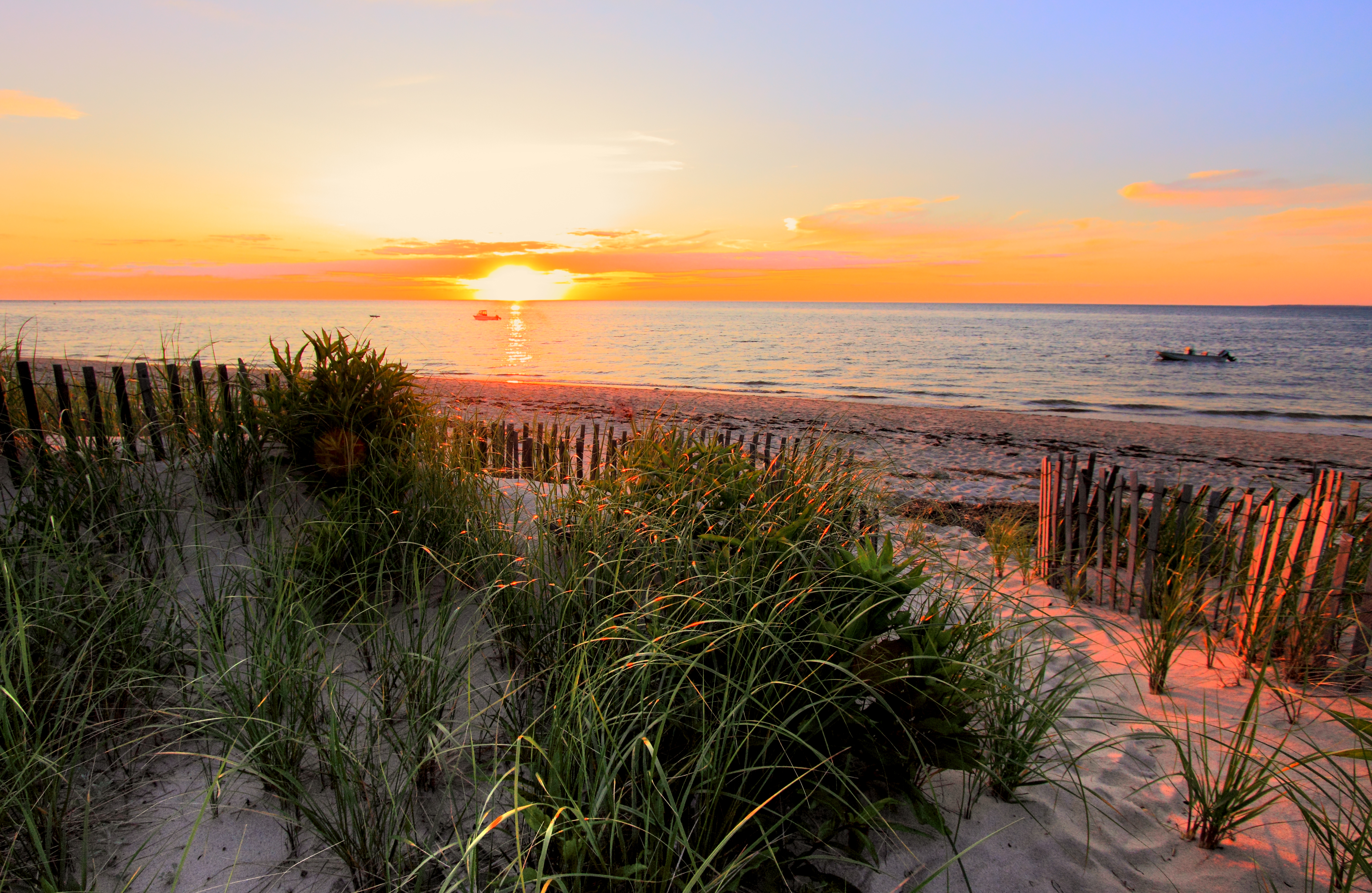
Cape Cod Bay, a leading tourist destination in Massachusetts

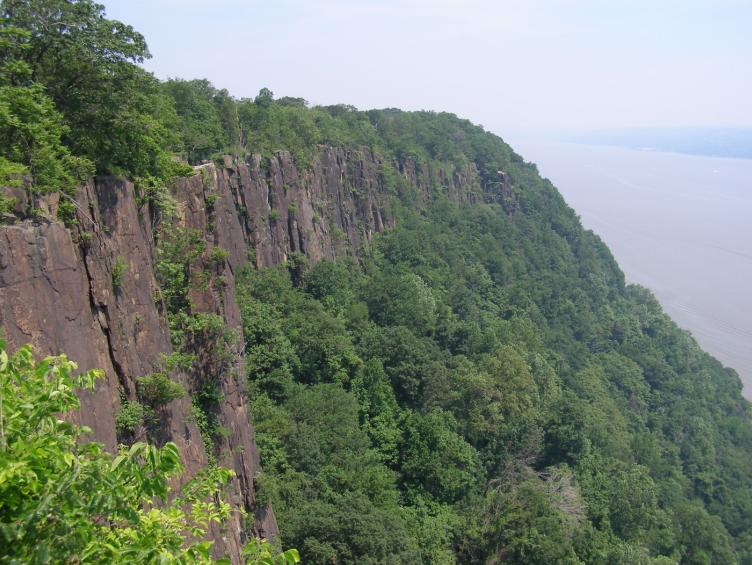
The Palisades along the Hudson River in New Jersey

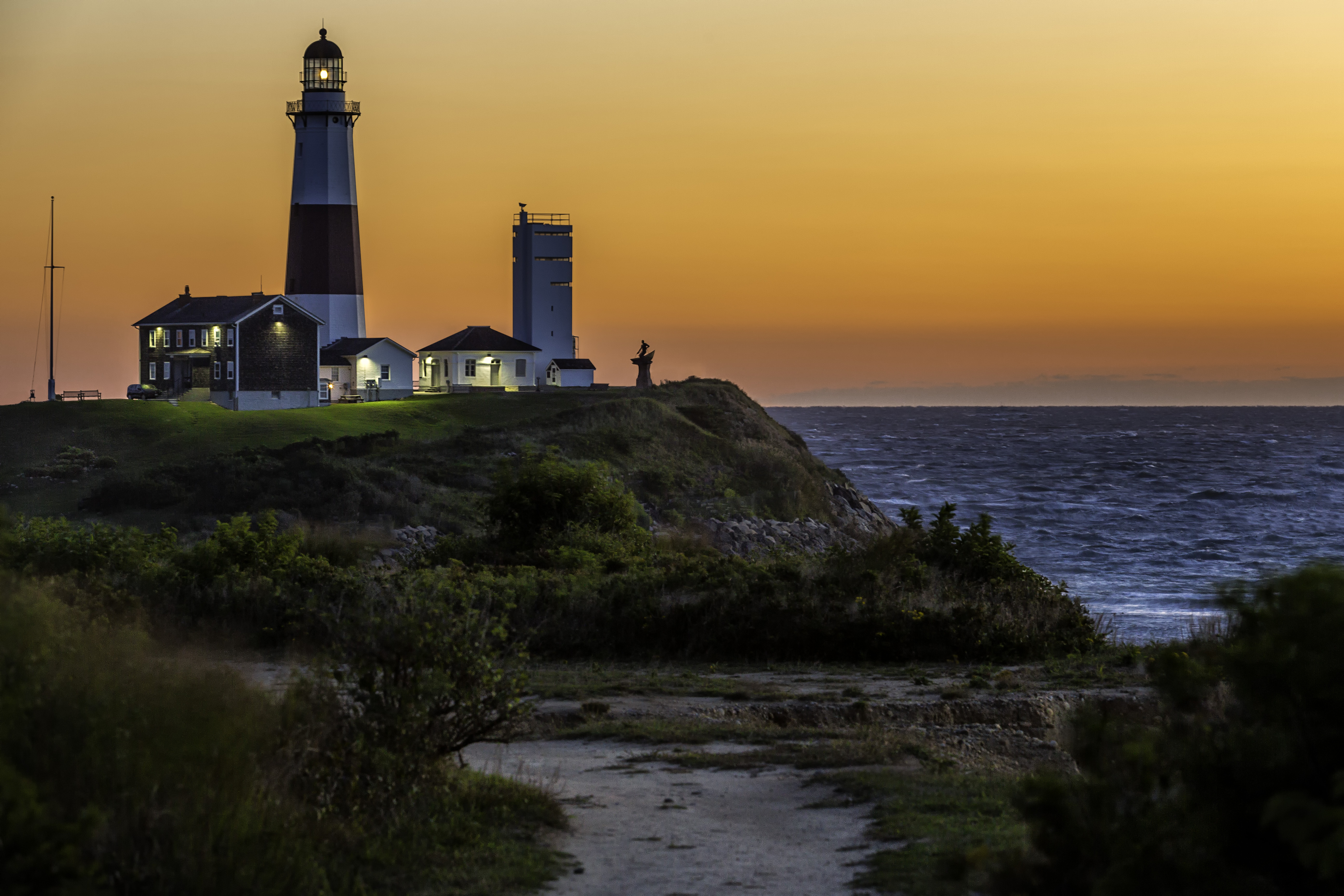
Montauk Point Lighthouse on the east end of Long Island

The vast area from central Virginia to northern Maine, and from western Pennsylvania, from Pittsburgh in the west to the Atlantic Ocean in the east, have all been loosely grouped into the Northeast at one time or another. The U.S. Census Bureau's definition of the Northeast includes nine states: Maine, New York, New Jersey, Vermont, Massachusetts, Rhode Island, Connecticut, New Hampshire, and Pennsylvania. (Note: The U.S. Census Bureau reorganized its administrative units, and its regional offices do not cover the Census regions (the northeasternmost regional office headquartered in New York covers New England, New York, New Jersey, and Puerto Rico).)

The region is often subdivided into New England, the six states east of New York state and the Mid-Atlantic states of New Jersey, New York, Pennsylvania and areas to the south. This definition has been essentially unchanged since 1880 and is widely used as a standard for data tabulation.

The U.S. Census Bureau has acknowledged the obvious limitations of this definition and the potential merits of a proposal created after the 1950 census, that would include changing regional boundaries to include Delaware, Maryland, and Washington, D.C. with the Mid-Atlantic states, but ultimately decided that "the new system did not win enough overall acceptance among data users to warrant adoption as an official new set of general-purpose State groupings. The previous development of many series of statistics, arranged and issued over long periods of time on the basis of the existing State groupings, favored the retention of the summary units of the current regions and divisions." The U.S. Census Bureau confirmed in 1994 that it would continue to "review the components of the regions and divisions to ensure that they continue to represent the most useful combinations of states and state equivalents."

Many organizations and reference works follow the Census Bureau's definition for the region. In the history of the United States, the Mason–Dixon line between Pennsylvania (the North) and Maryland (the South) traditionally divided the regions, but in modern times, various entities define the Northeastern United States in somewhat different ways.

The Association of American Geographers divides the Northeast into two divisions: "New England", which is the same as the Census Bureau; and it has the same "Middle States" but adds Delaware. Similarly, the Geological Society of America defines the Northeast as these same states but with the addition of Maryland and the District of Columbia.

The narrowest definitions include only the states of New England. Other more restrictive definitions include New England and New York as part of the Northeast United States, but exclude Pennsylvania and New Jersey.

States beyond the Census Bureau definition are included in Northeast Region by various other entities:

- Various organizations include Delaware, Maryland, and the national capital of Washington, D.C.
- The U.S. Environmental Protection Agency and National Oceanic and Atmospheric Administration include in their Northeast Region Delaware, Maryland, and West Virginia.
- The United States Fish and Wildlife Service includes in their Northeast Region: Delaware, Maryland, District of Columbia, West Virginia, and Virginia.
- The National Park Service includes in their Northeast Region: Delaware, Maryland, West Virginia, and Virginia, though small parts are also in the National Capital Region.

=== Topography ===
While most of the Northeastern United States lie in the physiographic region of the Appalachian Highlands, some are also part of the Atlantic coastal plain, which extends south to the southern tip of Florida. The coastal plain areas include Cape Cod in Massachusetts, Long Island in New York, and most of New Jersey, and are generally low and flat with sandy soil and long tidal marsh waterways. The highlands, including the Piedmont and the Appalachian Mountains, are heavily forested, ranging from rolling hills to summits greater than 6,000 feet (1,800 m), and pocked with many lakes. The highest peak in the Northeast is Mount Washington in New Hampshire at 6,288 feet (1,917 m).

=== Land use ===
As of 2012, forest-use covered approximately 60% of the Northeastern states, including Delaware, Maryland, and Washington, D.C., about twice the national average. About 11% was cropland and another 4% grassland pasture or range. There is also more urbanized land in the Northeast (12%) than in any other U.S region.

Many parks on a state and national level cover the inland parts of the region. Large parks include the Adirondack Park in northeastern New York, Green Mountain National Forest in Vermont, White Mountain Forest in northern New Hampshire, Baxter State Park in northern Maine, Acadia National Park on the eastern coast of Maine, Allegheny National Forest in northwestern Pennsylvania, and Catskill Park in southern New York. There are also some parks closer to the shore, though these are usually smaller and squeezed in-between urbanized areas. These include the Palisades Park in New Jersey, Fire Island in Long Island, and the Cape Cod shoreline in Massachusetts. The Northeast has 72 National Wildlife Refuges, encompassing more than 500,000 acres (780 sq mi; 2,000 km^{2}) of habitat and designed to protect some of the 92 different threatened and endangered species living in the region.

=== Climate ===
The climate of the Northeastern United States varies from the northernmost state of Maine to its southernmost state in Maryland. The region's climate is influenced by its positional western to eastern flow of weather in the lower middle latitudes in the United States. In summer the subtropical high (Bermuda High) moves toward the East Coast, this pumps warm and sultry air toward the Northeast (less so in the far northern areas of northern New York, Vermont, New Hampshire, and Maine). Summers are normally warm in northern areas to hot in southern areas. Frequent (but brief) thundershowers are common on hot summer days from Connecticut south to Maryland.

In winter, the subtropical high retreats southeastward, and the polar jet stream moves south bringing colder air masses from up in Canada and more frequent storm systems to the region. Winter often brings both rain and snow as well as surges of both warm and cold air. In the southern part of the Northeast from coastal Rhode Island southwest to eastern Maryland, the Appalachians partially protect these locations from the extreme cold coming from the west and the interior of North America.

The basic climate of the Northeast can be divided into a colder and snowier interior, including western Maryland, most of Pennsylvania, most of North Jersey, Upstate New York, and most of New England, and a milder coastal plain region from Cape Cod and southern Rhode Island southward, including Long Island, Southern Connecticut, New York City, central and southern New Jersey, part of the Pennsylvania portion of the Philadelphia metropolitan area including Philadelphia, Delaware, and most of Maryland.

In the latter region the hardiness zone ranges from 7a to 8a. Annual mean temperatures range from the low-to-mid 50s F from Maryland to southern Connecticut, to the 40s F in most of New York State, New England, and northern Pennsylvania.

Most of the Northeast has a humid continental climate (Dfa/Dfb/occasional Dfc/Dc). The northernmost portion of the humid subtropical zone (Cfa/Do) begins at Martha's Vineyard and extreme SW Rhode Island and extends southwestward down the coastal plain to central and southern Maryland. The oceanic climate zone (Cfb/Do) only exists on Block Island and Nantucket. It is the only area of the Northeast where all months average between 0 and 22 °C (32 and 72 °F). Cape Cod borders this zone and warm-summer humid continental (Dfb/Dc).

== Demographics ==
Historical population
Census	Pop.	Note	%±
1790	1,968,040		—
1800	2,632,755		33.8%
1810	3,486,486		32.4%
1820	4,359,653		25.0%
1830	5,542,381		27.1%
1840	6,761,082		22.0%
1850	8,626,851		27.6%
1860	10,594,268		22.8%
1870	12,298,730		16.1%
1880	14,507,407		18.0%
1890	17,406,969		20.0%
1900	21,046,695		20.9%
1910	25,868,573		22.9%
1920	29,662,053		14.7%
1930	34,427,091		16.1%
1940	35,976,777		4.5%
1950	39,477,986		9.7%
1960	44,677,819		13.2%
1970	49,040,703		9.8%
1980	49,135,283		0.2%
1990	50,809,229		3.4%
2000	53,594,378		5.5%
2010	55,317,240		3.2%
2020	57,609,148		4.1%
2022 (est.)	57,040,406		−1.0%

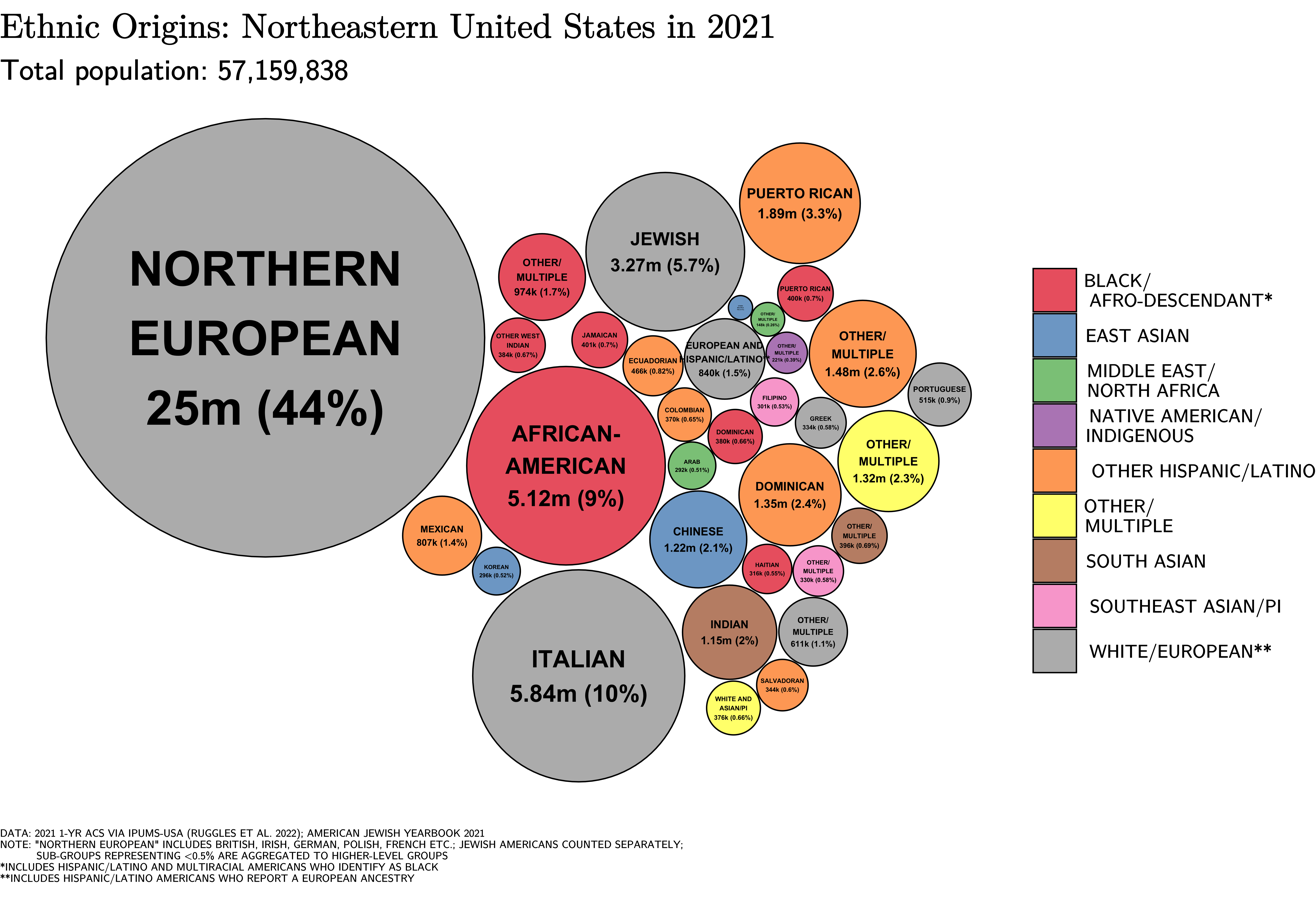
Ethnic origins in the Northeast

As of the 2020 U.S. census, the population of the region was 57,609,148, representing 17.38% of the nation's total population. With an average of 345.5 people per square mile, the Northeast is 2.5 times as densely populated as the second-most dense region, the South. Since the last century, the U.S. population has been shifting away from the Northeast and Midwest toward the South and West.

The region's racial composition as of 2020 was 64.42% white, 11.51% African American, 0.51% Native American, 7.25% Asian, 0.04% Pacific Islander, 8.17% from other races, and 8.10% from two or more races. Hispanic or Latino of any race were 15.27% of the population. There were 22,418,883 households and 14,189,719 families in 2021. Of the 22,418,883 households, 27.7% included children under the age of 18.

In 2021, the region's the population's age distribution was 20.5% under age 18, 57.36% from 18 to 62, and 22.1% who were 62 years of age or older. The median age was 40.5 years. For every 100 females, there were 96.4 males. For every 100 women ages 18 and over, there were 94.3 men.

The median income for a household in the region in 2021 was $77,142, and the median income for a family was $97,347. About 11.9% of the population were below the poverty line, including 16.0% of those under age 18 and 10.4% of those age 65 or over.

The two U.S. Census Bureau divisions in the Northeast, New England and the Mid-Atlantic, rank second and first respectively among the 9 divisions in population density according to the 2013 population estimate. The South Atlantic region (233.1) was very close behind New England (233.2). Due to the faster growth of the South Atlantic region, it will take over the #2 division rank in population density in the next estimate, dropping New England to 3rd position. New England is projected to retain the number 3 rank for many, many years, as the only other lower-ranked division with even half the population density of New England is the East North Central division (192.1) and this region's population is projected to grow slowly. (Note: Based on U.S. Census Bureau population projections to 2030 (and assuming constant land area) the population density for the South Atlantic division will increase significantly to 294.6/mi^{2}, New England's density will increase to 249.2/mi^{2} and the East North Central division will increase only slightly to 200.2/mi^{2}. The division with the 5th highest density is projected to be the East South Central division at 111.6/mi^{2}.)

State	2020 census	2010 census	Change	Total Area	Density
Connecticut	3,605,944	3,574,097	+0.89%	4,842.35 sq mi (12,541.6 km^{2})	741/sq mi (286/km^{2})
Maine	1,362,359	1,328,361	+2.56%	30,842.90 sq mi (79,882.7 km^{2})	43/sq mi (17/km^{2})
Massachusetts	7,029,917	6,547,629	+7.37%	7,800.05 sq mi (20,202.0 km^{2})	879/sq mi (340/km^{2})
New Hampshire	1,377,529	1,316,470	+4.64%	8,952.64 sq mi (23,187.2 km^{2})	150/sq mi (58/km^{2})
Rhode Island	1,097,379	1,052,567	+4.26%	1,033.81 sq mi (2,677.6 km^{2})	1,025/sq mi (396/km^{2})
Vermont	643,077	625,741	+2.77%	9,216.65 sq mi (23,871.0 km^{2})	68/sq mi (26/km^{2})
New England	15,116,205	14,444,865	+4.65%	62,688.4 sq mi (162,362 km^{2})	236/sq mi (91/km^{2})
New Jersey	9,288,994	8,791,894	+5.65%	7,354.21 sq mi (19,047.3 km^{2})	1,225/sq mi (473/km^{2})
New York	20,201,249	19,378,102	+4.25%	47,126.36 sq mi (122,056.7 km^{2})	421/sq mi (163/km^{2})
Pennsylvania	13,002,700	12,702,379	+2.36%	44,742.67 sq mi (115,883.0 km^{2})	286/sq mi (111/km^{2})
Middle Atlantic	42,492,943	40,872,375	+3.96%	99,223.24 sq mi (256,987.0 km^{2})	420/sq mi (162/km^{2})
Total	57,609,148	55,317,240	+4.14%	161,911.64 sq mi (419,349.2 km^{2})	354/sq mi (137/km^{2})

=== Vital statistics ===
Year	Population	Live births	Deaths	Natural change	Crude birth rate (per 1,000)	Crude death rate (per 1,000)	Natural change (per 1,000)	Crude migration change (per 1,000)
2000	53,666,295	692,507	487,831	204,676	12.9	9.1	3.8	
2001	53,915,522	684,535	487,718	196,817	12.7	9.0	3.7	1.0
2002	54,143,915	678,944	487,268	191,676	12.5	9.0	3.5	0.7
2003	54,334,453	687,759	482,660	205,099	12.7	8.9	3.8	-0.3
2004	54,423,533	678,414	472,835	205,579	12.5	8.7	3.8	-2.1
2005	54,451,230	671,617	475,398	196,219	12.3	8.7	3.6	-3.1
2006	54,522,659	681,122	464,503	216,619	12.5	8.5	4.0	-2.7
2007	54,653,362	687,031	461,712	225,319	12.6	8.4	4.2	-1.7
2008	54,875,926	675,466	466,256	209,210	12.3	8.5	3.8	0.2
2009	55,133,101	663,186	457,548	205,638	12.0	8.3	3.7	0.9
2010	55,422,736	648,435	459,708	188,727	11.7	8.3	3.4	1.8
2011	55,818,637	643,413	470,043	173,370	11.5	8.4	3.1	4.0
2012	56,161,789	638,723	467,444	171,279	11.4	8.3	3.1	3.1
2013	56,460,251	630,305	475,519	154,786	11.2	8.4	2.8	2.5
2014	56,737,161	634,492	475,173	159,319	11.2	8.4	2.8	2.1
2015	56,936,961	630,622	489,383	141,239	11.1	8.6	2.5	1.0
2016	57,116,757	625,197	490,086	135,111	10.9	8.6	2.3	0.8
2017	57,304,709	615,362	499,319	116,043	10.7	8.7	2.0	1.3
2018	57,474,216	607,212	501,631	105,581	10.6	8.7	1.9	1.1
2019	57,560,957	597,883	499,764	98,119	10.4	8.7	1.7	-0.2
2020	57,436,027	576,437	608,684	-32,247	10.0	10.6	-0.6	-1.6
2021	57,234,503	590,147	567,817	22,330	10.3	9.9	0.4	-3.9
2022	57,174,375	584,590	550,118	34,472	10.2	9.6	0.6	-1.7
2023	57,458,539	571,649	517,363	54,286	9.9	9.0	0.9	4.0
2024	57,940,522	575,346	510,412	64,934	9.9	8.8	1.1	7.2
2025	58,042,054							

Largest cities in the Northeast

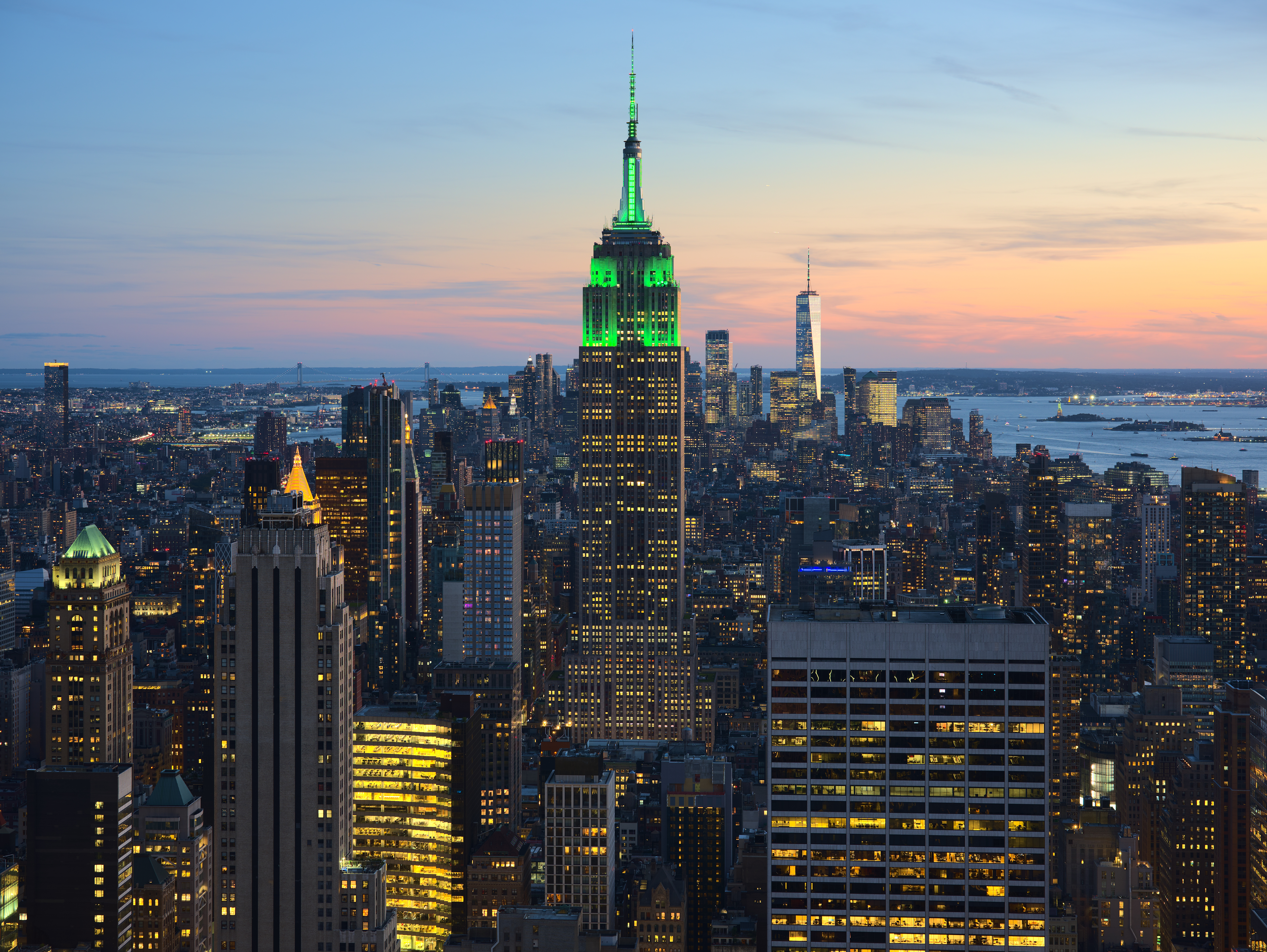
New York City, New York is the most populated city in both the Northeast and the United States. Its population was 8,804,190 in 2020. Its metro area has a population of 20,140,470.

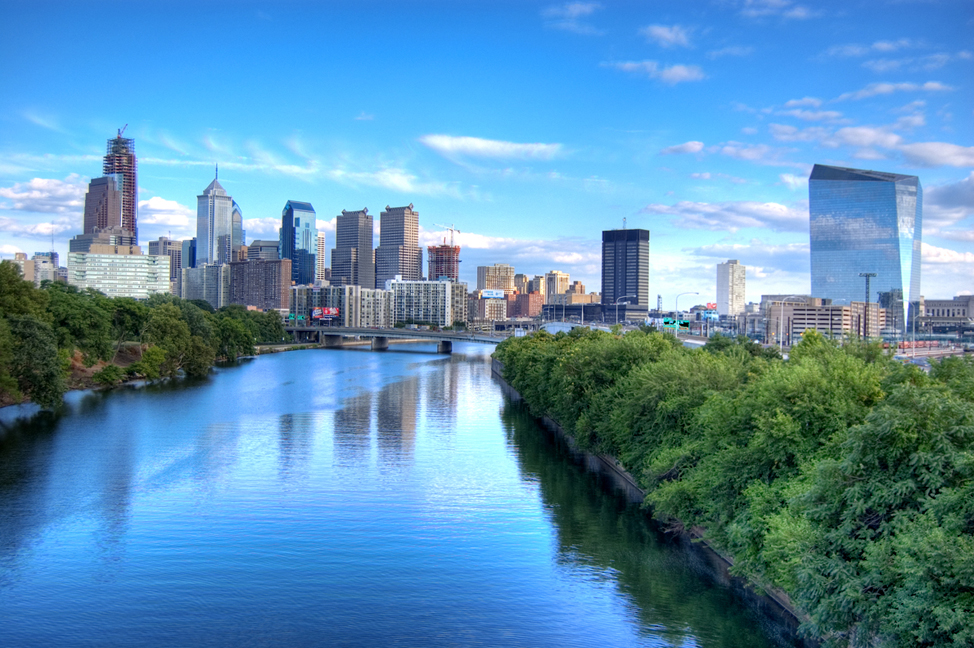
Philadelphia, Pennsylvania is the second-most populated in the Northeast and sixth-most populous in the nation. Its population was 1,603,797 in 2020. Its metro area population was 6,228,601.

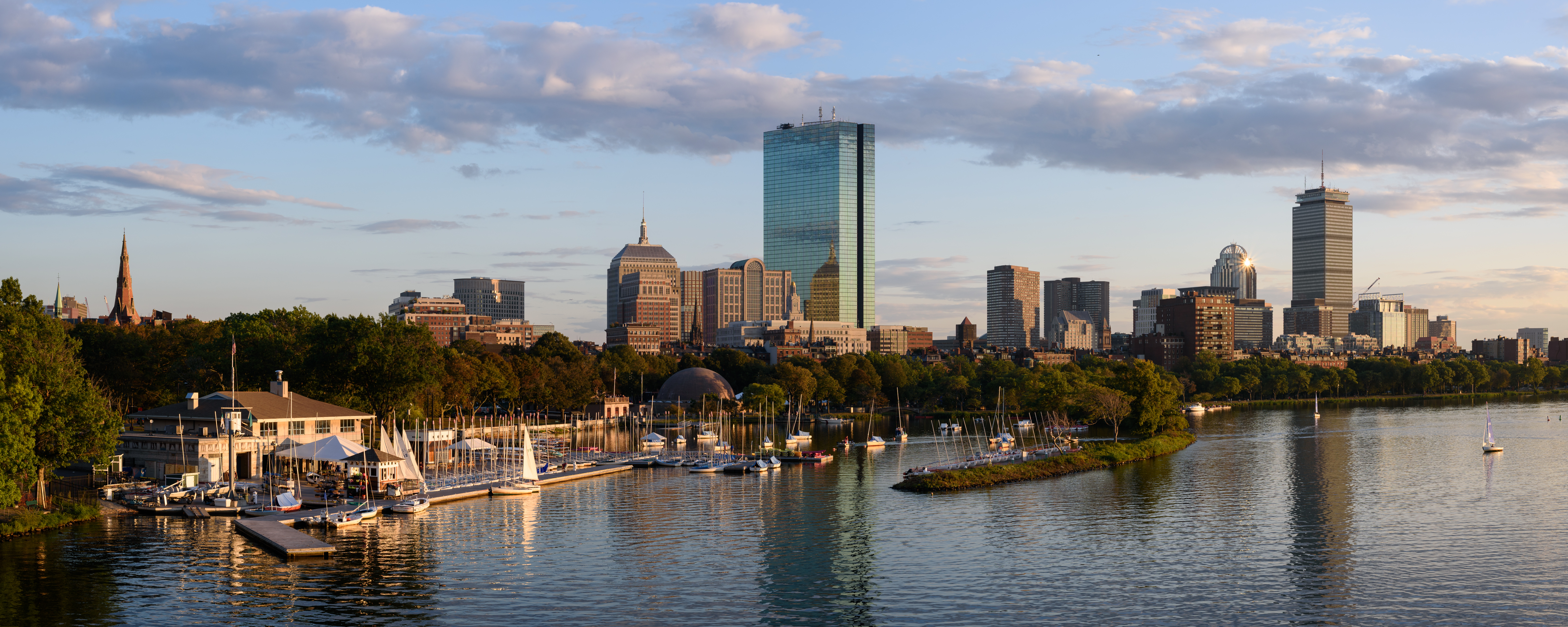
Boston, Massachusetts is the third-most populous city in the Northeast and 25th-most populous in the nation. Its population was 675,647 in 2020. Its metro area had a population of 4,941,632.

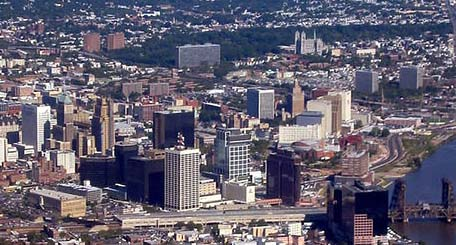
Newark, New Jersey is the fourth-most populous city in the Northeast and 64th-most populous in the U.S. Its population was 311,549 in 2020. Its metro area is combined with the New York area.

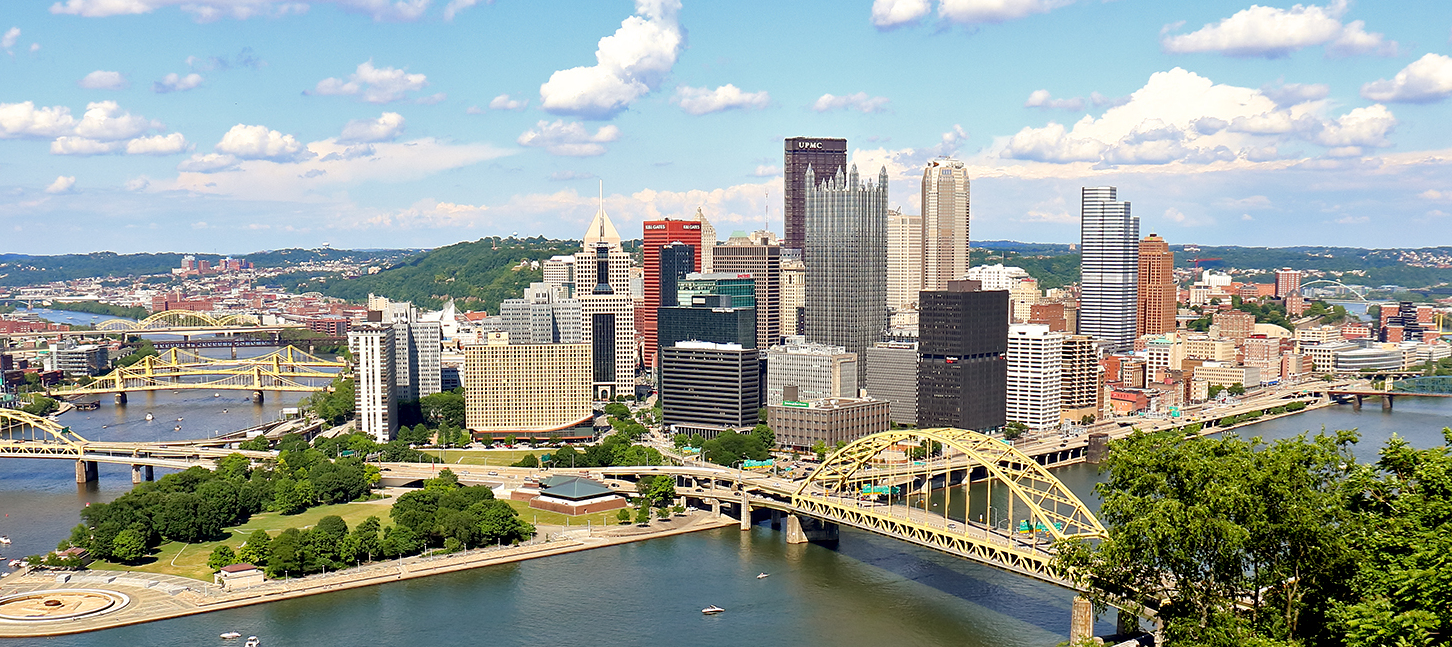
Pittsburgh, Pennsylvania is the fifth most populous city in the Northeast and 68th-most populous in the nation. Pittsburgh is at the western frontier of the Northeast. Its population was 302,971 in 2020. Its metro area has a population of 2,370,930.

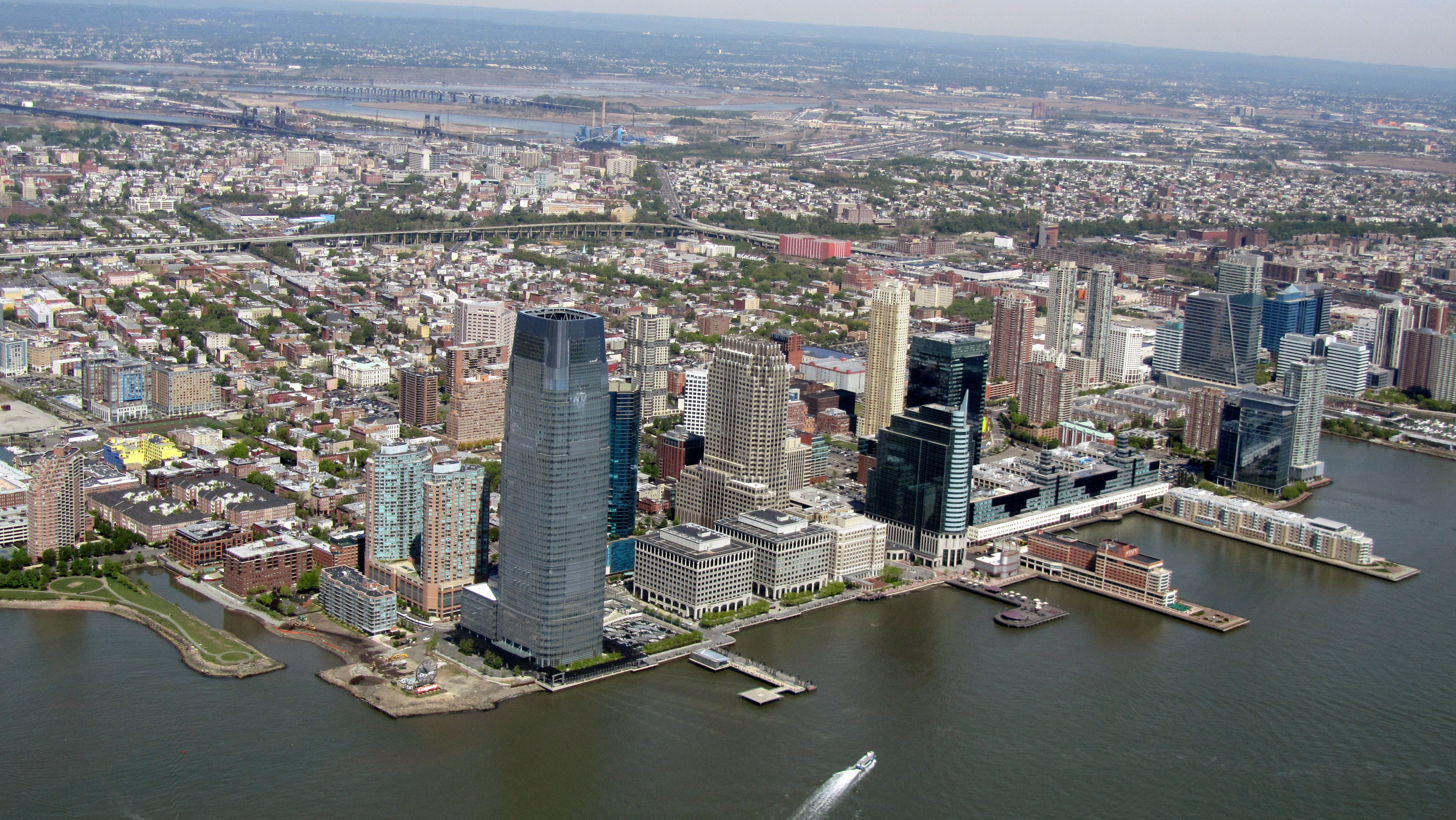
Jersey City, New Jersey is the sixth most populous-largest city in the Northeast and 70th-most populous in the nation. It had a population of 292,449 in 2020. It sits directly across the Hudson River from New York City.

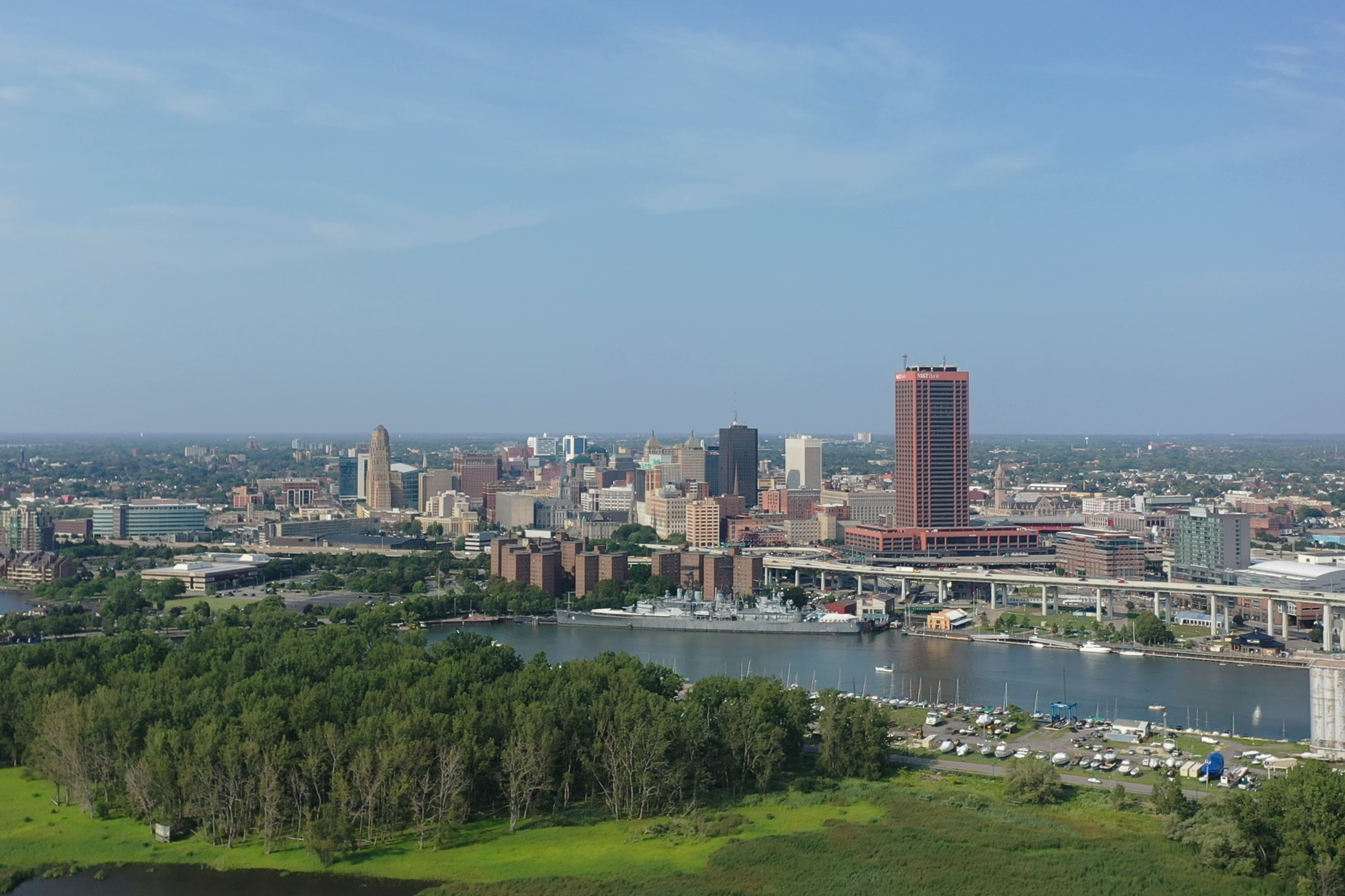
Buffalo, New York is the seventh most populous city in the Northeast and 82nd-most populous in the U.S. Its population was 278,349 in 2020. Its metro area had a population of 1,166,902.

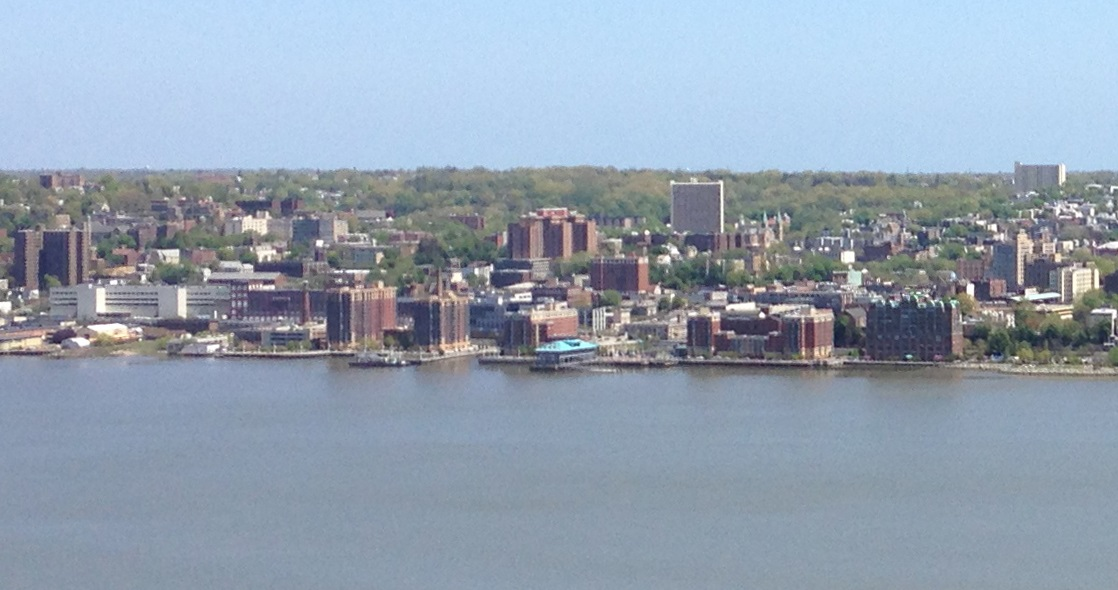
Yonkers, New York is the eighth most populous city in the Northeast and 115th-most populous city in the U.S. It had a population of 211,569 in 2020. It borders the Bronx, a borough of New York City to its south.

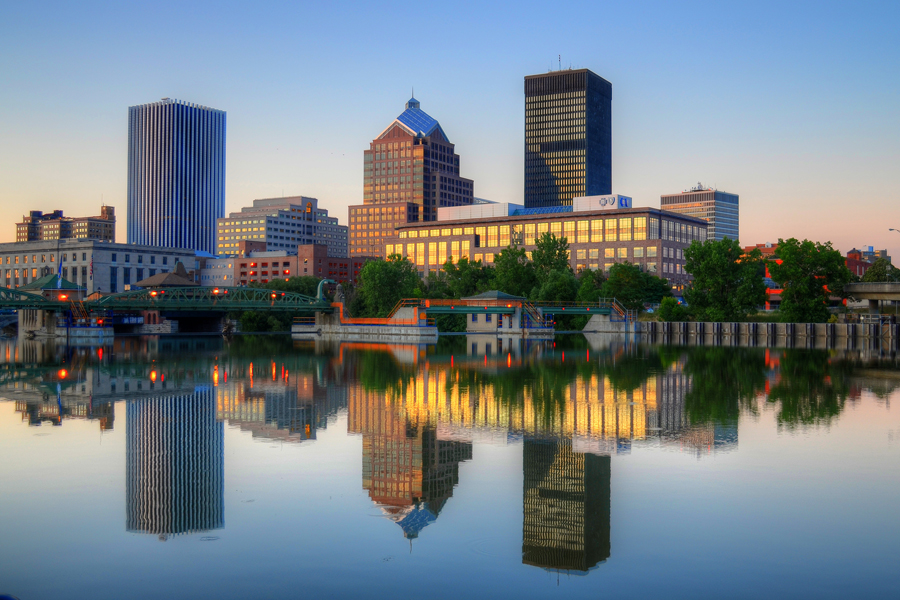
Rochester, New York is the ninth most populous city in the Northeast and the 116th-most populous city in the United States. It had a population of 211,328 in 2020. The Rochester metro has a population of 1,090,135.

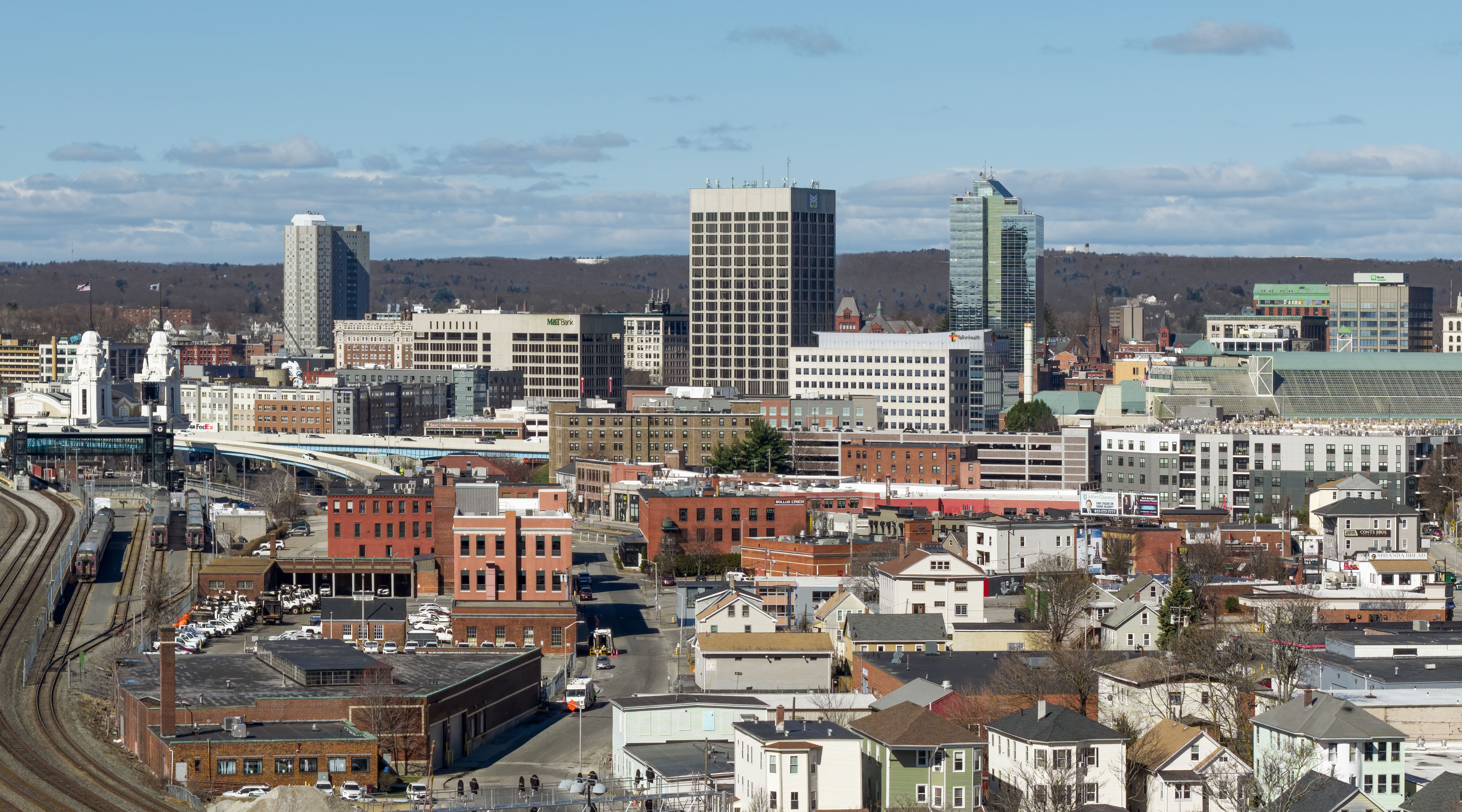
Worcester, Massachusetts is the tenth most populous city in the Northeast and the 114th-most populous city in the United States. It had a population of 206,518 in the 2020 census. It is an edge city of Greater Boston and its metro is combined with it.

== Economy ==
As of 2012, the Northeast U.S. accounts for approximately 23% of the nation's gross domestic product. Due to its vast population and diverse landscapes, the Northeast has a large and robust economy, ranging from financial services in Manhattan, to agriculture in Central Pennsylvania.

=== New York City ===
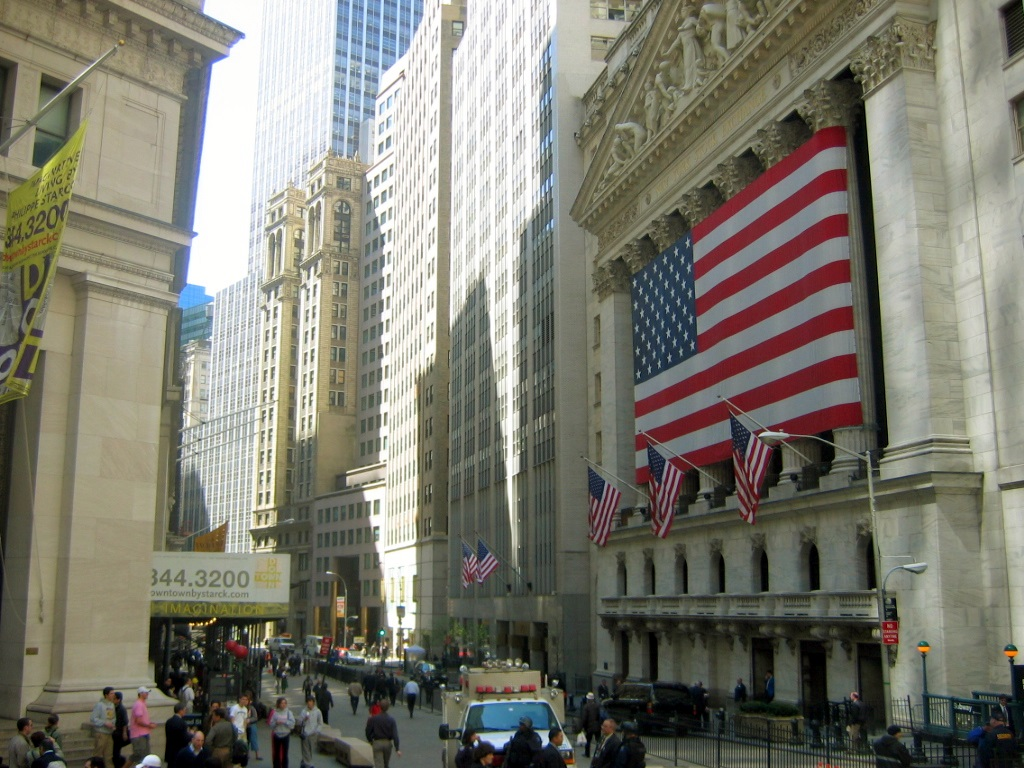
The New York Stock Exchange in Lower Manhattan is the largest stock exchange in the world by market capitalization.

As of 2021, the New York metropolitan area is estimated to produce a gross metropolitan product (GMP) of $2.1 trillion US dollars, ranking it first in the U.S. If the New York metropolitan area were a sovereign state, it would have been the eighth-largest economy in the world. Manhattan is considered the world's financial center, with many large banks based in Manhattan and some of the largest stock exchanges on Wall Street, like the New York Stock Exchange, it is so prominent that the term "Wall Street" is usually synonymous with finance. Many other companies are based in New York City area, either in Midtown Manhattan, downtown Brooklyn, Long Island City, or the various suburbs, like Stamford or White Plains. Some of the largest companies based in New York City area include, Verizon, J.P. Morgan Chase, Citigroup, MetLife, PepsiCo, IBM, Time Warner, Goldman Sachs, and Pfizer. Several technology companies have been founded in New York, or moved their headquarters to New York from other places.

New York City is the nation's most populated city, and the New York metropolitan area including and surrounding it is the nation's most populated metropolitan region, contributing to a sizable shopping economy, including many large shopping malls and department stores based in the area, such as Macy's on 34th Street, Fifth Avenue, and American Dream in East Rutherford, New Jersey, the Palisades Center in West Nyack, New York, and the SoNo Collection in Norwalk, Connecticut. The Port of New York and New Jersey, one of the nation's largest ports, is located on New York Harbor.

=== Philadelphia ===
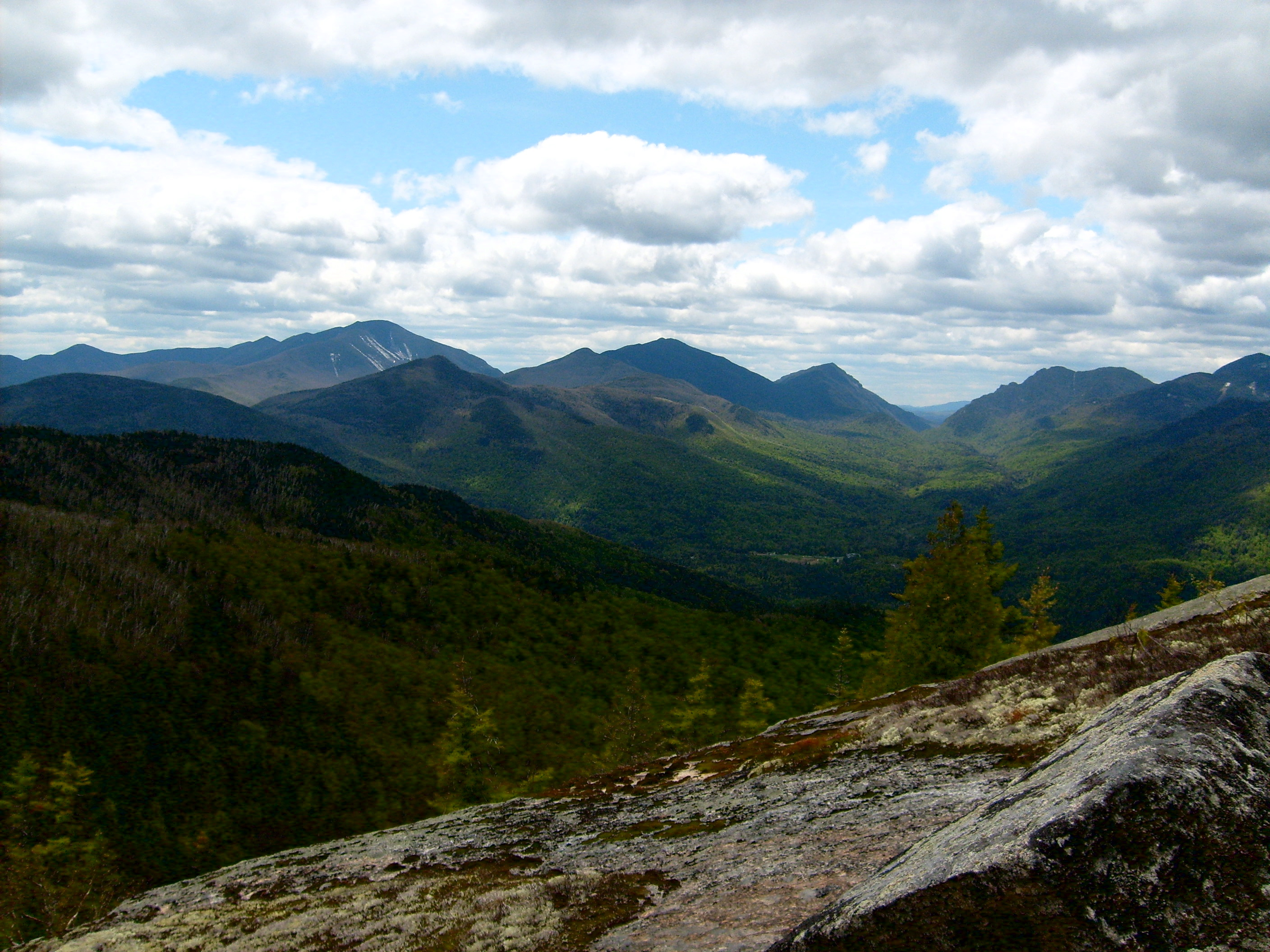
Adirondack Park

As of 2021, the Philadelphia metropolitan area is estimated to produce a GMP of $479 billion US dollars, making it the 9th largest economy in the United States. Many large companies are based in Philadelphia, the nation's sixth-largest city, including AmerisourceBergen, Comcast, and DuPont. The Philadelphia Mint is also located in the city.

=== Boston ===
The Boston metropolitan area is a major center for insurance, finance, and technology, serving as the global headquarters for General Electric, Liberty Mutual, and other large companies.

=== Other regions ===
Rural regions and states, including most of Upstate New York, Vermont, New Hampshire, and Maine, rely more on agriculture, logging, mining, and tourism to help boost their local and statewide economies. Many national and state parks in the region generate lots of tourism, especially during fall months. The logging industry is especially prominent in Maine, making up a large part of Northern Maine's economy.

Many Northeastern states have very large economies and are highly developed. As of 2022, the per capita gross domestic products for these states are:

1. New York, US$2.1 trillion, per capita $105,226
2. Pennsylvania, US$931 billion, per capita $71,825
3. New Jersey, US$753 billion, per capita $81,307
4. Massachusetts, US$693 billion, per capita $99,274
5. Connecticut, US$323 billion, per capita $89,301
6. New Hampshire, US$106 billion, per capita $76,008
7. Maine, US$85 billion, per capita $61,491
8. Rhode Island, US$72 billion per capita $65,879
9. Vermont, US$41 billion, per capita $63,275

The Nuclear Regulatory Commission oversees 34 nuclear reactors, eight for research or testing and 26 for power production in the Northeastern United States.

== Transportation ==
=== Rail systems ===
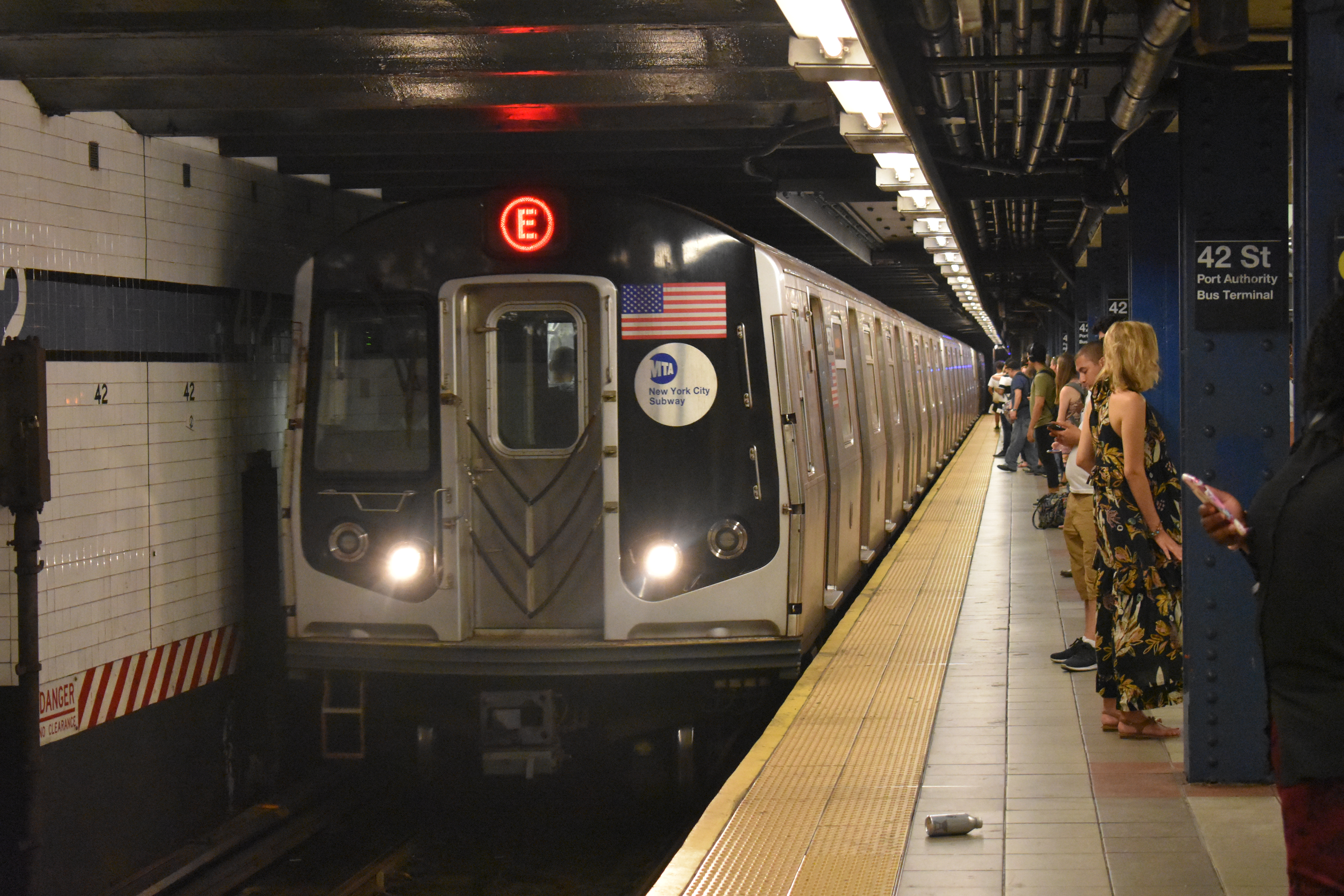
The New York City Subway, one of the busiest transit systems in the world, used by over two billion passengers annually

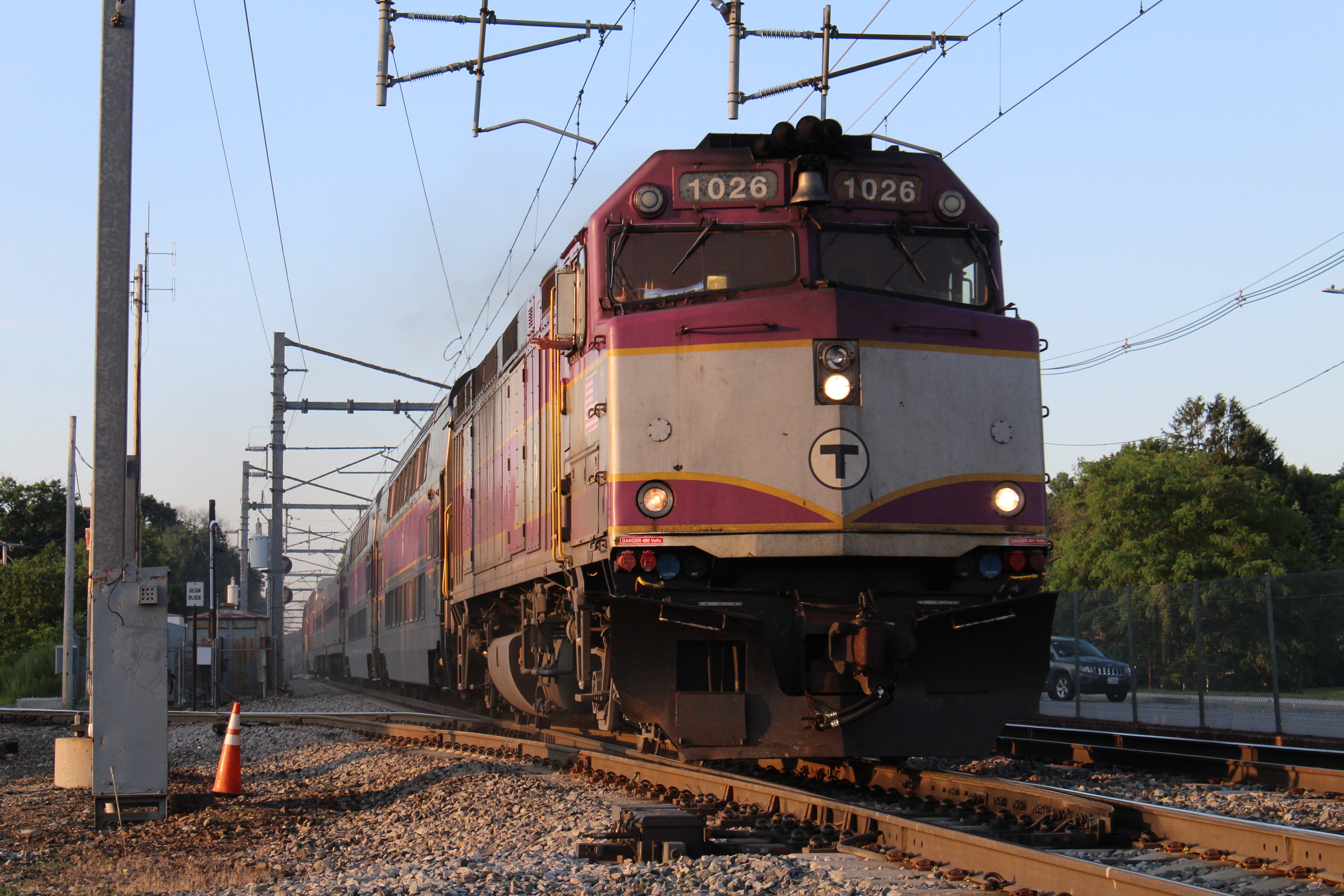
A MBTA Commuter Train, one of the Northeast's busiest commuter rail systems, entering Mansfield station in Mansfield, Massachusetts

The Northeast is served by Amtrak trains, with the Northeast Regional and Acela, two of the busiest intercity rail lines running from Washington D.C. in the south to Boston in the north. Other Amtrak Lines that serve the Northeast include the Downeaster, Empire Service, Vermonter, Lake Shore Limited, Pennsylvanian. Light rail, commuter rail, and other subway systems are also available in the region.

No.	Name	Metro	Rail type	City	No. of lines	Annual Ridership (Q4 2019)
1	New York City Subway	New York	Rapid Transit	New York	36	2,723,960,100
2	MBTA subway	Boston	Rapid Transit/ Light Rail	Boston	12	199,501,352
3	Long Island Rail Road	New York	Commuter Rail	New York/Long Island	13	117,773,400
4	PATH	New York	Rapid Transit	Newark/Jersey City/New York	4	90,276,600
5	SEPTA subway	Philadelphia	Rapid Transit	Philadelphia	3	90,240,800
6	NJ Transit Commuter Rail	New York/Philadelphia	Commuter Rail	Hoboken/Paterson/Atlantic City	11	88,319,600
7	Metro North Railroad	New York	Commuter Rail	NYC/New Haven/White Plains/Stamford	3-4	86,459,000
8	SEPTA Regional Rail	Philadelphia	Commuter Rail	Philadelphia	13	35,594,800
9	MBTA Commuter Rail	Boston	Commuter Rail	Boston, Providence, Worcester	14	32,420,400
10	Pittsburgh Light Rail	Pittsburgh	Light Rail	Pittsburgh, Bethel Park	3	27,975,600
11	SEPTA Trolley	Philadelphia	Light Rail	Philadelphia	8	24,321,200
12	NJ Transit Tram	New York/Philadelphia	Light Rail	Trenton/Camden/Newark/Jersey City	3	23,700,000
13	Buffalo Metro Rail	Buffalo	Light Rail	Buffalo	1	1,890,200
14	Hartford Line	Hartford	Commuter Rail	New Haven, Hartford, Springfield	1	750,000
15	Shore Line East	New Haven	Commuter Rail	New Haven, New London, Stamford	1	660,500

==== Major stations ====
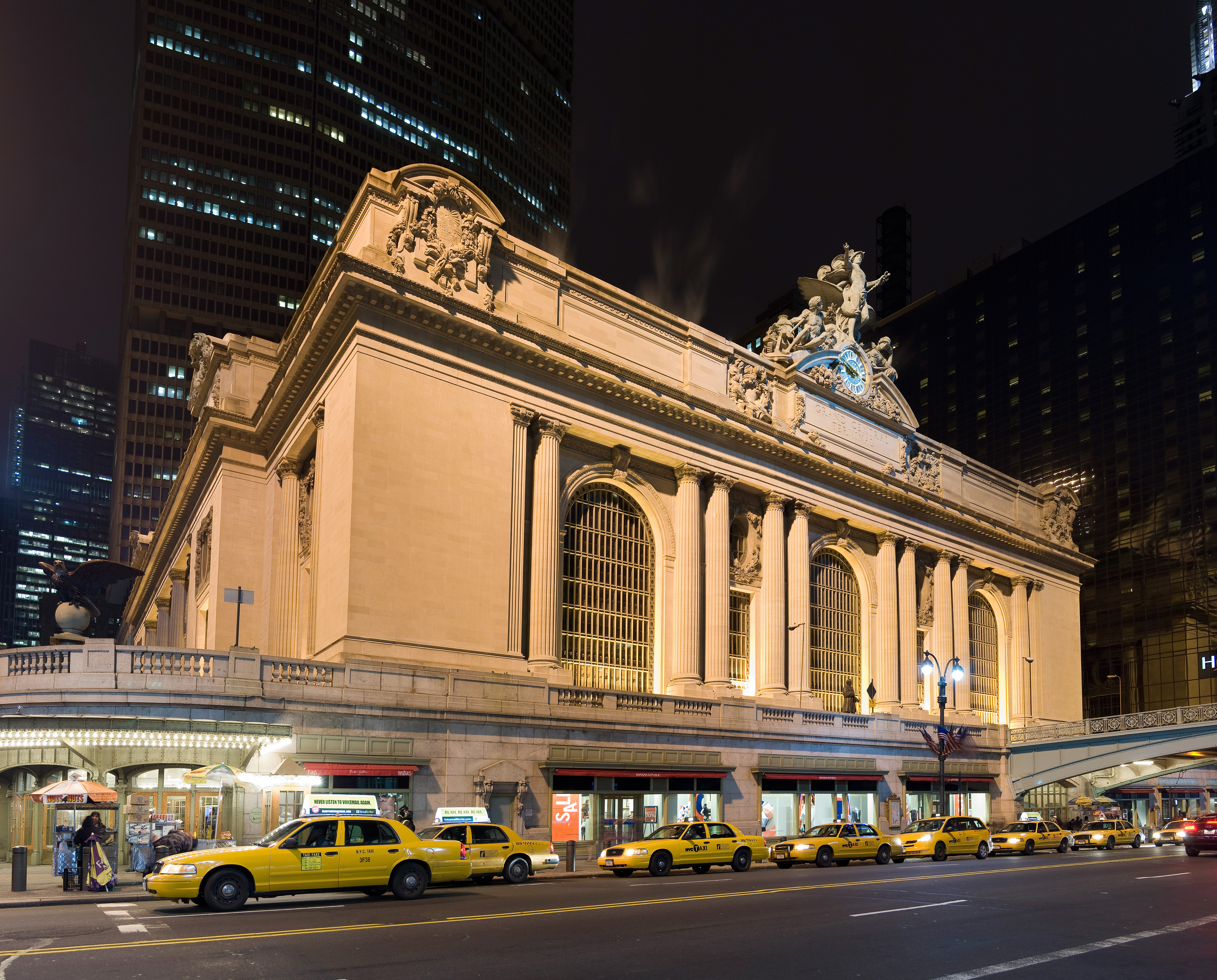
Grand Central Terminal in New York City, a National Historic Landmark and the second-busiest train station in the nation after New York Penn Station, also in New York City

- 30th Street Station in Philadelphia. Served by all SEPTA Regional Lines, Amtrak, NJ Transit's Atlantic City Line, it is the third-busiest Amtrak station and 11th-busiest train station in North America with over four million passengers in 2019.
- Pennsylvania Station in New York City is served by some NJ Transit lines, and some Long Island Rail Road and Amtrak trains. It is the busiest train station in North America, with over 10 million passengers in 2019, along with 27 million passengers from NJ Transit and 69 million from Long Island Rail in 2017.
- Grand Central Terminal in New York City is served by Metro North and some Long Island Rail trains (beginning in January 2023). Grand Central Terminal had over 67 million annual passengers in 2017 and is the second-busiest train station in the nation and third-busiest in North America.
- Union Station in New Haven, Connecticut is served by New Haven Line, Hartford Line, and Shoreline East along existing Amtrak train lines. It had 350,000 annual Amtrak passengers in 2017.
- South Station in Boston is served by southern MBTA commuter lines and Amtrak, and was the seventh-busiest train station in North America with nearly 29 million passengers as of 2017.
- North Station in Boston is served by northern MBTA commuter lines and the Downeaster on Amtrak. It had six million MBTA users in 2012 and 152,000 Amtrak passengers in 2021.

=== Airports ===
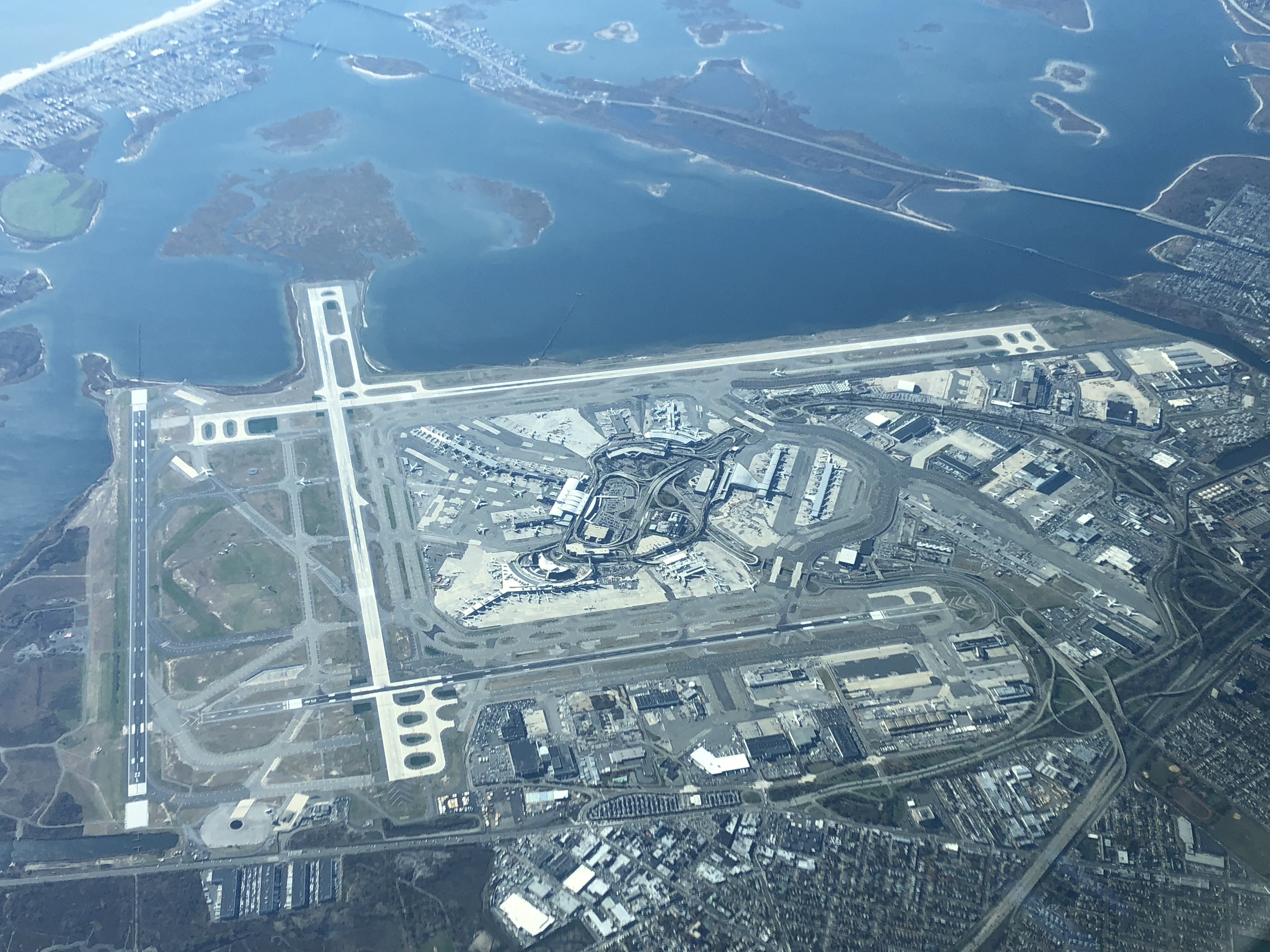
JFK International Airport in Queens, New York. The busiest airport in the Northeast and the 13th busiest in the nation.

The following table includes all airports categorized by the FAA as large or medium hubs located in the Northeastern states.

National Rank	Metro area served	Airport code	Airport name	Largest airline	Annual Passengers
13	New York	JFK	John F. Kennedy International Airport	JetBlue (39%)	15,273,342
14	New York	EWR	Newark Liberty International Airport	United (53%)	14,514,049
19	Boston	BOS	Logan International Airport	JetBlue (30%)	10,909,817
21	Philadelphia	PHL	Philadelphia International Airport	American (44%)	9,820,222
22	Baltimore	BWI	Baltimore/Washington International Airport	Southwest (70%)	9,253,561
25	New York	LGA	LaGuardia Airport	Delta (21%)	7,827,307
48	Pittsburgh	PIT	Pittsburgh International Airport	Southwest (26%)	3,069,259
54	Hartford	BDL	Bradley International Airport	American (17%)	2,273,259

=== Road ===
Many major highways cross the Northeast, connecting it to the rest of the nation.

Number	Length (mi)	Length (km)	Southern or western terminus	Northern or eastern terminus	Formed	Removed	Notes
I-70	2171.71	3,495.03	I-15 in Cove Fort, Utah	I-695 at Woodlawn, Baltimore County, Maryland	1956	current	Serves one Northeastern state: Pennsylvania; Associated routes: I-270, I-370
I-76	435.66	701.13	I-71 in Westfield Center, Ohio	I-295 at Bellmawr, New Jersey	1964	current	Serves two Northeastern states: Pennsylvania, New Jersey; Associated routes: I-176, I-276, I-376, I-476, I-676
I-78	146.28	235.41	I-81 at Jonestown, Pennsylvania	Canal Street in New York City	1957	current	Serves three Northeastern states: Pennsylvania, New Jersey, New York; Associated routes: I-278, I-478, I-678, I-878
I-79	343.46	552.75	I-77 in Charleston, West Virginia	PA 5 in Erie, Pennsylvania	1967	current	Serves one Northeastern state: Pennsylvania; Associated routes: I-279, I-579
I-80	2899.59	4,666.44	US 101 in San Francisco, California	I-95 in Teaneck, New Jersey	1956	current	Serves two Northeastern states: Pennsylvania and New Jersey; Associated routes: I-180, I-380, I-280
I-81	855.02	1,376.02	I-40 in Dandridge, Tennessee	Canadian border at Wellesley Island, New York	1961	current	Serves two Northeastern states: Pennsylvania, New York; Associated routes:I-481 and I-781
I-83	85.03	136.84	President Street and Fayette Street in Baltimore, Maryland	I-81 in Harrisburg, Pennsylvania	1959	current	Serves one Northeastern state: Pennsylvania; Associated route: I-283
I-84	232.71	374.51	I-81 in Scranton, Pennsylvania	I-90 in Sturbridge, Massachusetts	1963	current	Serves four Northeastern states: Pennsylvania, New York, Connecticut, Massachusetts; Associated routes: I-384, I-684
I-86	223.39	359.51	I-90 near North East, Pennsylvania	NY 17/NY 79 in Windsor, New York	1999	current	Unfinished in New York; Serves two Northeastern states: Pennsylvania, New York; Associated routes: none
I-87	333.49	536.70	I-278 in New York City	A-15 at Canadian border in Champlain, New York	1957	current	New York only Associated routes: I-287, I-587, I-787
I-88	117.75	189.50	I-81 in Binghamton, New York	I-90 in Schenectady, New York	1968	current	New York only Associated routes: none
I-89	191.12	307.58	I-93/SR 3A in Bow, New Hampshire	Route 133/Future A-35 at Canadian border in Highgate, Vermont	1960	current	Serves two Northeastern states: New Hampshire, Vermont; Associated route: I-189
I-90	3020.44	4,860.93	SR 519/4th Avenue/Edgar Martinez Drive in Seattle, Washington	MA 1A in Boston, Massachusetts	1956	current	Serves three Northeastern states: Pennsylvania, New York, Massachusetts; Associated routes: I-190 (New York), I-290 (New York), I-390, I-490, I-590, I-690, I-790, I-890, I-990, I-190 (Massachusetts), I-290 (Massachusetts); Longest Interstate highway in the US
I-91	290.37	467.31	I-95 in New Haven, Connecticut	A-55 at Canadian border in Derby Line, Vermont	1958	current	Serves three Northeastern states: Connecticut, Massachusetts, Vermont; Associated routes: I-291 (Connecticut), I-291 (Massachusetts) I-391, I-691
I-93	189.95	305.69	I-95/US 1 in Canton, Massachusetts	I-91 in St. Johnsbury, Vermont	1957	current	Serves three Northeastern states: Massachusetts, New Hampshire, Vermont; Associated routes: I-293, I-393
I-95	1919.31	3,088.83	US 1 in Miami, Florida	NB 95 at Canadian border in Houlton, Maine	1957	current	Serves eight Northeastern states: Pennsylvania, New Jersey, New York, Connecticut, Rhode Island, Massachusetts, New Hampshire, Maine; Associated routes: I-195, I-295, I-395, I-495, I-695, I-895; Longest primary north-south Interstate highway
I-99	98.34	158.26	I-70/I-76 in Bedford, Pennsylvania	I-86/NY 17 in Painted Post, New York	1998	current	Unfinished in Pennsylvania; Serves two Northeastern states: Pennsylvania, New York; Associated routes: none

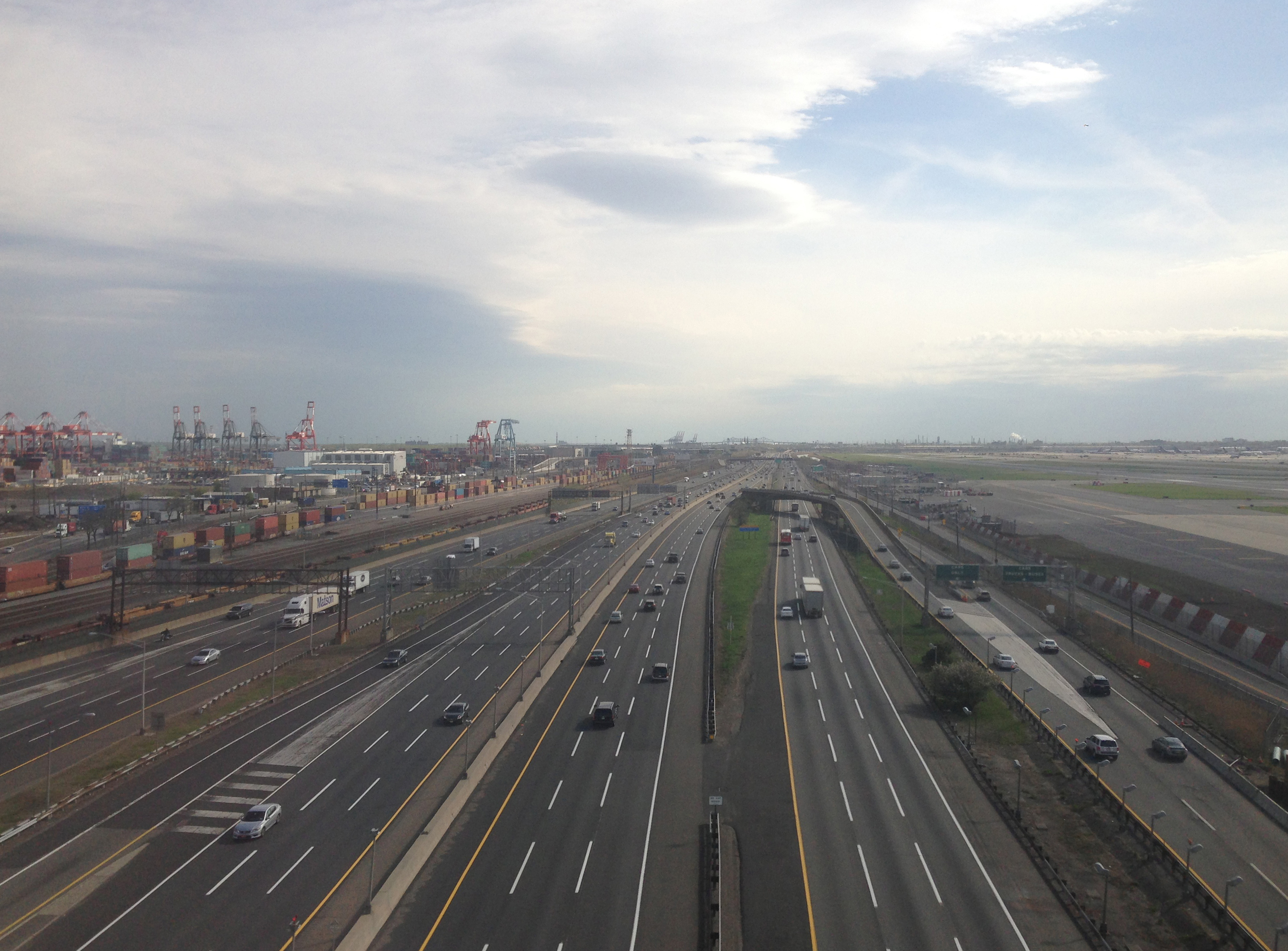
The New Jersey Turnpike (I-95) is one of the busiest highways in the nation.

Many other minor highways exist in the Northeast, connecting cities. Major US Routes which run through the Northeast include US 1, US 2, US 3, US 4, US 5, US 6, US 7, US 9, US 11, US 13, US 15, US 19, US 20, US 22, US 29, US 30, US 40, US 44, US 46, US 50, US 62, US 113, US 130, US 201, US 202, US 206, US 209, US 219, US 220, US 222, US 224, US 301, US 302, US 322, US 340, US 422, US 522.

The Northeast has the highest amount of tolled roads/bridges in the nation with only two states in the Northeast having no tolls, Connecticut and Vermont. Notable turnpikes include the Pennsylvania Turnpike (I-76/I-276/I-95), New Jersey Turnpike (partially I-95), New York Thruway (I-87/I-90), Massachusetts Turnpike (I-90), Maine Turnpike (I-95), PA Turnpike Northeast Extension (I-476). The northeast also contains many tolled and non-tolled parkways, many of which are in New York City metro. Major parkways include the Garden State Parkway, Taconic State Parkway, Hutchinson River Parkway, Saw Mill River Parkway, Lake Ontario State Parkway, Niagara Scenic Parkway, Belt Parkway, Grand Central Parkway, Northern State Parkway.

==== Major crossings ====
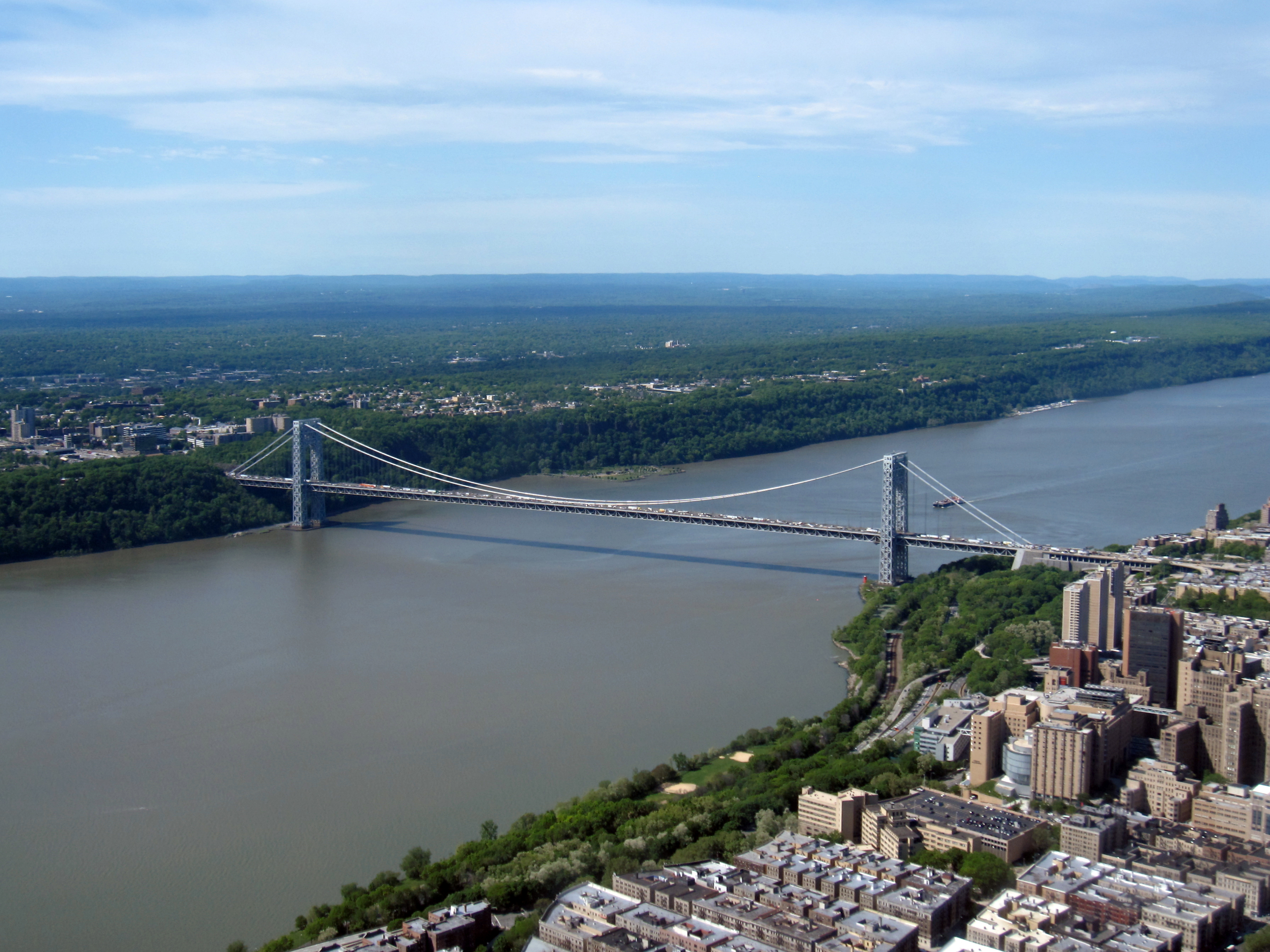
The George Washington Bridge crossing the Hudson River, carrying most traffic on Interstate 95 from New Jersey to New York.

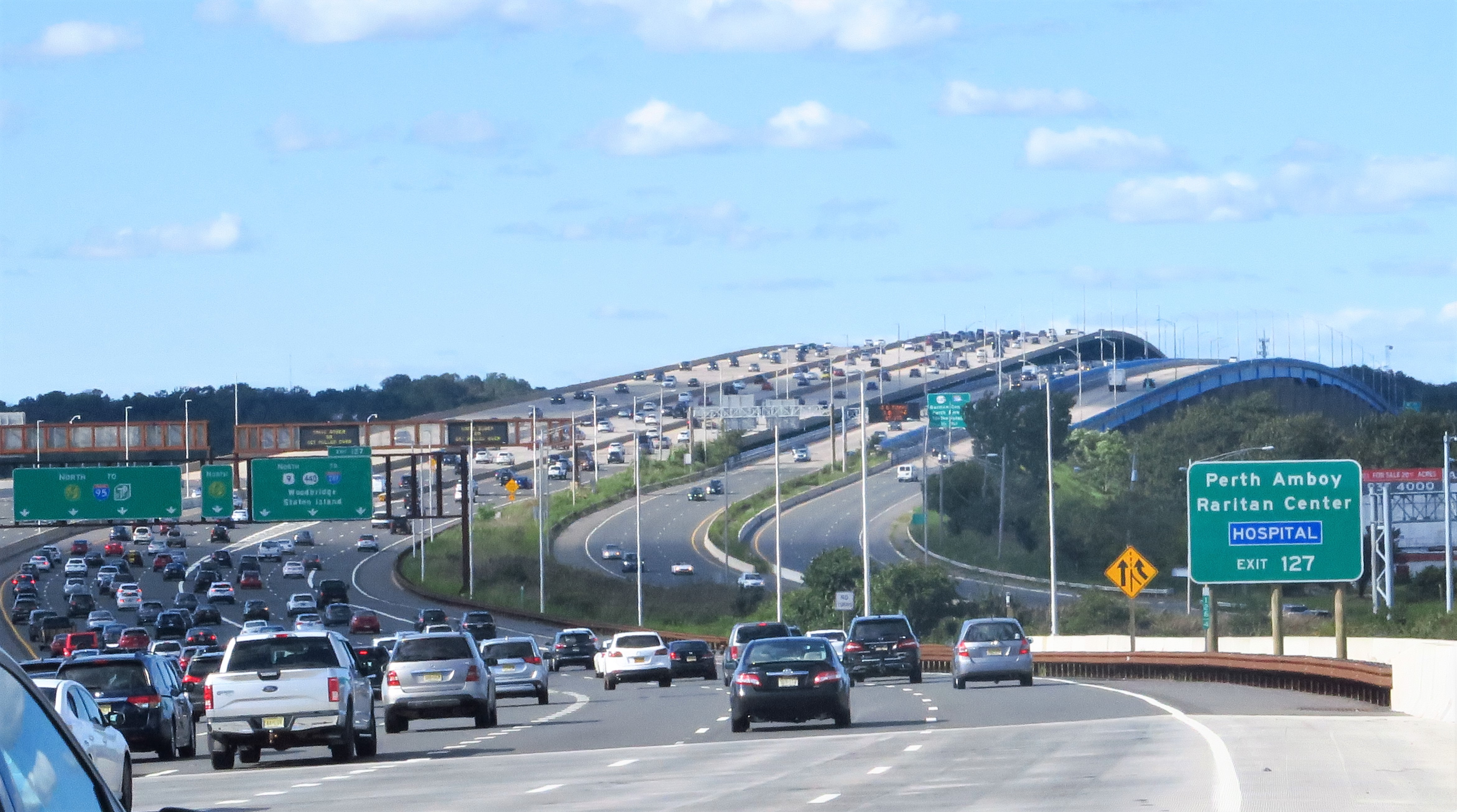
The Driscoll Bridge is one of the world's widest and busiest motor vehicle bridges, crossing the Raritan River on New Jersey's Garden State Parkway.

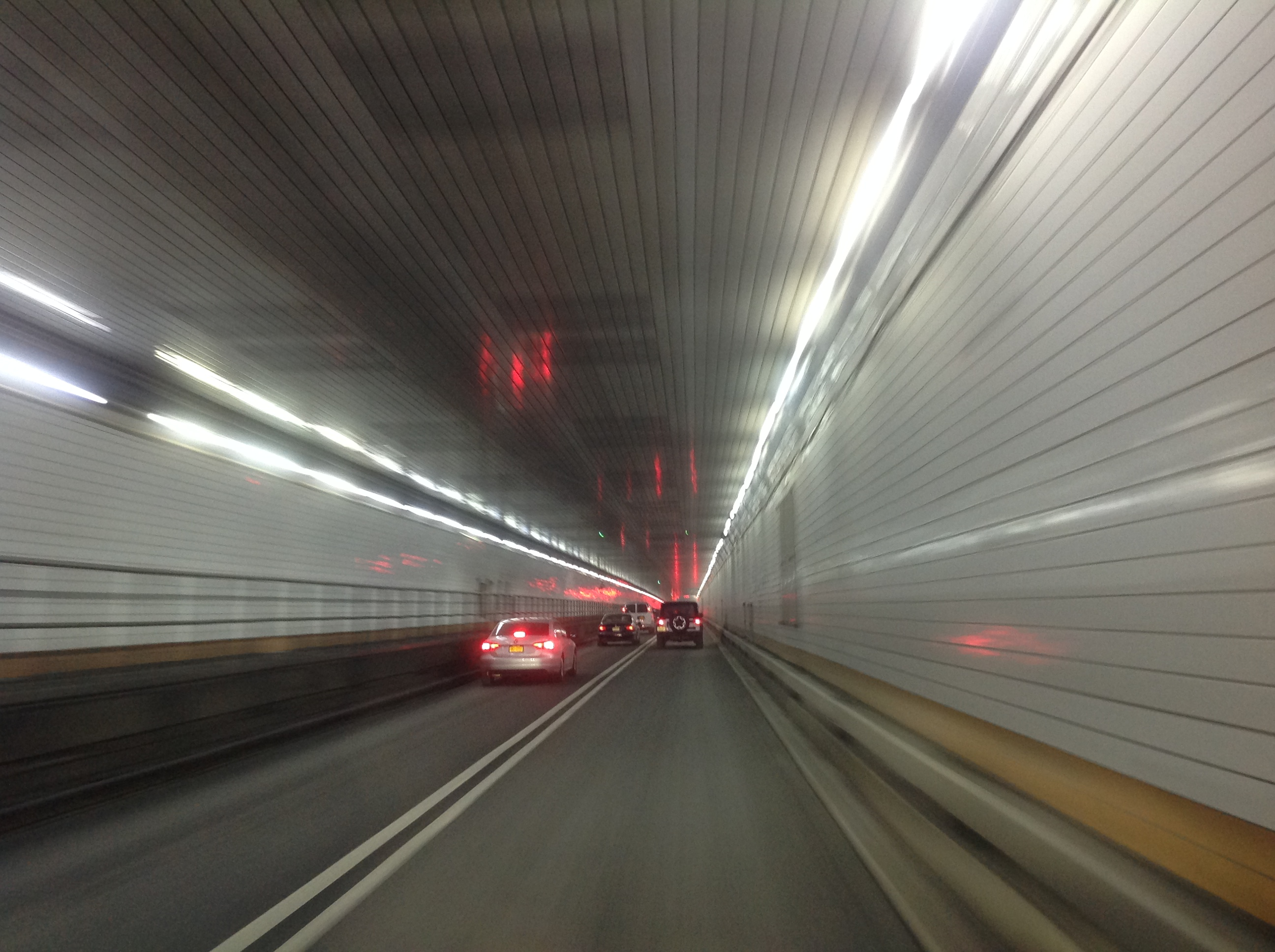
The Holland Tunnel crossing under the Hudson River, connecting Jersey City with Lower Manhattan.

- Delaware Memorial Bridge (I-295, NJ Turnpike) - Crosses the Delaware River between Delaware and New Jersey, the southern most fixed crossing on the river. Eastbound span opened in 1951, westbound span opened in 1968.
- Walt Whitman Bridge (I-76) - Crosses the Delaware River, connecting southern Philadelphia to southern New Jersey suburbs. Opened in 1957.
- Benjamín Franklin Bridge (I-676) - Connects downtown Philadelphia with Camden, New Jersey and southern New Jersey. Opened in 1926.
- Delaware River Turnpike Toll Bridge (I-95, PA Turnpike) - Connects the PA Turnpike to the NJ Turnpike. I-95 was only designated in 2018, formerly was I-276. Opened in 1956.
- Driscoll Bridge (Garden State Parkway) - Crosses the Raritan River near its mouth at Raritan Bay. Opened in 1954, the bridge is located within the heart of the state of New Jersey, providing access to the Jersey Shore to the south and North Jersey to the north.
- Newark Bay Bridge (I-76, NJ Turnpike) - Crosses Newark Bay, connecting Newark to Jersey City and Bayonne. Opened in 1956.
- Bayonne Bridge (NJ 440/NY 440) - Crosses Arthur Kill, connecting Bayonne to Staten Island, New York. Opened in 1931, raised in 2017.
- Verrazzano–Narrows Bridge (I-278) - Crosses New York Harbor to connect Staten Island to Brooklyn, double decked. Opened in 1964.
- Brooklyn-Battery Tunnel (I-478) - Crosses underneath the East River to connect Lower Manhattan to Brooklyn. Opened in 1950.
- Brooklyn Bridge, Manhattan Bridge, Williamsburg Bridge - The bridges cross the East River to connect Lower Manhattan to Brooklyn. Opened in 1883, 1909, and 1903.
- PATH Hudson Tubes - Carries the PATH metro trains underneath the Hudson River to connect Newark, Jersey City, and Hoboken to Lower and Midtown Manhattan. The tubes opened up in 1908/1909.
- Holland Tunnel (I-78) - Crosses underneath the Hudson River, connects road traffic from Jersey City and Newark to Lower Manhattan. Opened in 1927.
- Queens-Midtown Tunnel (I-495) - Crosses underneath the East River, connecting the Long Island Expressway to Manhattan. Opened in 1940.
- North River Tunnels (NJ Transit, Amtrak) Carries the Northeast Corridor underneath the Hudson River, connecting rail traffic from New Jersey to Pennsylvania Station and New England. Opened in 1910.
- Lincoln Tunnel (NJ 495) - Crosses underneath the Hudson River to connect New Jersey to Midtown Manhattan. Opened in 1937.
- Queensboro Bridge (NY 25) - Connects Midtown Manhattan to Long Island City. Opened in 1909.
- Triborough Bridge (I-278) - Crosses the East River and Harlem River, provides road connections to Upper Manhattan, Queens, and the Bronx. Also crosses and connects Randalls Island. Opened in 1936.
- Hell Gate Bridge (Amtrak) - Crosses the East River and Bronx Kill, provides a rail connection from Pennsylvania Station to the Bronx and Connecticut. Opened in 1917.
- George Washington Bridge (I-95) - Crosses the Hudson River, connecting New York and New England to New Jersey and cross-country I-80. One of the busiest crossings in the United States. Double Decked. Opened in 1931.
- Alexander Hamilton Bridge (I-95) - Crosses the Harlem River, connecting Manhattan and the GW Bridge to the Cross Bronx Expressway. Opened in 1963.
- Whitestone Bridge (I-678) - Crosses the East River, connecting South Bronx to Queens. Opened in 1939.
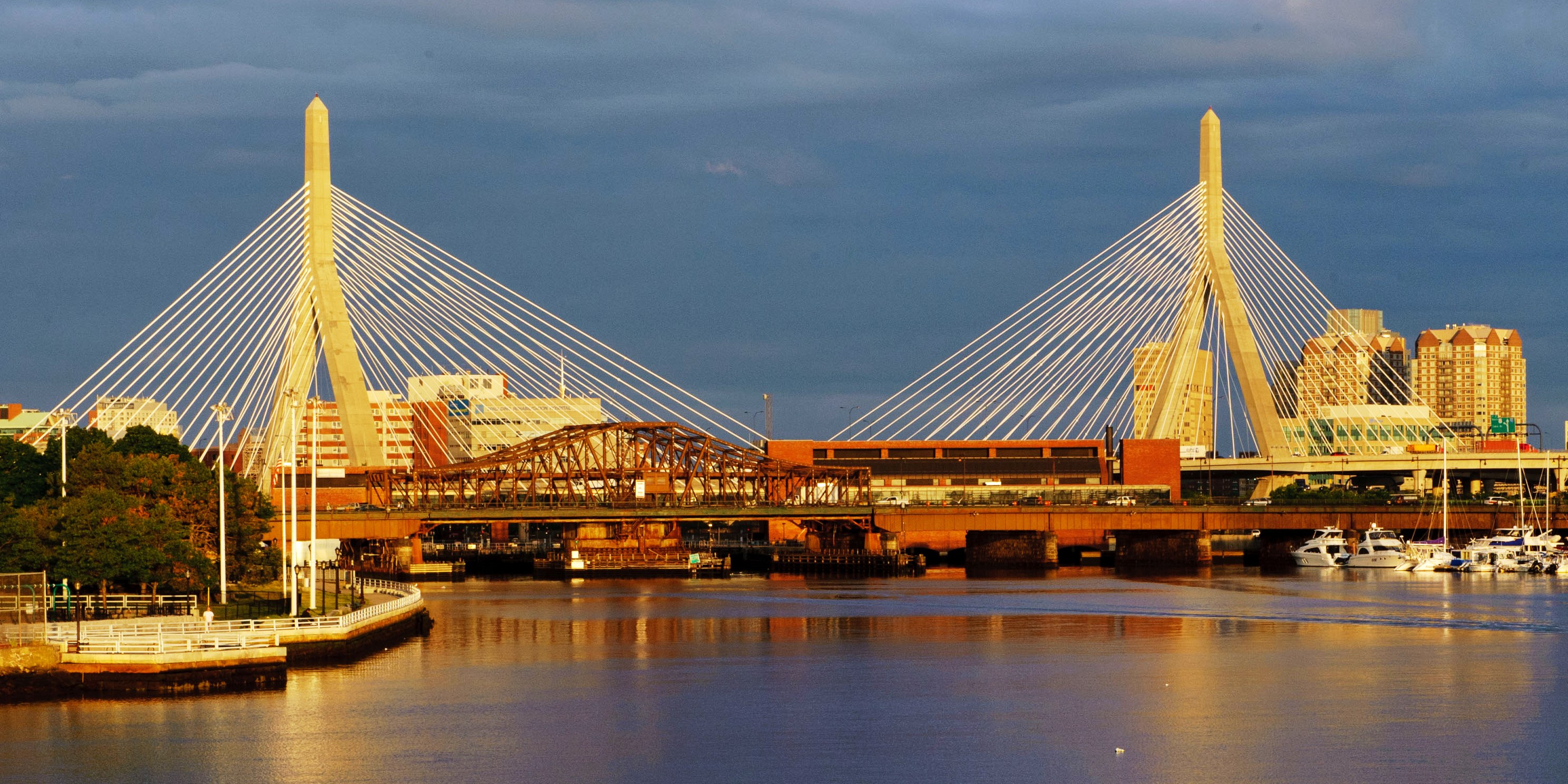
  The Zakim Bridge carrying traffic on Intestate 93 from Boston across the Charles River.
- Throgs Neck Bridge (I-295) Crosses the East River, connecting the Bronx and New England to the Queens and Long Island, northern most crossing of the East River. (no fixed crossings are in Long Island Sound) Opened in 1961.
- Tappan Zee Bridge (I-87, I-287) - Crosses the Hudson River, carrying NY Thruway and suburban traffic from Rockland and Westchester counties. Alternative to GW Bridge. Current span opened in 2017, former span opened in 1955.
- Newburgh-Beacon Bridge (I-84) - Crosses the Hudson River, carrying traffic from Pennsylvania and southeastern New York across the river to New England. Opened in 1963.
- Q Bridge (I-95) - Crosses the Quinnipiac River, carrying New Haven traffic along with traffic heading to New England or New York. Current span opened in 2012, original span opened in 1958.
- Baldwin Bridge (I-95) - Crosses the Connecticut River, carrying cross-state traffic and connecting Old Saybrook to New London. Opened in 1948.
- Jamestown/Newport Pell Bridges (RI 138) - Crosses Narraganset Bay, connecting Newport, Rhode Island to the rest of the state. Jamestown Bridge opened in 1992, Newport Pell opened in 1969.
- Charter Oak Bridge (CT 15/US 5) - Crosses the Connecticut River, connecting southern Hartford and I-91 northbound to East Hartford and I-84 eastbound. Opened in 1991.
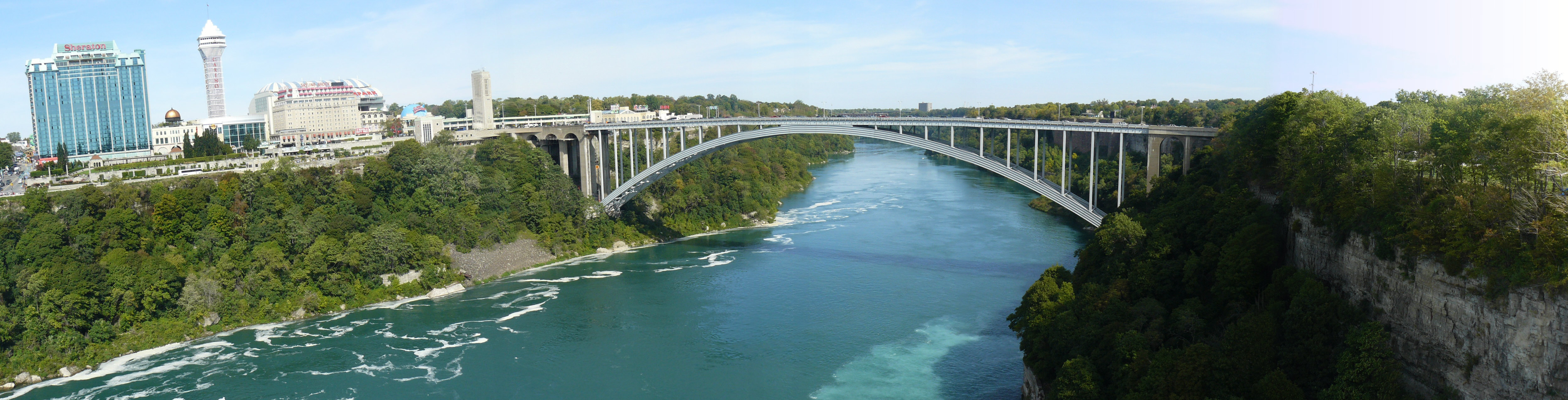
- The Rainbow Bridge, connecting New York to Canada nearby Niagara Falls.
  Bulkeley Bridge (I-84) - Crosses the Connecticut River, connecting Hartford area traffic across the river. The oldest interstate crossing in the US. Opened in 1908.
- Ted Williams Tunnel (I-90) - Crosses underneath Boston Harbor. Connects the Mass Pike and I-93 to East Boston and Logan Airport. Opened in 1995/2003.
- Zakim Bridge (I-93) - Crosses the Charles River, carrying Boston traffic to the northern Massachusetts and Maine/New Hampshire. Opened in 2003.
- Piscataqua River Bridge (I-95) - Crosses the Piscataqua River, carrying traffic from New Hampshire and Massachusetts to Maine. Opened in 1972.
- Peace Bridge (QEW/I-190) - Crosses the Niagara River, carrying traffic from Buffalo, New York into Ontario. Opened in 1927.
- Rainbow Bridge (NY 384/NY 104) - Crosses the Niagara River, carrying traffic from Niagara Falls, New York into Niagara Falls, Ontario. Opened in 1941.
- Lewiston-Queenston Bridge (I-190) Crosses the Niagara River, carrying traffic from Buffalo, New York into Ontario. Opened in 1962.

=== History ===
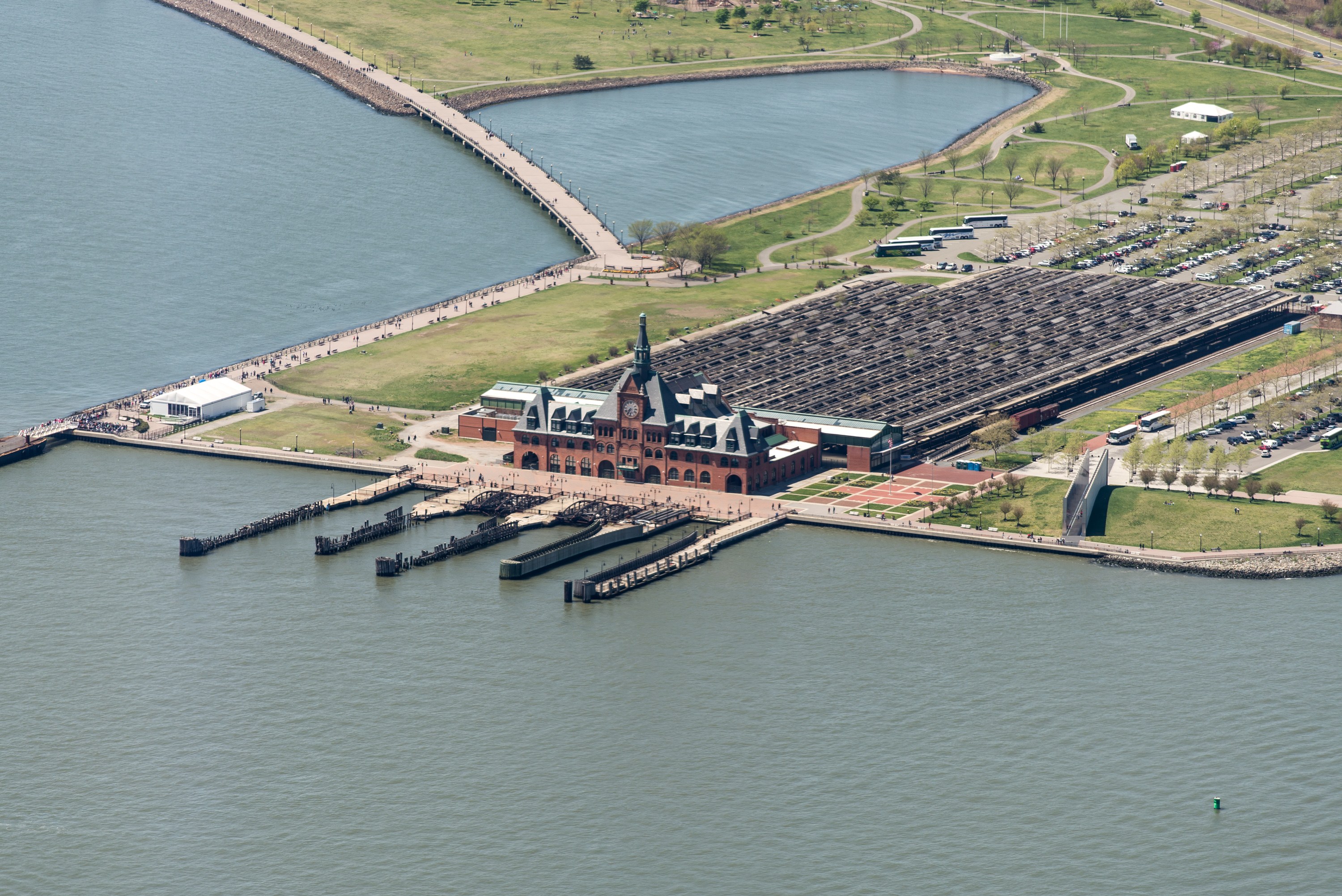
The Jersey City Terminal, a major rail and ferry connection between New Jersey and New York City.

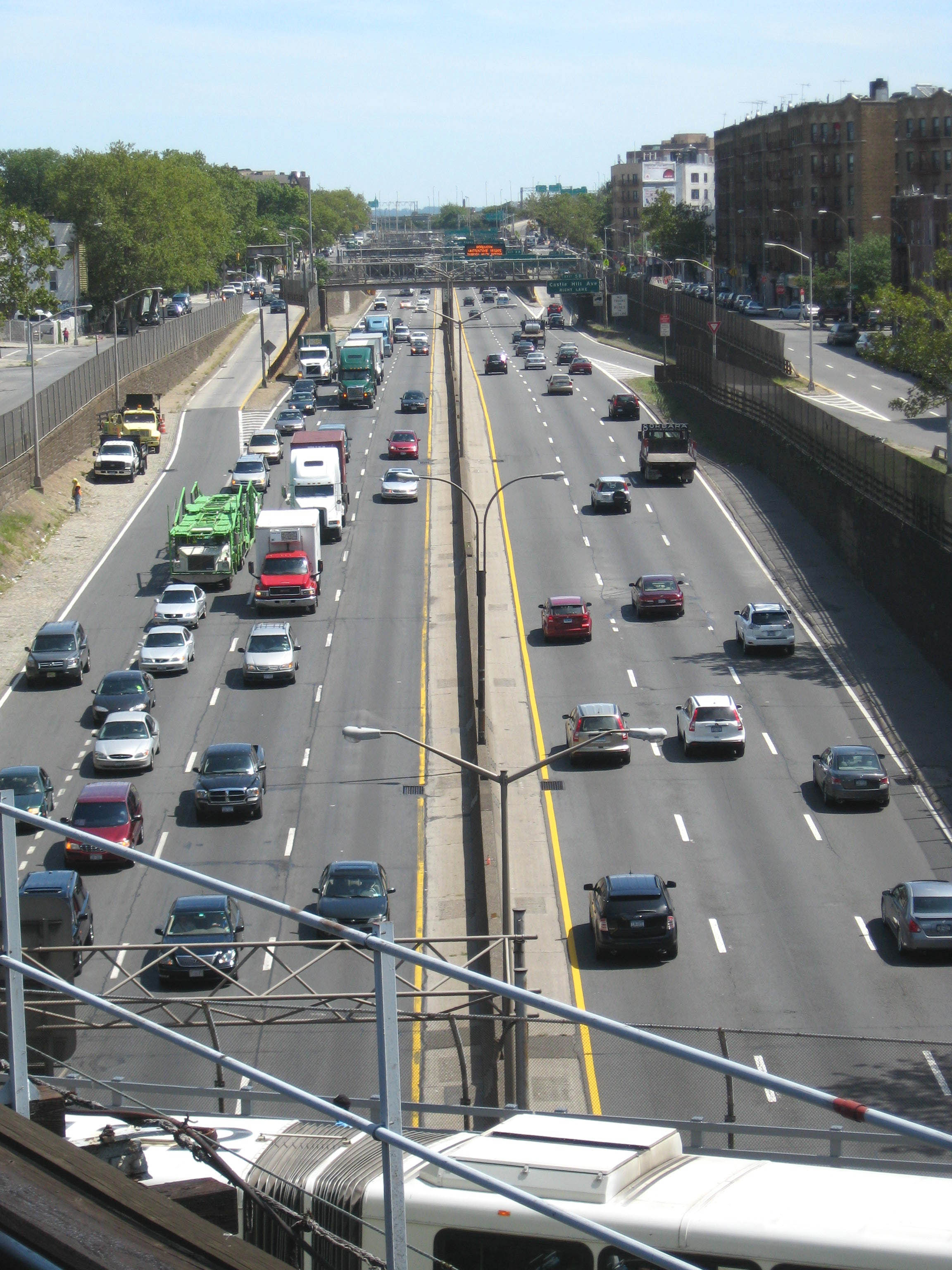
The Cross-Bronx Expressway (I-95) is an urban freeway which was built using slum clearance policies in the 1950s and 1960s. Today it is one of the most congested highways in the nation. It is regarded as a major cause for urban decay in the Bronx.

The Northeast has been a place for many firsts in transportation in the US, from the first commercial railroad in the US in Milton, Massachusetts (Granite Railway), first rapid transit system (MBTA Green Line), the first limited access road was the Bronx River Parkway, opened in 1922, New York is also where the first urban freeway was built in the late-1930s. (FDR Drive) The northeast would also be home to some of the first major freeway revolts in Greenwich Village, and would see the first major highway teardown (Miller Highway) in the 1970s.

Before European settlement, most of the Northeast was loosely connected by Native American trails, some of which would be incorporated into early-European settlement roads and turnpikes. One major early road was the Boston Post Road, connecting New York City and Boston along the Connecticut and Rhode Island coasts. Later these roads would be included in the King's Highway, spanning most of the east coast. Smaller turnpikes would also connect cities across the northeast. These roads would prove essential to moving goods across the English colonies in the 18th century and would later play a large part in the American Revolution.

The region saw a boom in canal-building in the early-19th century, with a major canal being the Erie Canal, opened in 1825, connecting the Great Lakes to the Hudson River and Atlantic Ocean through Western New York. The first railroads would be built in the late-1820s and would explode in mileage in the mid to late 19th century. Places like Philadelphia, New York, Boston, Newark, and Pittsburgh would become large water and rail hubs during the Industrial Revolution and would see tremendous booms in population and use.

Many large rivers in the northeast like the Hudson and Delaware would be slowly crossed with bridges starting in the 1800s, with the first fixed crossing of the Hudson River south of Albany being the Poughkeepsie Railroad Bridge, opened in 1889. The Delair Bridge, which would connect Philadelphia with New Jersey was opened six years later in 1896. The first crossing of the Hudson River into New York City would be the series of Hudson River PATH tunnels, being opened in 1908 and 1909. The first major vehicle tunnel would be the Holland Tunnel, opened up in 1927.

The start of highway construction would be the Bronx River Parkway and Long Island Motor Parkway, both of which started construction in the early-1900s. The rise of Robert Moses in New York would see the construction of many major road bridges and highways crossing the city and metro area. East River Drive (eventually renamed FDR Drive), was built along the corresponding river in Manhattan. The mid-20th century would see the rise of urban and suburban freeways and the decline of passenger and freight rail, with many lesser used tracks being abandoned or torn up during this time. It would also see the original Pennsylvania Station demolished in Midtown Manhattan during the mid-1960s. The construction of the Cross-Bronx Expressway in New York, Central Artery in Boston, and the Vine Street Expressway in Philadelphia tore up many ethnic and minority neighborhoods in the name of urban renewal. Many other highways were proposed during this era, like the Lower Manhattan Expressway and the Inner Belt in Boston, which were not built due to fierce highway revolts and rising costs. After the major highway revolts and rise of environmental concerns, new highway and interstate projects were mostly cancelled or shortened in the Northeast by the 1990s.

Despite the lack of new major road projects in the Northeast, the region has still continued to grow in population, resulting in the rise of alternative forms of transport like HOV lanes or commuter rails. This has led to the Northeast having one of the highest transit usage percentages in North America, with the Long Island Railroad being the most used commuter rail in the continent. One exception was the Big Dig, a major road project that would tear down the former elevated Central Artery (I-93) and instead tunnel it (and widen). It would also construct a new Charles River bridge and the Ted Williams Tunnel (I-90). This would end up becoming one of the costliest construction projects in the world, costing $21 billion adjusted to 2020 inflation. The former highway's path would become the Rose Kennedy Greenway, a large public park. The Sheridan Expressway (former I-895) was also rebuilt into a boulevard in the late-2010s. Rochester, New York has torn down the Inner Loop due to low traffic and to reunify neighborhoods in downtown and to create developable space.

== Culture ==
One geographer, Wilbur Zelinsky, asserts that the Northeast region lacks a unified cultural identity, but has served as a "culture hearth" for the rest of the nation. Several much smaller geographical regions within the Northeast have distinct cultural identities.

=== Landmarks ===
Almost half of the National Historic Landmarks maintained by the National Park Service are located in the Northeastern United States.

=== Religion ===
According to a 2009 Gallup poll, the Northeastern states differ from most of the rest of the U.S. in religious affiliation, generally reflecting the descendants of immigration patterns of the late 19th and early 20th centuries, with many Catholics arriving from Ireland, Italy, French Canada - Quebec, Portugal and east-central Europe. Massachusetts, Rhode Island, Connecticut, New York and New Jersey are the only states in the nation where Catholics outnumber Protestants and other Christian denominations. More than 20% of respondents in Maine, New Hampshire, and Vermont declared no religious identity. Compared to other U.S. regions, the Northeast, along with the Pacific Northwest, has had the lowest regular religious service attendance and the fewest people for whom religion is an important part of their daily lives as of 2015.

=== Sports ===
The Northeast region is home to numerous professional sports franchises in the "Big Four" leagues (NFL, NBA, NHL and MLB), with more than 100 championships collectively among them. Professional sports leagues such as the National Football League (NFL), Major League Baseball (MLB), National Basketball Association (NBA), Women's National Basketball Association (WNBA), National Hockey League (NHL), Major League Soccer (MLS), and National Women's Soccer League (NWSL), have team franchises in following Northeastern cities:

- New York metropolitan area: Giants, Jets (NFL), Yankees, Mets (MLB), Knicks, Nets (NBA), Rangers, Islanders, Devils (NHL), Red Bulls, City FC or Pigeons (MLS), Liberty (WNBA), Gotham or Bats (NWSL)
- Washington: Commanders (NFL), Nationals (MLB), Wizards (NBA), Capitals (NHL), United (MLS), Mystics (WNBA), Spirit (NWSL)
- Philadelphia: Eagles (NFL), Phillies (MLB), 76ers (NBA), Flyers (NHL), Union (MLS)
- Boston: Patriots (NFL), Red Sox (MLB), Celtics (NBA), Bruins (NHL), Revolution (MLS)
- Pittsburgh: Steelers (NFL), Pirates (MLB), Penguins (NHL)
- Baltimore: Ravens (NFL), Orioles (MLB)
- Buffalo: Bills (NFL), Sabres (NHL)
- Uncasville: Sun (WNBA)

Notable golf tournaments in the Northeastern United States include The Northern Trust, Travelers Championship, and Atlantic City LPGA Classic. The US Open, held in New York, is one of the four Grand Slam tennis tournaments.

Notable Northeastern motorsports tracks include Watkins Glen International, Pocono Raceway, New Hampshire Motor Speedway and Lime Rock Park, which have hosted Formula One, IndyCar, NASCAR and International Motor Sports Association races. Also, drag strips such as Englishtown, Epping and Reading have hosted NHRA national events. Belmont Park at New York hosts the Belmont Stakes horse races, which is part of the Triple Crown of Thoroughbred Racing.

The region has also been noted for the prevalence of the traditionally Northeastern sports of ice hockey and lacrosse.

== Politics ==
The Northeastern United States tended to vote Republican in federal elections through the first half of the 20th century, but the region has since the 1990s shifted to become the most Democratic region in the nation, along with the West Coast. Results from a 2008 Gallup poll indicated that eight of the top ten Democratic states were located in the region, with every Northeastern state having a Democratic Party affiliation advantage of at least ten points. The following table demonstrates Democratic support in the Northeast as compared to the remainder of the nation.

Year	% President vote		% Senate seats		% House seats	
Year	Northeast	Remainder	Northeast	Remainder	Northeast	Remainder
2000	57.6	47.5	60.0	46.3	59.6	45.7
2002			60.0	45.0	58.3	44.7
2004	57.1	47.3	60.0	40.0	59.5	43.0
2006			75.0	45.0	73.8	48.3
2008	60.7	52.0	80.0	52.5	81.0	52.9
2010			75.0	47.5	67.9	38.5

The following table of United States presidential election results since 1920 illustrates that over the past nine presidential elections, only three Northeastern states supported a Republican candidate. New Hampshire voted for George W. Bush in 2000; Pennsylvania and Maine's 2nd congressional district voted for Donald Trump in 2016, Maine's 2nd district voted for Trump again in 2020, and 2024 saw Trump take back Pennsylvania and again hold on to Maine's 2nd district. 2004 is so far the only election in U.S. history in which the winner did not win any northeastern state. Bolded entries indicate that party's candidate also won the general election.

State	1920	1924	1928	1932	1936	1940	1944	1948	1952	1956	1960	1964	1968	1972	1976	1980	1984	1988	1992	1996	2000	2004	2008	2012	2016	2020	2024
CT	R	R	**R**	R	**D**	**D**	**D**	R	R	R	**D**	D	D	**R**	R	**R**	R	**R**	D	D	D	D	D	D	D	**D**	D
ME	R	R	**R**	R	R	R	R	R	R	R	R	D	D	**R**	R	**R**	R	**R**	D	D	D	D	D	D	D (**R** ME-02)	**D** (R ME-02)	D (**R** ME-02)
MA	R	R	D	**D**	**D**	**D**	**D**	**D**	R	R	**D**	D	D	D	**D**	**R**	R	D	D	D	D	D	D	D	D	**D**	D
NH	R	R	**R**	R	**D**	**D**	**D**	R	R	R	R	D	**R**	**R**	R	**R**	R	**R**	D	D	**R**	D	D	D	D	**D**	D
NJ	R	R	**R**	**D**	**D**	**D**	**D**	R	R	R	**D**	D	**R**	**R**	R	**R**	R	**R**	D	D	D	D	D	D	D	**D**	D
NY	R	R	**R**	**D**	**D**	**D**	**D**	R	R	R	**D**	D	D	**R**	**D**	**R**	R	D	D	D	D	D	D	D	D	**D**	D
PA	R	R	**R**	R	**D**	**D**	**D**	R	R	R	**D**	D	D	**R**	**D**	**R**	R	**R**	D	D	D	D	D	D	**R**	**D**	**R**
RI	R	R	D	**D**	**D**	**D**	**D**	**D**	R	R	**D**	D	D	**R**	**D**	D	R	D	D	D	D	D	D	D	D	**D**	D
VT	R	R	**R**	R	R	R	R	R	R	R	R	D	**R**	**R**	R	**R**	R	**R**	D	D	D	D	D	D	D	**D**	D

The following table shows the breakdown of party affiliation of governors, attorneys general, state legislative houses and U.S. congressional delegation for the Northeastern states as of January 14, 2026. (Demographics reflect registration-by-party figures from that state's registered voter statistics.)

State	Governor	Attorney general	Upper House majority	Lower House majority	Senior U.S. senator	Junior U.S. senator	U.S. House delegation	Demographics
CT	Democratic	Democratic	Democratic; 25-11	Democratic; 102-49	Democratic	Democratic	Democratic; 5-0	Democratic; 35-21
ME	Democratic	Democratic	Democratic; 20-14-1	Democratic; 75-73-3	Republican	Independent	Democratic; 2-0	Democratic; 34-30
MA	Democratic	Democratic	Democratic; 35-5	Democratic; 134-25-1	Democratic	Democratic	Democratic; 9-0	Democratic; 26-8
NH	Republican	Republican	Republican; 16-8	Republican; 221-177-1	Democratic	Democratic	Democratic; 2-0	Republican; 33-28
NJ	Democratic	Democratic	Democratic; 25-15	Democratic; 57-23	Democratic	Democratic	Democratic; 9-3	Democratic; 38-25
NY	Democratic	Democratic	Democratic; 41-22	Democratic; 102-48	Democratic	Democratic	Democratic; 19-7	Democratic; 47-23
PA	Democratic	Republican	Republican; 27-23	Democratic; 102-101	Democratic	Republican	Republican; 10-7	Democratic; 43-41
RI	Democratic	Democratic	Democratic; 33-4	Democratic; 65-9-1	Democratic	Democratic	Democratic; 2-0	Democratic; 36-14
VT	Republican	Democratic	Democratic; 16-13-1	Democratic; 87-56-4-3	Independent	Democratic	Democratic; 1-0	Democratic; 53-20

== See also ==
- List of online encyclopedias of U.S. states
- Atlantic Northeast
- Jersey Shore
- New England–Acadian forests
- Northeast Corridor
- Northeast megalopolis
- Northeastern coastal forests
- Rust Belt
