= Mass Central Rail Trail =

Partially completed rail trail in Massachusetts

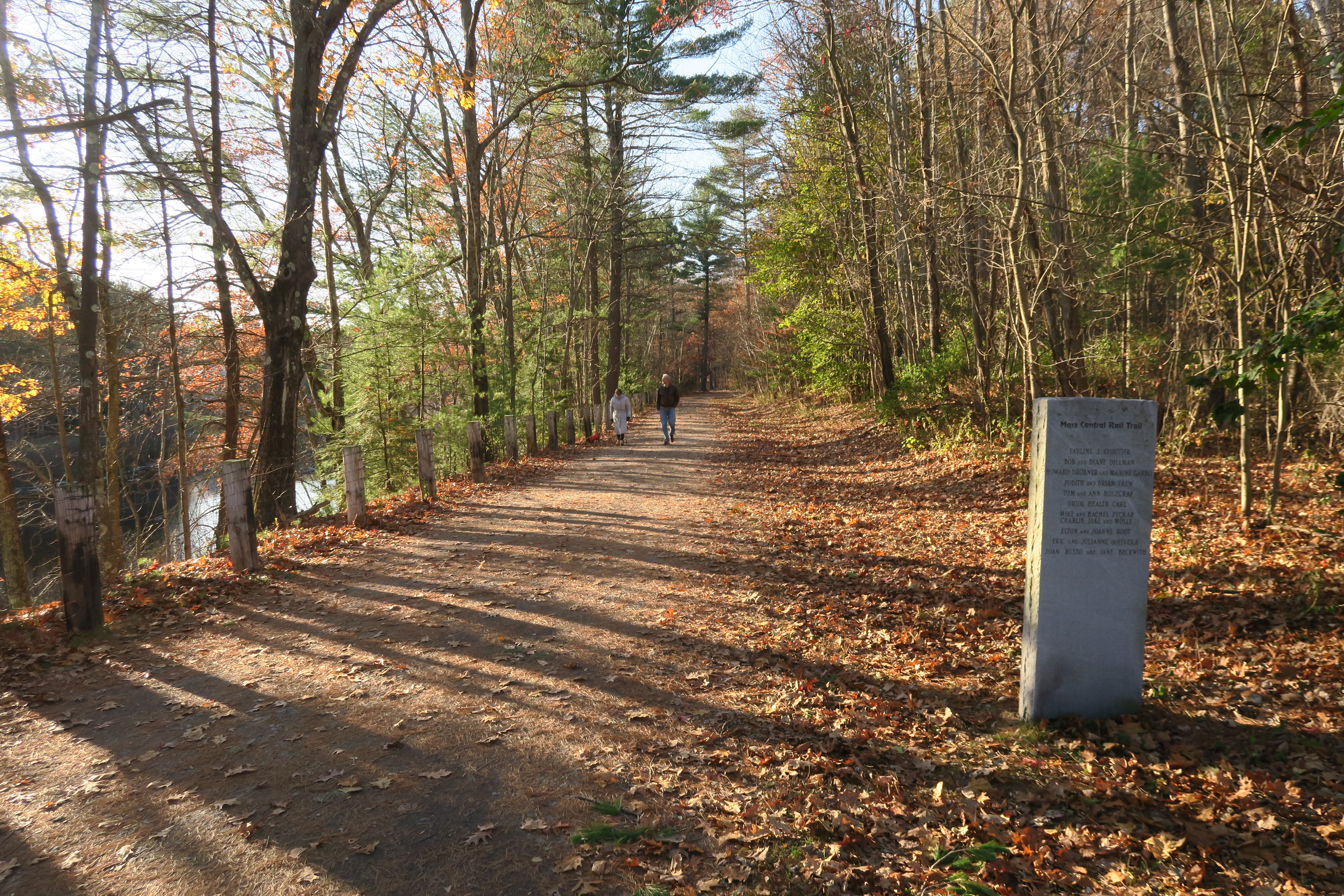
- Mass Central Rail Trail with stele thanking benefactors in Wachusett Greenways section, Oakdale, West Boylston
- Length: 67 miles (108 km) completed; 72 miles (116 km) open (including unimproved segments); 92 miles (148 km) protected; Over 110 miles (180 km) planned
- Location: Union Station (Northampton) to North Station (Boston)
- Established: 1985 Linear Park, 1993 Norwottuck Rail Trail, 1997 MCRT West Boylston
- Use: Hiking, bicycling, inline skating, wheelchairs, strollers, cross-country skiing, horseback riding
- Difficulty: Easy
- Season: Year-round
- Surface: Stone dust, asphalt, dirt, unimproved
- Right of way: Former Massachusetts Central Railroad, former Central Massachusetts Railroad, former Marlborough Branch of Fitchburg Railroad, Fitchburg Line, former Fitchburg Cutoff, Green Line Extension
- Maintainer: Primary maintainers: Department of Conservation and Recreation (DCR); Wachusett Greenways; East Quabbin Land Trust; Clinton Greenway Conservation Trust; Northampton; Belchertown; Ware; Hardwick; West Boylston; Hudson; Belmont; Cambridge; Somerville
- Website: masscentralrailtrail.org

Mass Central Rail Trail map
- Green: Asphalt Paved; Light Green: Stone Dust; Blue: Open, Unimproved; Orange: Under Construction

The Mass Central Rail Trail (MCRT) is a partially completed shared-use rail trail extending across Massachusetts between Northampton and Boston. It primarily follows the right-of-way (ROW) of the former 104-mile (167 km) Massachusetts Central Railroad (later the Central Massachusetts Railroad), supplemented by off-corridor routes that bring the total planned length to over 110 miles (180 km). Crossing Hampshire, Hampden, Worcester, Middlesex, and Suffolk counties through Central Massachusetts and Greater Boston, it is the longest developing cross-state rail trail in Massachusetts.

The original rail corridor suffered catastrophic damage during the 1938 New England hurricane, which triggered decades of phased abandonments. In the late 20th century, state agencies, municipalities, and regional land trusts began converting disjointed segments of the dormant line into multi-use paths. Early paths, such as Cambridge's Linear Park (1985), the Norwottuck Rail Trail (1993), and the Somerville Community Path, were initially developed as independent local projects before being unified under the continuous MCRT designation.

Subsequent segments were established explicitly to build the cross-state network, starting with the Mass Central Rail Trail in West Boylston (1997) and later the 23-mile (37 km) Mass Central Rail Trail—Wayside. As of 2026, 67 miles (108 km) are completed with asphalt or stone-dust surfaces, 72 miles (116 km) are open to public use including unimproved dirt paths, and 92 miles (148 km) of the corridor are open or protected for future trail development. The Mass Central Rail Trail Alliance, a nonprofit that supports the build and operation of the MCRT, maintains an interactive map of the MCRT and other Massachusetts trails.

== Trail sections ==
=== Northampton and Norwottuck Branch of the Mass Central Rail Trail ===
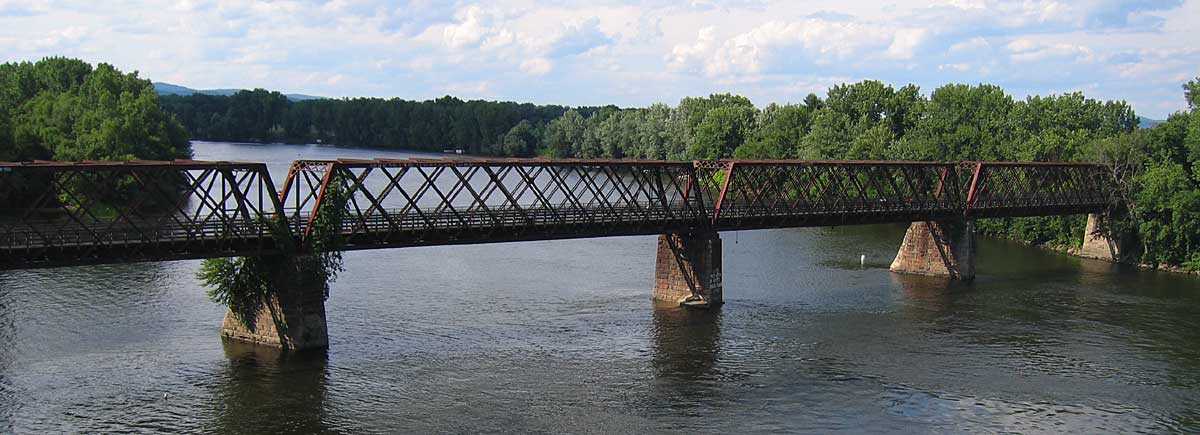
Norwottuck Rail Trail Bridge, Northampton

The trail is complete and asphalt paved through Northampton, Hadley, Amherst, and western Belchertown.

The Mass Central Rail Trail's western terminus is at Northampton Union Station, on a segment maintained by the City of Northampton. From the station, it runs 0.9 miles (1.4 km) east to Woodmont Road alongside the active Connecticut River Line, an example of rails with trails. East of Woodmont Road, the Norwottuck Branch of the Mass Central Rail Trail extends 11 miles (18 km) from Northampton through Hadley and Amherst, continuing 1,300 feet (400 m) into Belchertown as a state park maintained by the Department of Conservation and Recreation (DCR). The trail crosses the Connecticut River between Northampton and Hadley via the Norwottuck Rail Trail Bridge, a 1,492-foot (455 m), eight-span steel lattice truss bridge originally built in 1887. Opened in 1993 as the Norwottuck Rail Trail, it was one of the last formal paved bikeways in the United States built to an 8-foot (2.4 m) width; during a 2015 reconstruction, the path was widened to 10 feet (3.0 m) to meet updated Massachusetts Department of Transportation (MassDOT) minimum standards for shared-use paths. Just east of Station Road in Amherst to its eastern terminus in Belchertown, the trail again operates as a rails-with-trails corridor parallel to the active New England Central Railroad.

==== Norwottuck connecting trails ====
All rail trails within Northampton, including the MCRT, form part of the municipally maintained Northampton Rail Trail System (with the exception of the DCR-maintained Norwottuck Branch). The Friends of Northampton Trails, a local trail advocacy nonprofit, treats the city's network as a unified system rather than naming individual corridors. A 5-mile (8.0 km) spur extending northwest from downtown Northampton toward Look Park and Williamsburg—sometimes called the Francis P. Ryan Bikeway—follows the former New Haven and Northampton Company Williamsburg Branch rather than the Central Massachusetts Railroad and is excluded from the MCRT's 104 miles (167 km) railroad corridor tally. Another 3.5-mile (5.6 km) city segment running south toward Easthampton forms the northernmost link of the New Haven and Northampton Canal Greenway, which continues south as the Manhan Rail Trail. The MCRT and the Canal Greenway together form part of the regional New England Rail-Trail Network. In Amherst, the Arthur R. Swift Amherst/UMass Bike Connector links the Norwottuck Branch to the University of Massachusetts Amherst campus, and the New England National Scenic Trail intersects the branch's eastern terminus.

=== Belchertown Greenway ===
The Mass Central Rail Trail heads roughly southeast through Belchertown, where it is locally designated as the Belchertown Greenway. Most protected segments consist of unimproved hiking paths or cleared dirt corridors used by pedestrians, cyclists, and snowmobiles. Much of the Belchertown corridor between Bay Road and North Washington Street runs parallel to the active New England Central Railroad, forming a rails-with-trails alignment.

MCRT Belchertown Greenway segments (west to east)
Segment	Endpoints	Municipality	Length	Surface	Status	Year opened
Gap	Norwottuck Branch of the Mass Central Rail Trail (Warren Wright Road) to Hamilton Street	Belchertown	—	N/A	Unimproved	—
MCRT Belchertown Greenway (north)	Hamilton Street to George Hannum Street	Belchertown	1 mile (1.6 km)	Dirt / footpath	Open, unimproved	—
MCRT Belchertown Greenway (MassDOT phase)	George Hannum Street to State Street (Route 202)	Belchertown	1.2 miles (1.9 km)	Dirt / footpath (planned asphalt)	In design (open, unimproved)	—
Gap	State Street (Route 202) to Springfield Road	Belchertown	—	N/A	Unimproved	—
MCRT Belchertown Greenway (south)	Springfield Road to Franklin Street (Route 181)	Belchertown	3.2 miles (5.1 km)	Cleared dirt (Jabish Brook Bridge under construction)	Open, unimproved	—
Gap	Franklin Street (Route 181) to Palmer town line	Belchertown	—	N/A	Unimproved	—

From Warren Wright Road to Lake Arcadia, the former rail right-of-way is privately owned and largely obliterated by development, aside from a short segment within the Holland Glen Conservation Area. The Town of Belchertown owns the right-of-way from Lake Arcadia past Federal Street for future trail development. Between Hamilton Street and State Street (Route 202), the corridor is a 2.2-mile (3.5 km) unimproved hiking path; a 1.2-mile (1.9 km) subsection from George Hannum Street (at Austin Gaughan Memorial Field) to State Street received a 2026 MassTrails design and permitting grant. As of 2026, MassDOT construction is scheduled for spring 2031. A gap in public ownership remains between State Street and Springfield Road.

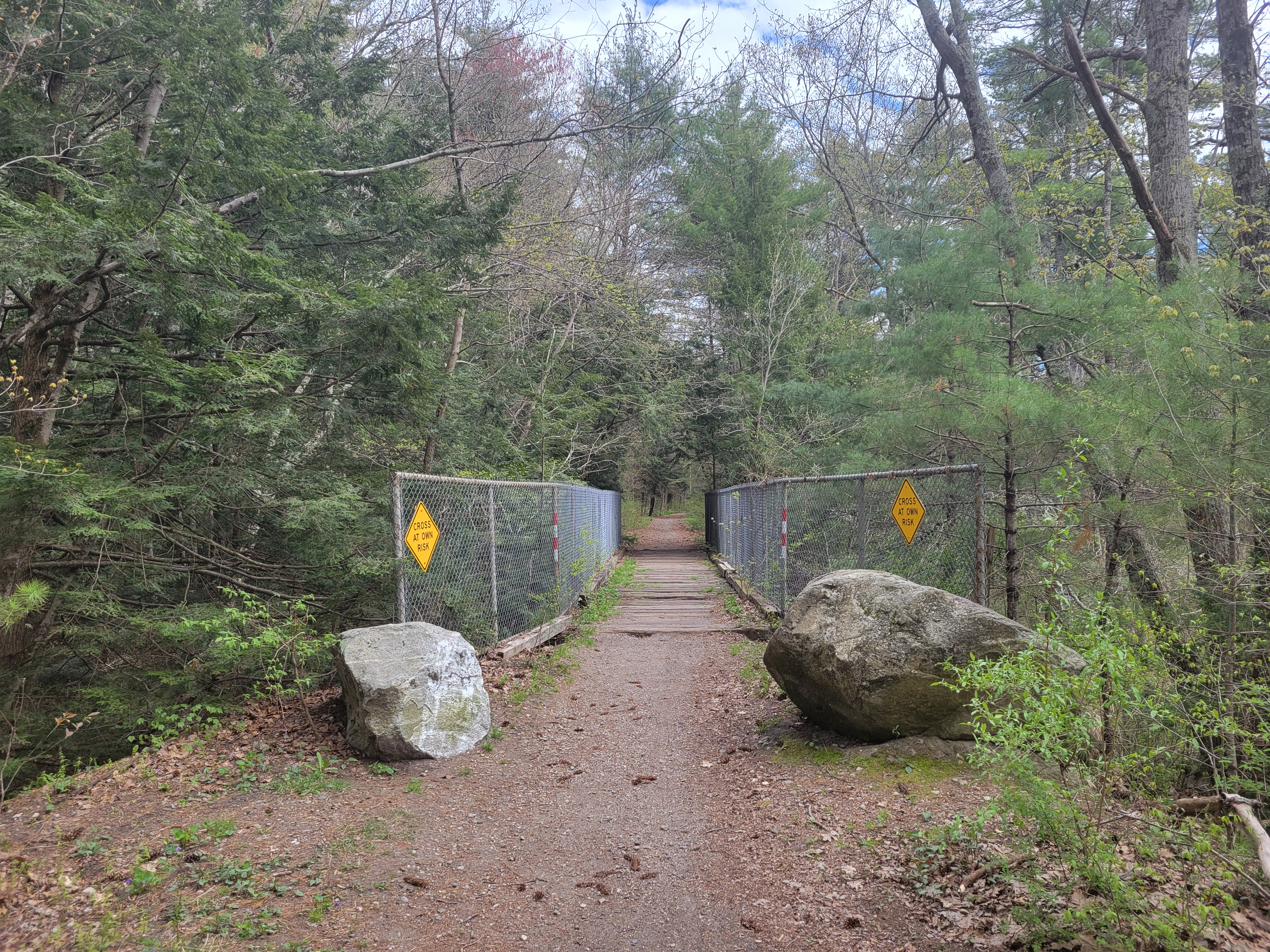
Belchertown Greenway timber trestle bridge over Jabish Brook

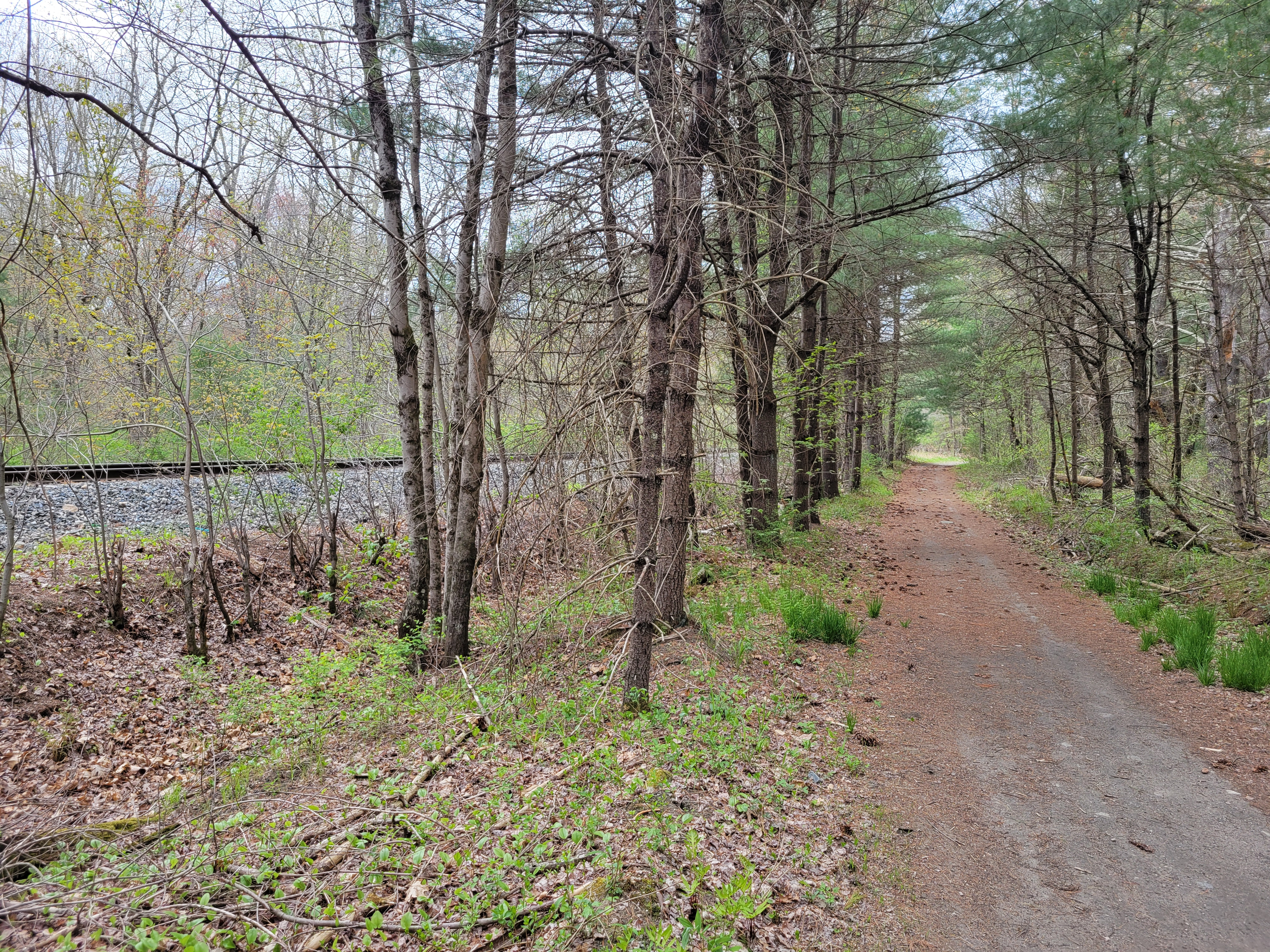
Belchertown Greenway parallel to New England Central Railroad

From Springfield Road to Franklin Street (Route 181), the town owns a continuous 3.2-mile (5.1 km) cleared dirt corridor. Following an engineering assessment commissioned by the Friends of the Belchertown Greenway and a 2025 MassTrails construction grant, rehabilitation of the historic railroad timber trestle bridge over Jabish Brook (between North Washington Street and Route 181) began in 2026. East of Route 181 to the Rabbit Run Trail—just west of the Swift River and the Palmer town line—the remaining right-of-way is privately owned and closed to the public.

==== Belchertown connecting trails ====
The New England National Scenic Trail crosses the western end of the Belchertown Greenway near the Norwottuck Branch terminus. At the eastern end, a short on-road connection along Route 181 and Depot Street links the MCRT to the southern terminus of the Rabbit Run Trail, a 2.3-mile (3.7 km) hiking trail that follows the former Springfield, Athol and North-eastern Railroad right-of-way north along the Swift River.

=== Quabbin Valley and East Quabbin Land Trust ===
Within the Quabbin Valley, the former rail corridor heads southeast from the Belchertown border in Palmer to the Ware River, then turns northeast and continues through Ware, Hardwick, New Braintree, and Barre. Across the East Quabbin region—spanning Ware, Hardwick, New Braintree, and Barre—most completed segments feature a hard-packed stone-dust surface, except for the asphalt-paved Grenville Park. These segments were developed by the nonprofit East Quabbin Land Trust (EQLT), the respective municipalities, or partnerships between them.

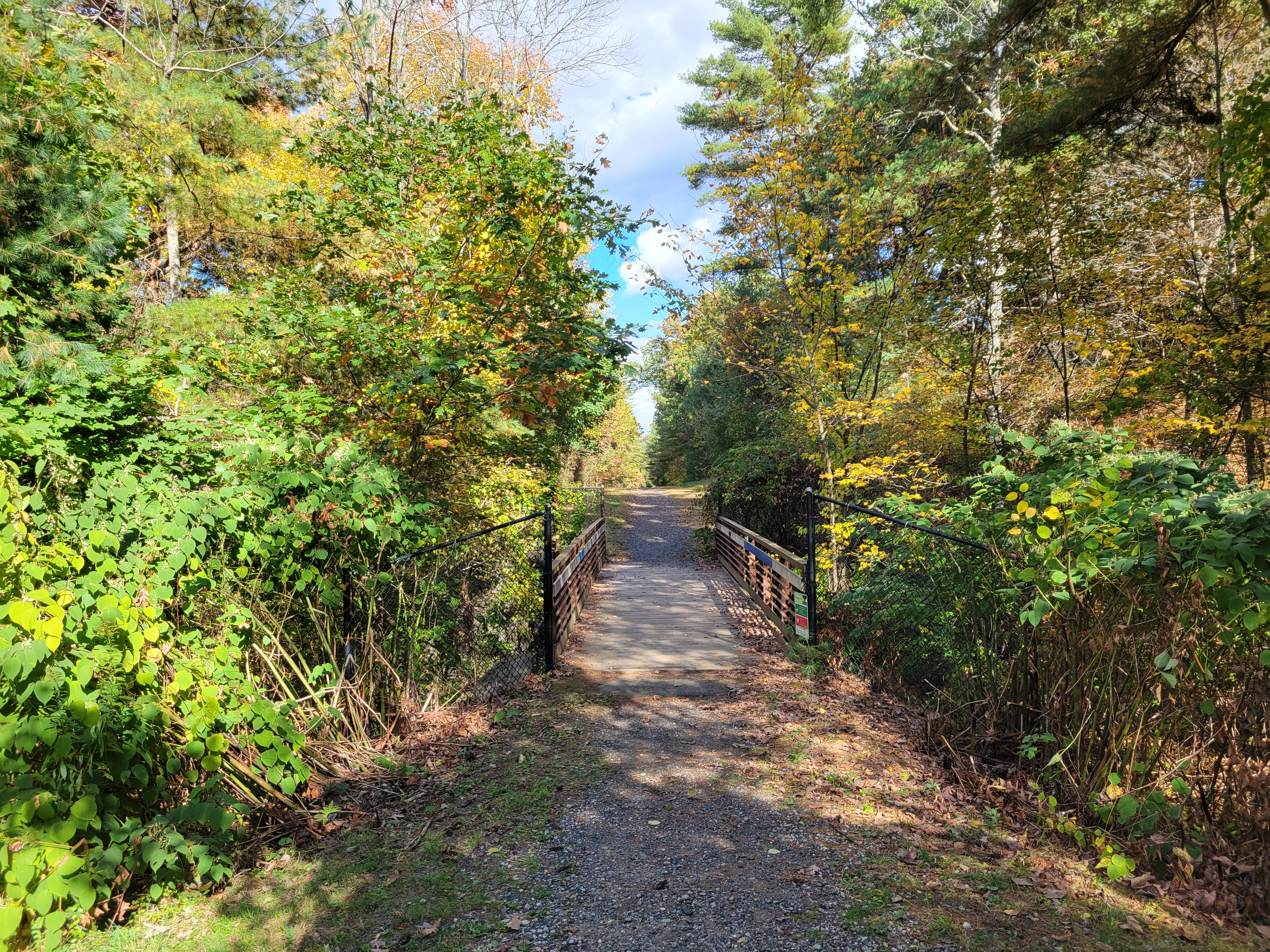
MCRT: Gibbs Crossing, bridge over Flat Brook, Ware

MCRT Quabbin Valley and East Quabbin region segments (west to east)
Segment	Endpoints	Municipality	Length	Surface	Status	Year opened
Palmer corridor	Swift River to Gibbs Crossing	Palmer, Ware	—	Rails in place / overgrown	Unimproved (feasibility study)	—
MCRT: Gibbs Crossing	Gibbs Crossing to Robbins Road	Ware	1.7 miles (2.7 km)	Stone dust	Complete	2023
Gap	Robbins Road to Park Street	Ware	—	N/A	Unimproved	—
Grenville Park	Park Street to Grenville Park Connector Trail	Ware	0.9 miles (1.4 km)	Asphalt	Complete	1907 (Note: Grenville Park was opened in 1907 by the Town of Ware. The park's shared use with the MCRT by connecting to MCRT: Ware began in the 2020s.)
Grenville Park Connector Trail	Grenville Park to MCRT: Ware	Ware	0.3 miles (0.48 km)	Stone dust	Complete	2026
MCRT: Ware	Grenville Park Connector to near Ware–Hardwick Covered Bridge	Ware	2.7 miles (4.3 km)	Stone dust	Complete	2022
Gap	Near Ware–Hardwick Covered Bridge to western bridge approach	Ware	0.2 miles (0.32 km)	N/A	Unimproved	—
MCRT: Ware River Park	Ware–Hardwick Covered Bridge to St. Aloysius Cemetery	Ware, Hardwick	1.0 mile (1.6 km)	Stone dust	Complete	2014 / 2023
Gap	St. Aloysius Cemetery to Creamery Road	Hardwick	—	N/A	Unimproved	—
MCRT: New Braintree and Hardwick	Creamery Road to Ware River (Wheelwright)	Hardwick, New Braintree	2.9 miles (4.7 km)	Stone dust	Complete	2007
MCRT: Wheelwright to McEvoy Road	Ware River to McEvoy Road	Hardwick, New Braintree	0.3 miles (0.48 km)	Planned stone dust	In design (bridge & trail)	—
MCRT: New Braintree to Barre Plains	McEvoy Road to Station Road	New Braintree, Barre	1.9 miles (3.1 km)	Stone dust	Complete	2026
Gap	Station Road to MCRT: Barre, Oakham, and Rutland at Route 122	Barre	—	N/A	Unimproved	—

In Palmer, the former railroad bridge over the Swift River was demolished after rail service ended, leaving no river crossing. Beginning in the village of Bondsville, the corridor retains its historic rails, ties, and Ware River bridge, but is overgrown and in use by the active shortline Massachusetts Central Railroad (MCER), which is distinct from the historic railroad of the same name. A 2025 MassTrails grant funded a feasibility study to evaluate two potential trail alignments through Palmer.

Continuing into Ware, the corridor remains in active freight use by MCER, and a missing bridge over the Ware River blocks access south of the Gibbs Crossing shopping plaza. Four trail sections lie entirely within Ware:

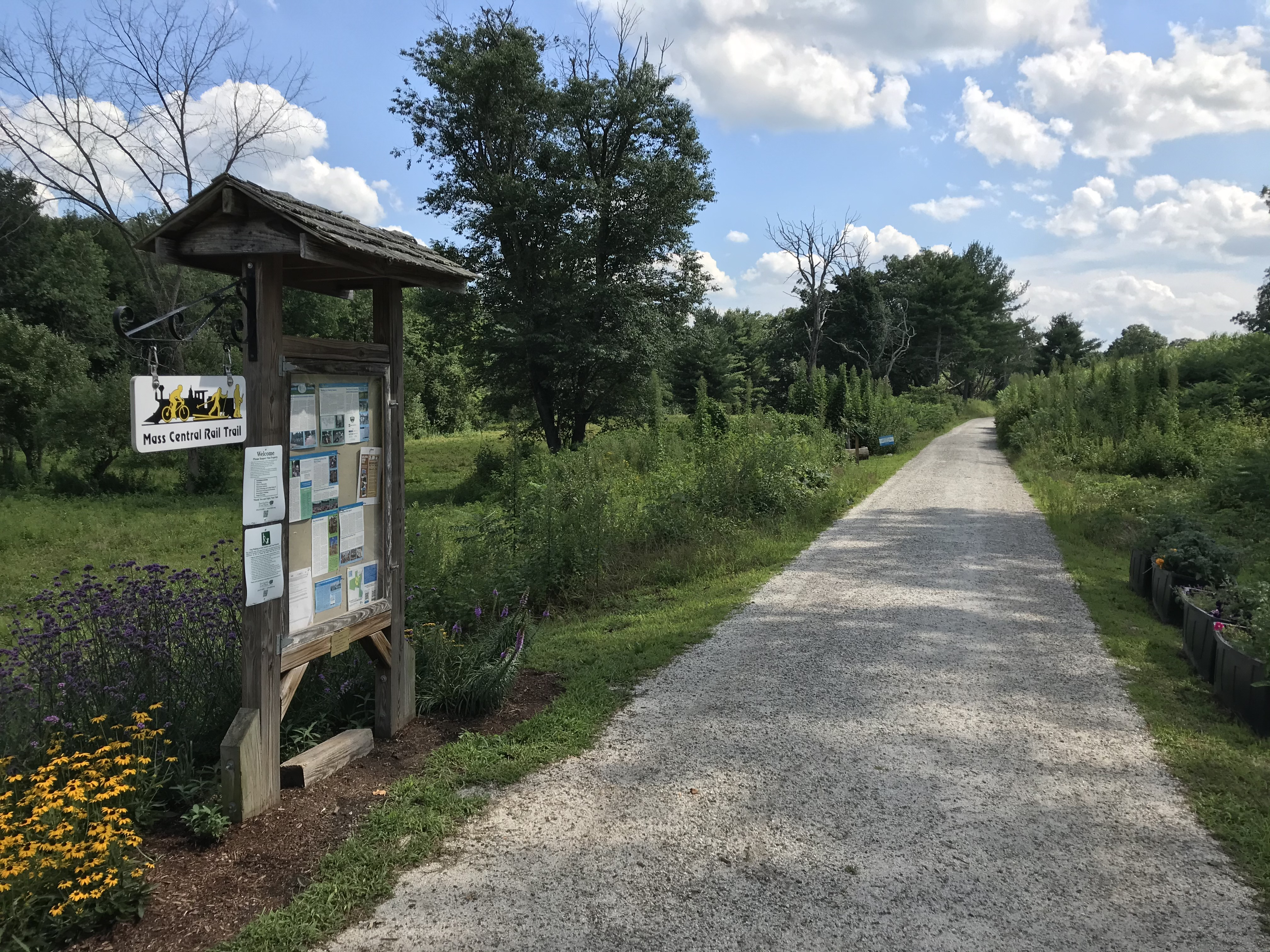
MCRT: Ware, kiosk at Church Street

- MCRT: Gibbs Crossing: A 1.7-mile (2.7 km) segment from Gibbs Crossing to Robbins Road owned and maintained by the Town of Ware, that opened in 2023.
- Grenville Park: North of Robbins Road, two missing river bridges and an active MCER rail yard block the original right-of-way. Following an on-road detour, users connect to a 0.9-mile (1.4 km) paved path through a portion of Grenville Park.
- Grenville Park Connector Trail: An accessible 0.3-mile (0.48 km) stone-dust trail was completed by the town, in partnership with EQLT, in September 2026. It connects Grenville Park to the MCRT: Ware segment.
- MCRT: Ware: A 2.7-mile (4.3 km) segment extending from Frohloff Farm across Upper Church Street to just south of the Ware–Hardwick Covered Bridge, managed by EQLT, which purchased Frohloff Farm in 2018 and completed a trail expansion in 2022. A short unimproved gap remains immediately south of the covered bridge.

In the Hardwick village of Gilbertville, the town owns the 1-mile (1.6 km) MCRT: Ware River Park segment, running from the covered bridge in Ware to Saint Aloysius Cemetery. Originally constructed as the Gilbertville Fitness Trail in 2014, it was upgraded to MCRT standards using a 2022 state grant of $133,000 and reopened in 2023. North of Gilbertville along Route 32 to Creamery Road, the right-of-way is lost to private development and a missing bridge over the active rail line.

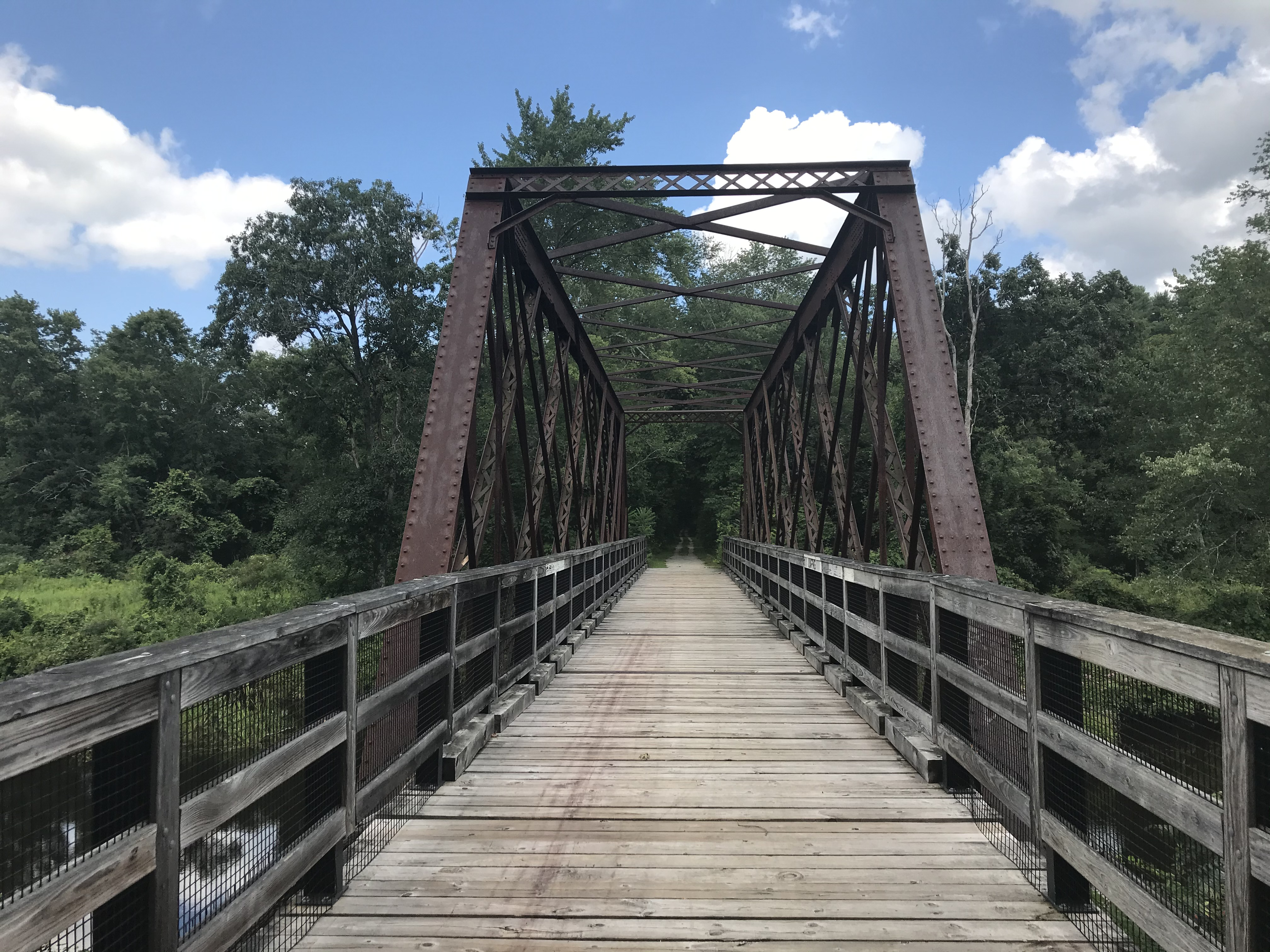
MCRT: New Braintree and Hardwick, lattice truss bridge over Ware River entering New Braintree

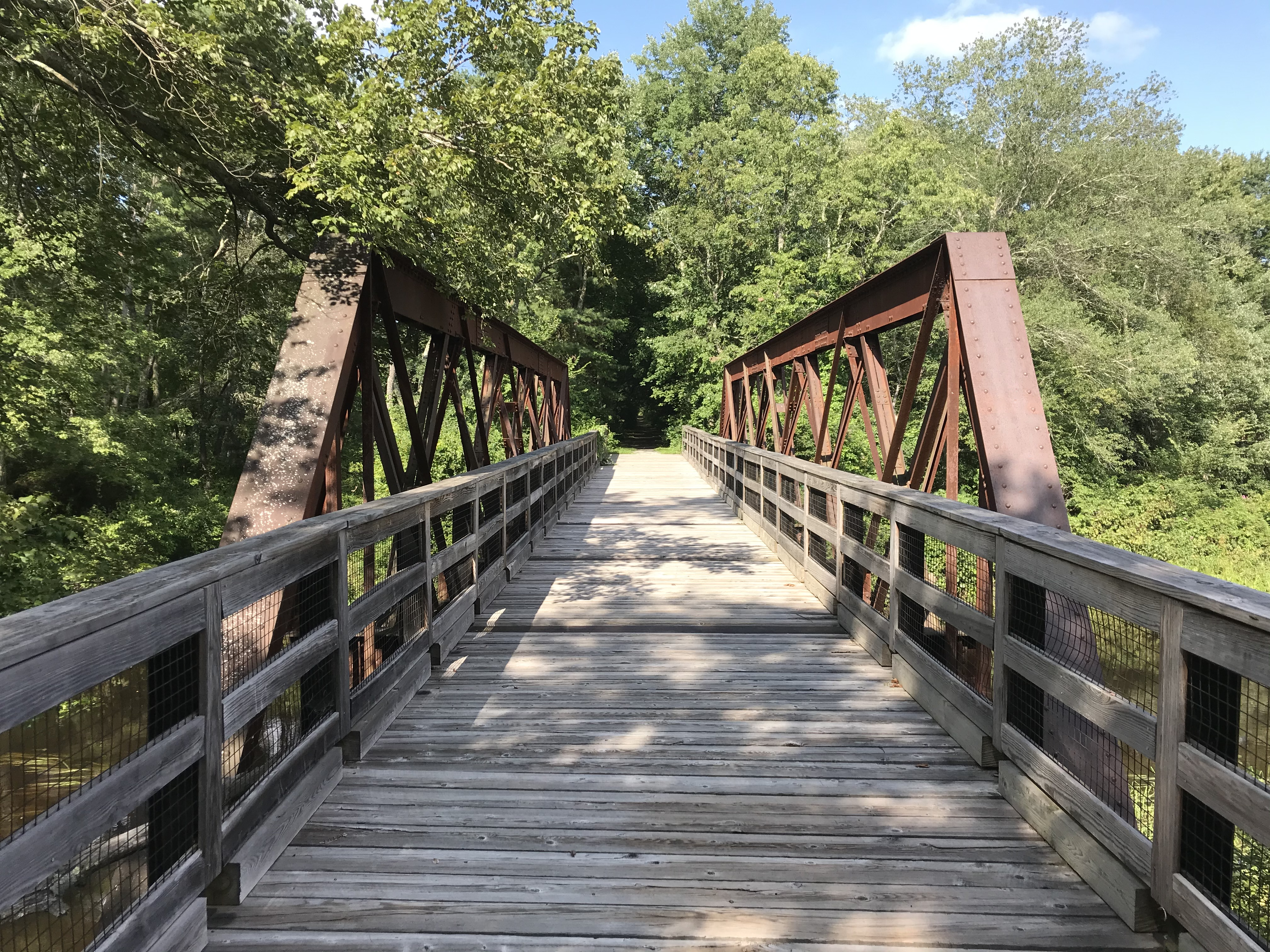
MCRT: New Braintree and Hardwick, pony truss bridge over Ware River entering Wheelwright

From Creamery Road in Hardwick to Maple Street in the village of Wheelwright, EQLT owns and maintains the 2.9-mile (4.7 km), stone-dust MCRT: New Braintree and Hardwick. When the corridor was listed for sale in 2005, the newly formed Central Highlands Conservancy LLC purchased the land and held it at cost for two years while EQLT conducted a capital campaign, preserving both the right-of-way and three historic bridges from being scrapped. The segment crosses back and forth across the Ware River—via a lattice truss bridge into New Braintree and a pony truss bridge back into Wheelwright—and both steel bridges were re-decked using a 2023 MassTrails grant. North of Maple Street, a missing bridge over the Ware River interrupts the route; a 2026 MassTrails grant funded design and permitting for a replacement crossing, beyond which EQLT is designing a 0.3-mile (0.48 km) stone-dust connection to McEvoy Road.

From McEvoy Road in New Braintree to Station Road in Barre Plains, the 1.9-mile (3.1 km) MCRT: New Braintree to Barre Plains segment opened in September 2026. Development of this stretch was enabled in 2024, when EQLT acquired the former Tanner-Hiller Airport on behalf of the Massachusetts Department of Fish and Game to establish the Menameset Habitat wildlife sanctuary—securing public access across the property and former rail bed—and continued with a 2025 MassTrails construction grant.

=== Wachusett Greenways ===
Wachusett Greenways, a nonprofit land trust, has completed about 20 miles (32 km) of the planned 30 miles (48 km) of the MCRT across Barre, Oakham, Rutland, Holden, West Boylston, and Sterling, including eight bridges. All of the improved off-road sections feature a hard-packed stone dust surface.

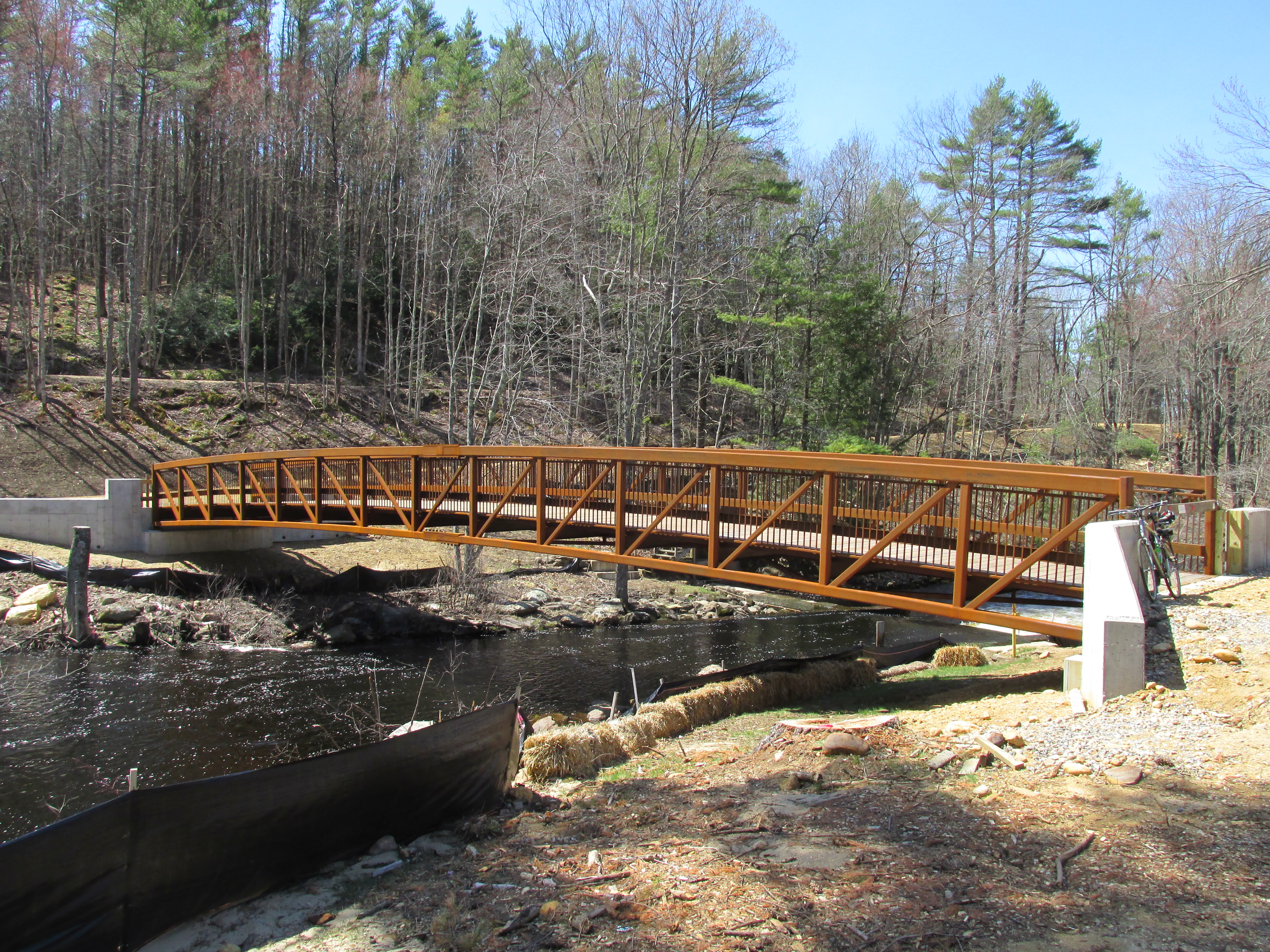
White Valley bridge over Ware River, Barre

MCRT Wachusett Greenways segments (west to east)
Segment	Endpoints	Municipality	Length	Surface	Status	Year opened
MCRT: Barre, Oakham, and Rutland	Route 122 (Barre) to Glenwood Road (Rutland) (includes 0.1 miles (0.16 km) on-road along Miles Road in Rutland)	Barre, Oakham, Rutland	8.8 miles (14.2 km)	Stone dust (short on-road)	Complete	Before 2006–2024
Gap	Glenwood Road to Wachusett Street	Rutland	—	N/A	Unimproved	—
MCRT: Rutland (Muschopauge)	Wachusett Street to Rutland–Holden town line	Rutland	1.1 miles (1.8 km)	Stone dust	Complete	
Gap	Rutland–Holden town line to Princeton Street (Holden)	Holden	—	N/A	Unimproved	—
MCRT: Holden and West Boylston	Princeton Street (Holden) to Thomas Street (Oakdale) (includes 0.5 miles (0.80 km) on-road along Mill Street in Holden)	Holden, West Boylston	8.6 miles (13.8 km)	Stone dust (short on-road)	Complete	1997–2025
Gap	Thomas Street (Oakdale) to West Boylston Street (Clinton)	West Boylston, Sterling, Clinton	—	N/A	Unimproved	—

From Station Road to Route 122, the ROW in Barre is either obstructed by private development or part of an active section of the MCER. There are three open trail sections that were built in partnership with Wachusett Greenways:

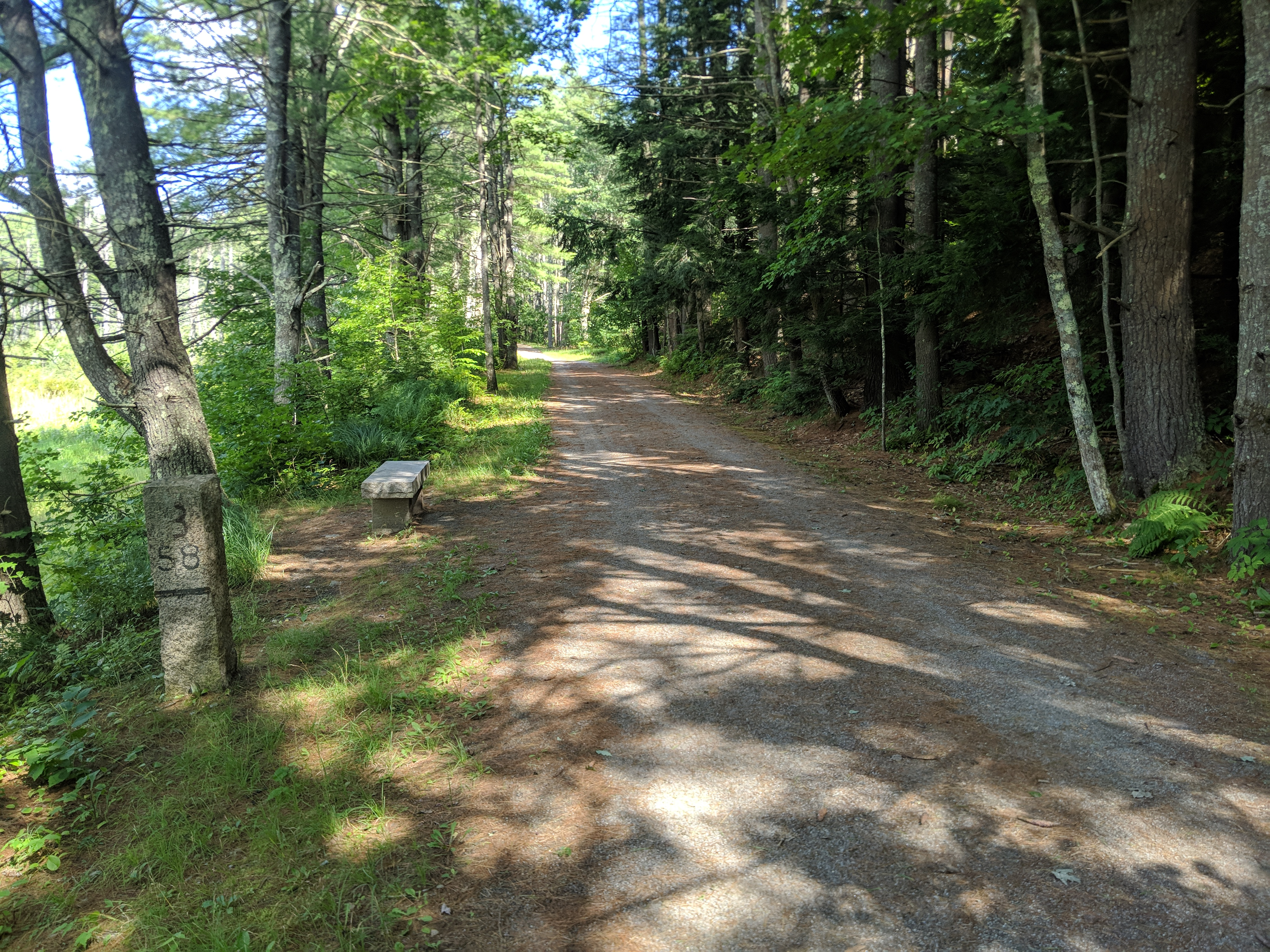
B = Boston 58 miles (93 km) marker. The opposite side will read N 46. Original paint. Oakham

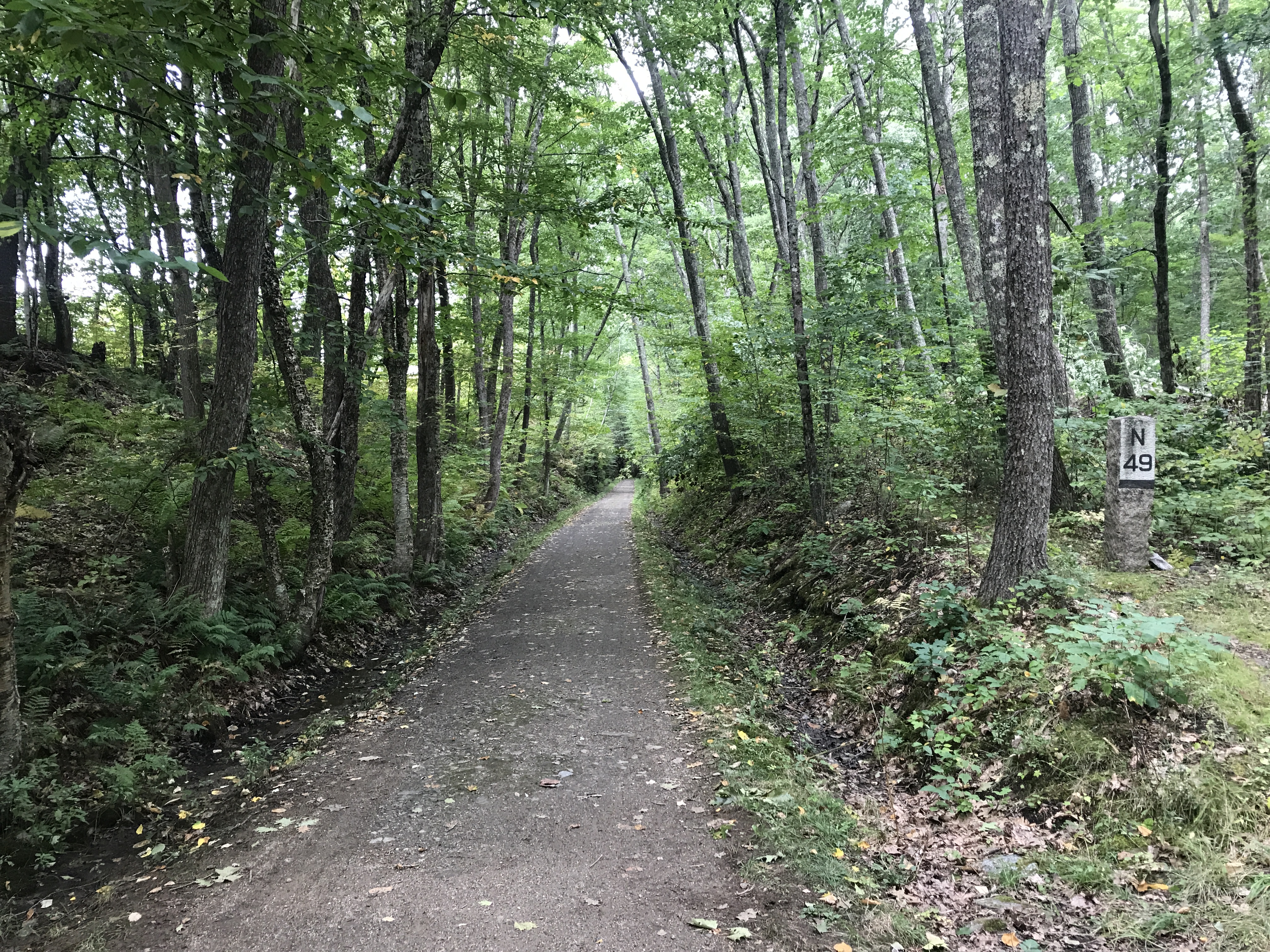
N = Northampton 49 miles (79 km) marker. The opposite side will read B 55. Rutland

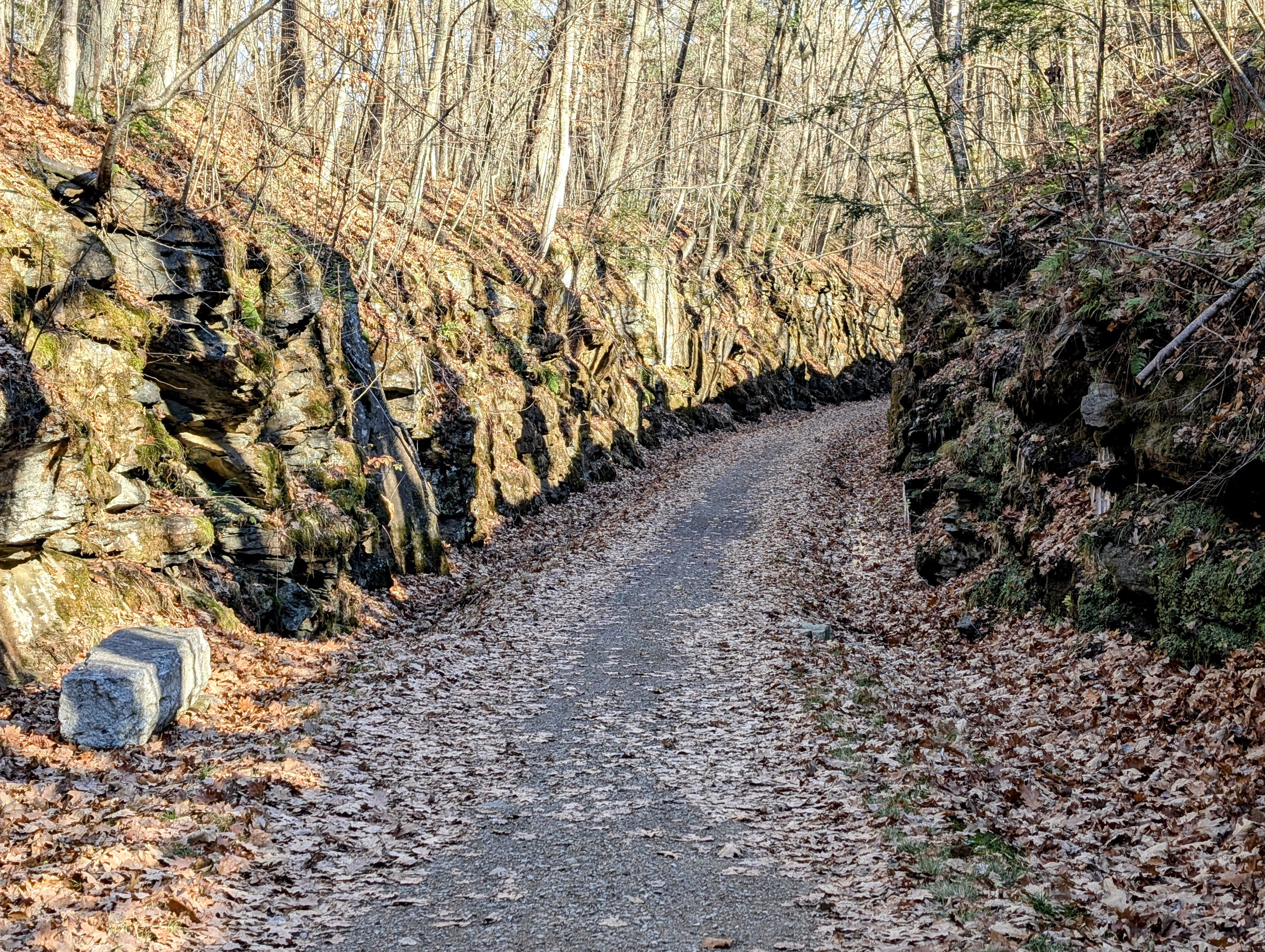
Charnock Cut, Rutland

- MCRT: Barre, Oakham, and Rutland: An 8.8-mile (14.2 km) continuous section from Route 122 (Worcester Road) in the White Valley village of Barre through Oakham to Glenwood Road in Rutland is complete and open, including a 0.1 miles (0.16 km) on-road connection along Miles Road in Rutland. Structures along this stretch include the Charnock Tunnel (installed in 2006), the Pommogussett Tunnel (2011), and the White Valley Bridge over the Ware River (2014). The Coldbrook Bridge over the Ware River was restored in 2024. The segment also passes through the Charnock Cut, the highest elevation on the MCRT, where the railroad blasted through deep rock ledge. Excavation of the cut began in 1872 for the Massachusetts Central Railroad, initially requiring an estimated 60,000 cubic yards (46,000 m^{3}) of fill removal; after the Panic of 1873 halted construction, work resumed in 1880 using steam drills to blast an additional 12,000 cubic yards (9,200 m^{3}) of rock. The corridor is owned by DCR and maintained by Wachusett Greenways.
  - Between Glenwood Road and Wachusett Street in Rutland, the historic right-of-way is interrupted by roadway and development, requiring an on-road detour.
- MCRT: Rutland (Muschopauge): From Wachusett Street in the Muschopauge section of Rutland to the Holden town line, a 1.1-mile (1.8 km) stone-dust section is complete and open. The easternmost 0.1 miles (0.16 km) remains unimproved.
  - Between the Rutland–Holden town line and Princeton Street (east of the Providence and Worcester Railroad crossing), the historic right-of-way has been lost to private development, requiring an on-road detour.
- MCRT: Holden and West Boylston: From Princeton Street in Holden to Thomas Street in the village of Oakdale in West Boylston, an 8.6-mile (13.8 km) contiguous route is complete and open. In Holden, the trail runs from Princeton Street to Mill Street, where users follow a 0.5-mile (0.80 km) on-road connection along Mill Street to River Street. The route continues from Mill Street to Manning Street, using a series of trail switchbacks along the Wachusett Aqueduct, and opened in 2025. The trail continues on Manning Street to River Street. From River Street to Thomas Street in Oakdale, a section roughly follows the Quinapoxet River, passing beneath Interstate 190 and crossing two bridges over the river. Opened in October 1997, the West Boylston segment was the first to officially bear the Mass Central Rail Trail name. The trail in Holden is owned and maintained by the DCR, while the trail in West Boylston is owned and managed by the Town of West Boylston in partnership with Wachusett Greenways.

East of Thomas Street, the historic rail corridor entered the footprint of the Wachusett Reservoir, leaving a gap through Sterling to Route 140 where the Wachusett Dam and Clinton Greenway section begins.

==== Wachusett Greenways connecting trails ====
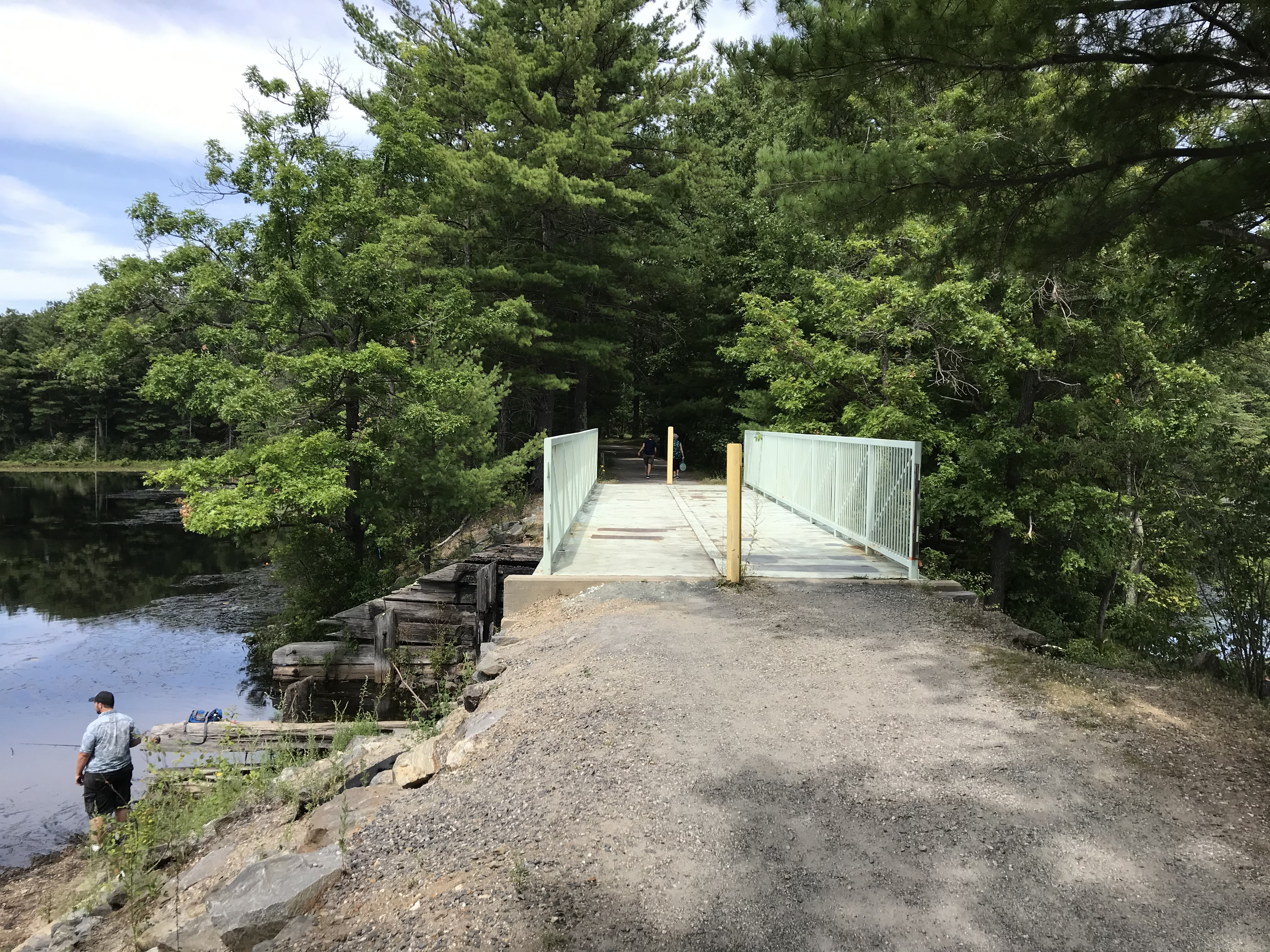
Sterling Spur MCRT bridge between West Lake Waushacum and The Quag in 2021. It was replaced by a prefabricated steel bridge in 2022.

- Sterling Spur of the Mass Central Rail Trail: A 1.7-mile (2.7 km) stone-dust trail from Gates Road to Waushacum Avenue in Sterling. North of the main MCRT corridor, it uses the former right-of-way of the Fitchburg and Worcester Railroad, so it is not included in the 104-mile (167 km) MCRT tally. When the rail line opened in 1850, its causeway across West Waushacum Lake physically created "The Quag", and the corridor historically served the Sterling Cider Mill and Waushacum Park. Today, the trail is owned by the DCR and maintained by Wachusett Greenways.
- Ware River Rail Trail: This 15-mile (24 km) trail follows the ROW of the former Ware River Railroad, and is available by an on-road connection, roughly following the Burnshirt River. The southern terminus is on Route 122, 0.25 miles (0.40 km) from the beginning of the Wachusett Greenways section at the Ware River.
- Midstate Hiking Trail: There is a connection in Rutland to this 92-mile (148 km) scenic footpath, between the two crossings of Whitehall Road.
- Ware River Watershed trails: Several local footpaths and DCR watershed trails connect directly to the MCRT corridor in Rutland and Oakham.
- Wachusett Reservoir Watershed trails: Several local footpaths and DCR watershed trails connect directly to the MCRT corridor in Holden.

=== Wachusett Dam and Clinton Greenway ===
MCRT Wachusett Dam and Clinton Greenway segments (west to east)
Segment	Endpoints	Municipality	Length	Surface	Status	Year opened
MCRT Wachusett Dam Hike: Railroad Corridor	DCR Gate 39 (West Boylston Street, Route 110) to Wachusett Dam viaduct abutment	Clinton	1.2 miles (1.9 km)	Stone dust	Complete	—
MCRT Wachusett Dam Hike: Spillway Path	Wachusett Dam viaduct abutment to River Road (Dam Fountain)	Clinton	0.3 miles (0.48 km)	Gravel	Open, unimproved	—
DCR River Road	River Road (Dam Fountain) to DCR Gate 43 (Boylston Street, Route 62)	Clinton	0.5 miles (0.80 km)	Asphalt	Complete	—
Gap	DCR Gate 43 (Boylston Street, Route 62) to Clinton Tunnel western portal	Clinton	—	N/A	Unimproved	—
MCRT: Clinton Tunnel	Boylston Street, Route 62 (Tunnel western portal) to MCRT: Clinton Greenway (Tunnel eastern portal)	Clinton	1,100 feet (340 m)	Dirt / ballast	In design	—
MCRT: Clinton Greenway	Clinton Tunnel eastern portal to Clinton–Berlin town line	Clinton	0.9 miles (1.4 km)	Planned stone dust	Under construction	—

The Wachusett Reservoir section of the MCRT in Clinton is DCR property, also known as the Wachusett Dam Hike, and is open to pedestrians and bicyclists:

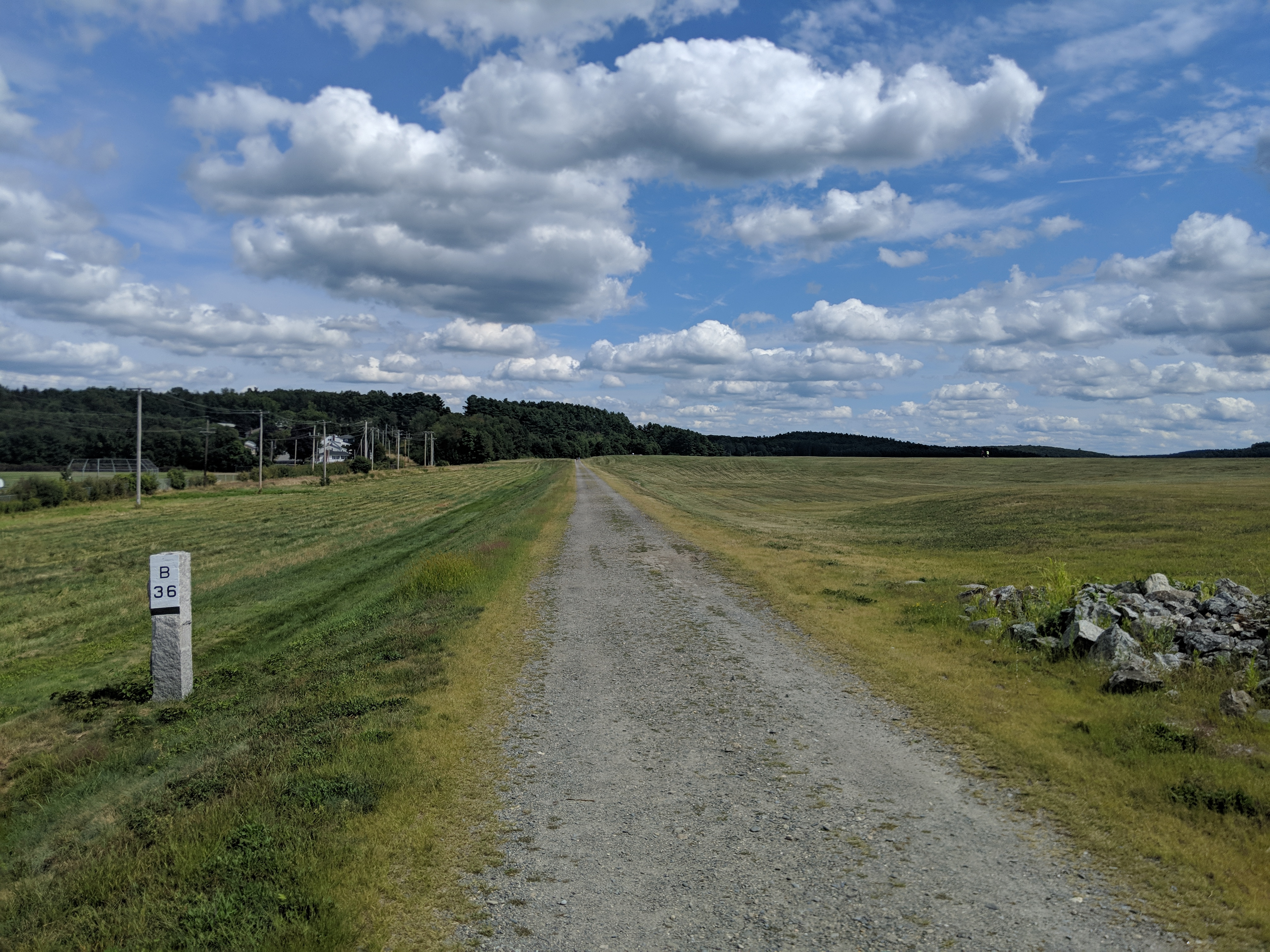
Boston 36 miles (58 km) marker on Wachusett Dam Hike, Clinton

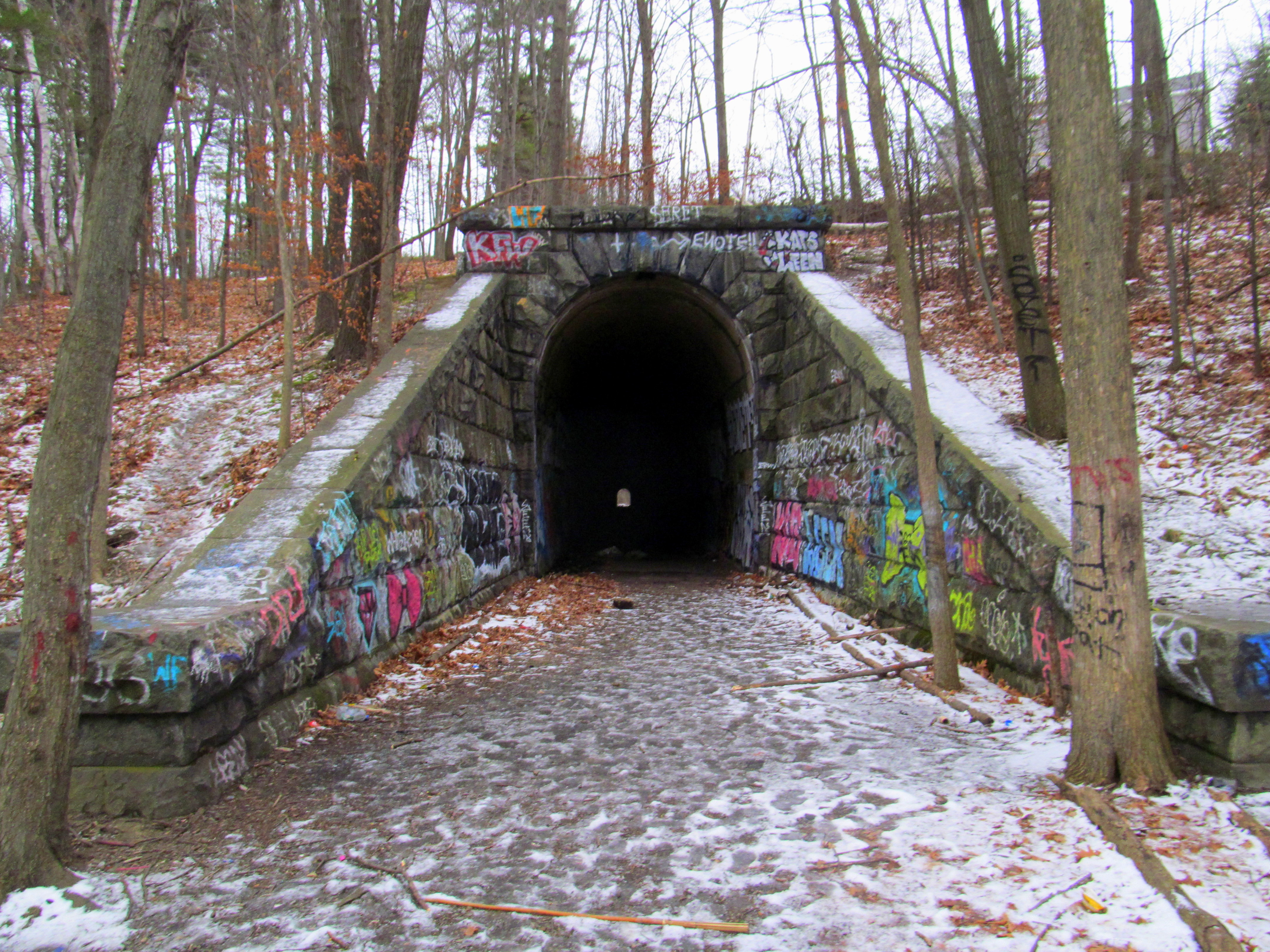
Clinton Train Tunnel, unimproved

- MCRT Wachusett Dam Hike: Railroad Corridor: From West Boylston Street (Route 110) at South Meadow Road, the trail follows 1.2 miles (1.9 km) of the historic Central Massachusetts Railroad corridor along the northern edge of the Wachusett Reservoir to the western abutment of the former 917-foot (280 m) Clinton Viaduct over the reservoir, which was demolished by the Metropolitan District Commission in 1974.
- MCRT Wachusett Dam Hike: Spillway Path: Because the former railroad viaduct is gone and the top of the Wachusett Dam itself is only open to public use two days a year, a 0.3-mile (0.48 km) trail follows an inclined gravel path down to the base of the dam along the spillway channel to the South Nashua River bridge.
- DCR River Road: East of the South Nashua River, DCR's asphalt paved River Road, closed to public motor vehicles but open to pedestrians and bicyclists, continues 0.5 miles (0.80 km) and completes the Wachusett Dam Hike at the yellow DCR gate numbered 43 at Boylston Street (Route 62) and Cameron Street.

There is a gap along Boylston Street (Route 62).

The town of Clinton, and the Clinton Greenway Conservation Trust, a 501(c)(3) nonprofit, are collaborating on improving two sections:

- MCRT: Clinton Tunnel: The Clinton Greenway Conservation Trust helped to acquire the ROW in Clinton from the Boston & Maine Railroad, including the 1,100-foot (340 m) Clinton Tunnel, which remains unimproved while engineering and design work proceed.
- MCRT: Clinton Greenway: East of the Clinton Tunnel to the Berlin town line, the rail ROW acquired with the assistance of the Clinton Greenway Conservation Trust began construction in 2026 to convert 0.9 miles (1.4 km) of the corridor into an improved shared-use path. The trail will connect two Town owned parcels, the Maffei Conservation Area and the Rauscher Farm, and pass through the open space around the Woodlands Development.

=== Berlin Rail Trail ===
In Berlin the rail ROW is unimproved. It is partially owned by the Town of Berlin, CSX Transportation, and the MBTA. An advocacy group, Berlin Trail Trust, is working to build the Mass Central Rail Trail in Berlin. The trust has proposed a three-phase development plan: Phase 1 covers the DCR's Mass Central Rail Trail—Wayside corridor in eastern Berlin, while Phases 2 and 3 encompass the central and western Berlin segments, respectively. In 2024, the town received a MassTrails grant to conduct a trail feasibility study across all three Berlin phases.

==== Berlin connecting trails ====
A connection to the existing Lester G. Ross Dam, Wachusett Aqueduct Trail, and proposed Boston Worcester Air Line Trail (BWALT) will occur with Phase 2 in Berlin.

=== Mass Central Rail Trail—Wayside ===
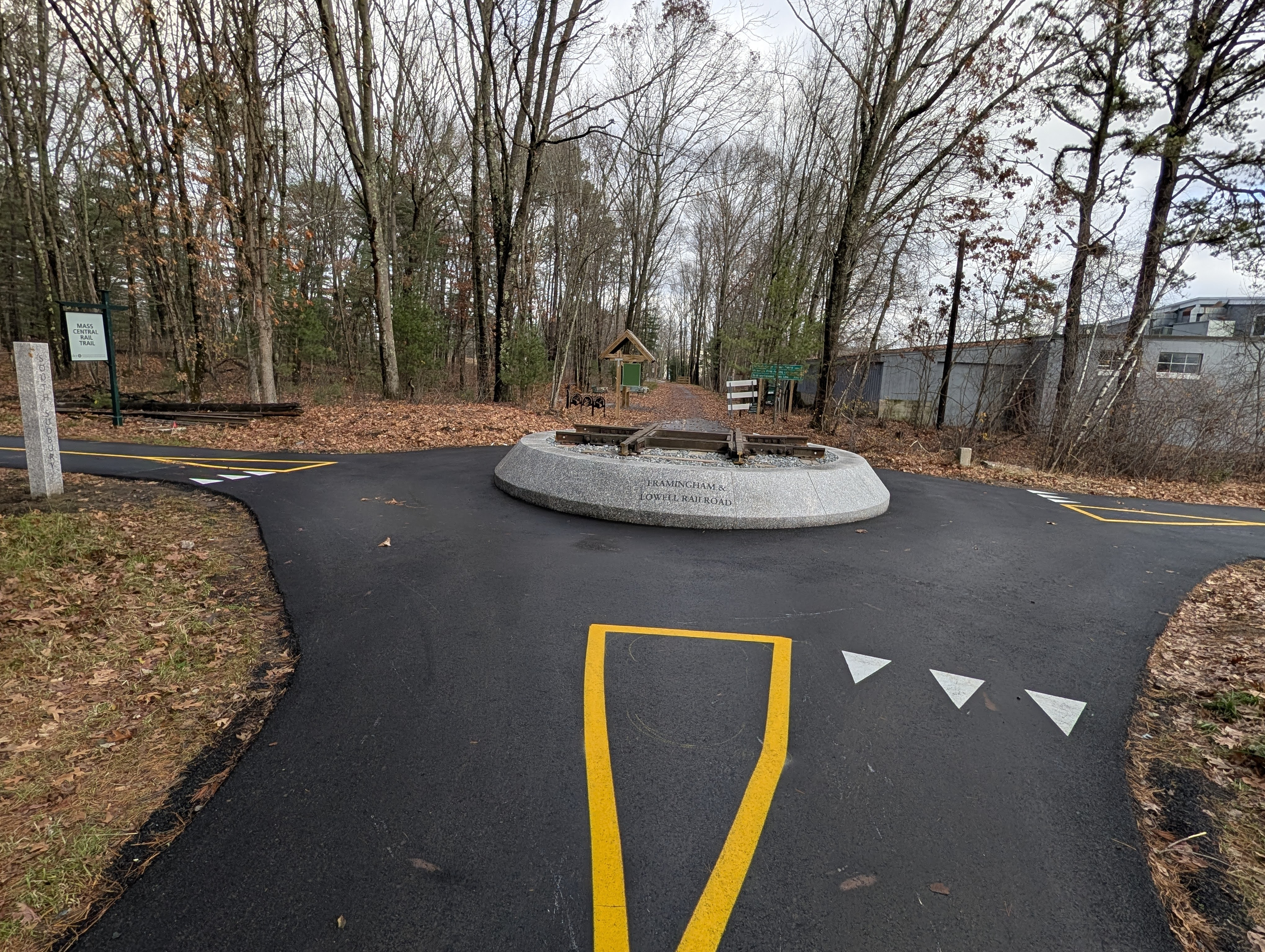
MCRT—Wayside and Bruce Freeman Rail Trail roundabout with railroad diamond monument

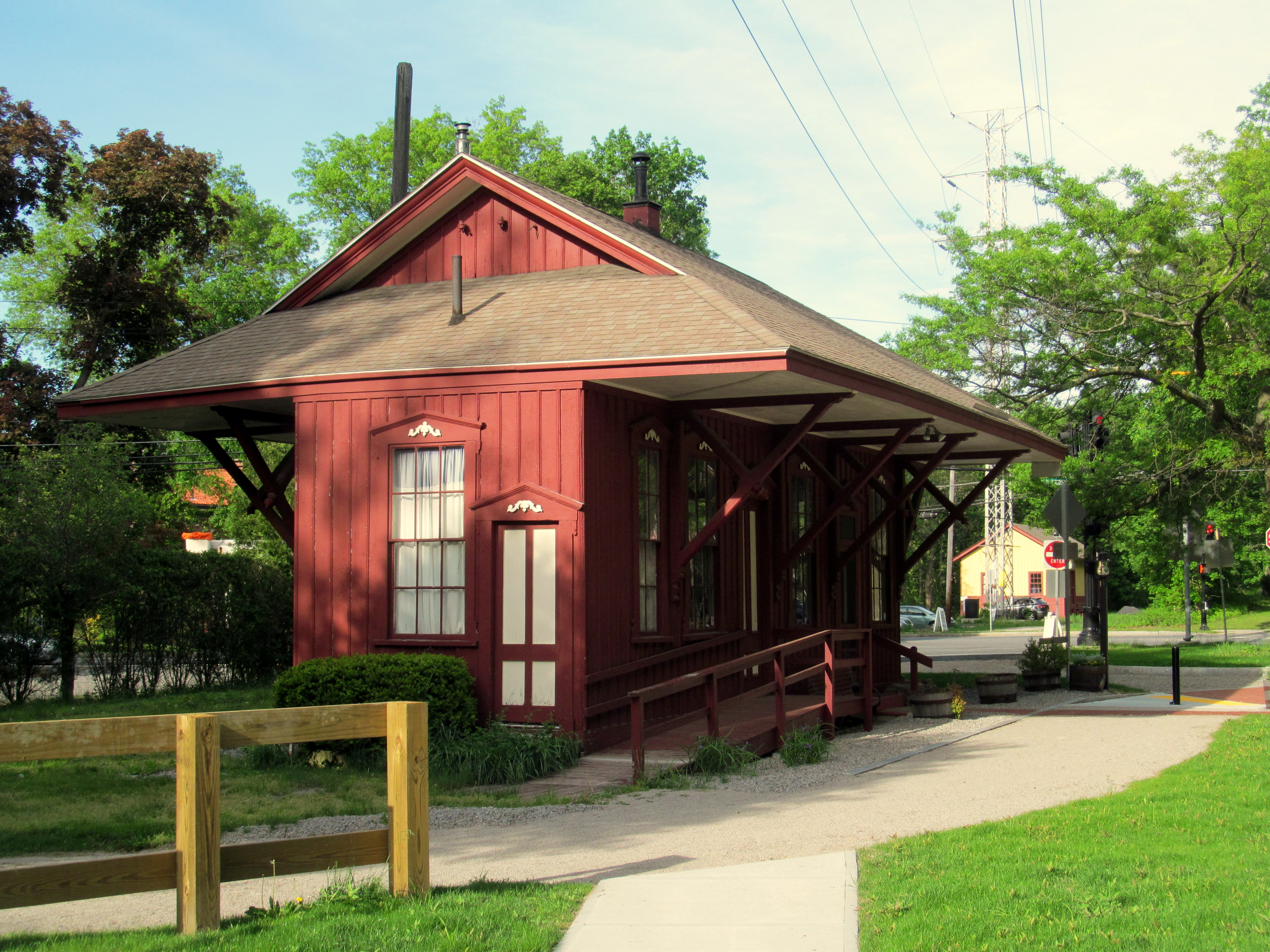
The MCRT—Wayside passes Wayland station

The Mass Central Rail Trail—Wayside (MCRT—Wayside) is a partially completed, 23-mile (37 km) rail trail in Berlin, Bolton, Hudson, Stow, Marlborough, Sudbury, Wayland, Weston, and Waltham. The trail is a Department of Conservation and Recreation (DCR) state park along the right-of-way (ROW) of the former Massachusetts Central Railroad and later, former MBTA Central Mass Branch. It currently has 16 miles (26 km) open, and the remaining miles are in design. In 2010, DCR signed a 99-year lease with the MBTA for trail development. All completed sections of the MCRT—Wayside are asphalt paved. DCR plans to pave both all sections under construction, and the only section that is currently stone dust in Wayland.

MCRT—Wayside segments (west to east)
Segment endpoints	Municipality	Length	Surface	Status	Year opened
Coburn Road to Central Street	Berlin, Bolton, Hudson	2.3 miles (3.7 km)	Unimproved	In Design	—
Central Street to Felton Street	Hudson	1.6 miles (2.6 km)	Unimproved	In Design	—
Felton Street to Priest Street	Hudson	1.0 mile (1.6 km)	Unimproved	In Design	—
Priest Street to Wilkins Street (Shared with Assabet River Rail Trail)	Hudson	0.75 miles (1.21 km)	Asphalt	Complete	2005
Wilkins Street to Sudbury substation	Hudson, Stow, Marlborough, Sudbury	7.6 miles (12.2 km)	Asphalt	Complete	2026
Sudbury substation to Route 20	Sudbury, Wayland	1.4 miles (2.3 km)	Unimproved	In Design	—
Route 20 to Cochituate Road	Wayland	0.5 miles (0.80 km)	Stone dust	Complete (asphalt in design)	2017
Cochituate Road to Stony Brook Bridge	Wayland, Weston	4.4 miles (7.1 km)	Asphalt	Complete	2019
Stony Brook Bridge to Jones Road	Weston, Waltham	0.3 miles (0.48 km)	Asphalt	Complete	2025
Jones Road to Hillside Road	Waltham	0.5 miles (0.80 km)	Unimproved	In Design	—
Hillside Road to Border Road	Waltham	0.3 miles (0.48 km)	Asphalt	Complete	2014
Border Road to Beaver Street (Except Linden Street Bridge)	Waltham	2.75 miles (4.43 km)	Asphalt	Complete	2023
↳ Linden Street Bridge	Waltham	0.02 miles (0.032 km)	Asphalt	Complete	2025

At the western end of the corridor, 4.9 miles (7.9 km) of unimproved right-of-way from Coburn Road in Berlin through Bolton to Priest Street in Hudson are in design. In Hudson, the MCRT—Wayside shares a 0.75-mile (1.21 km) paved alignment with the Assabet River Rail Trail between Priest Street and Wilkins Street. East of Wilkins Street, a continuous 7.6-mile (12.2 km) paved trail runs through Hudson, Stow, Marlborough, and Sudbury to the Sudbury substation; this segment was built through a partnership between DCR and Eversource alongside an underground electric transmission line project and opened in 2026.

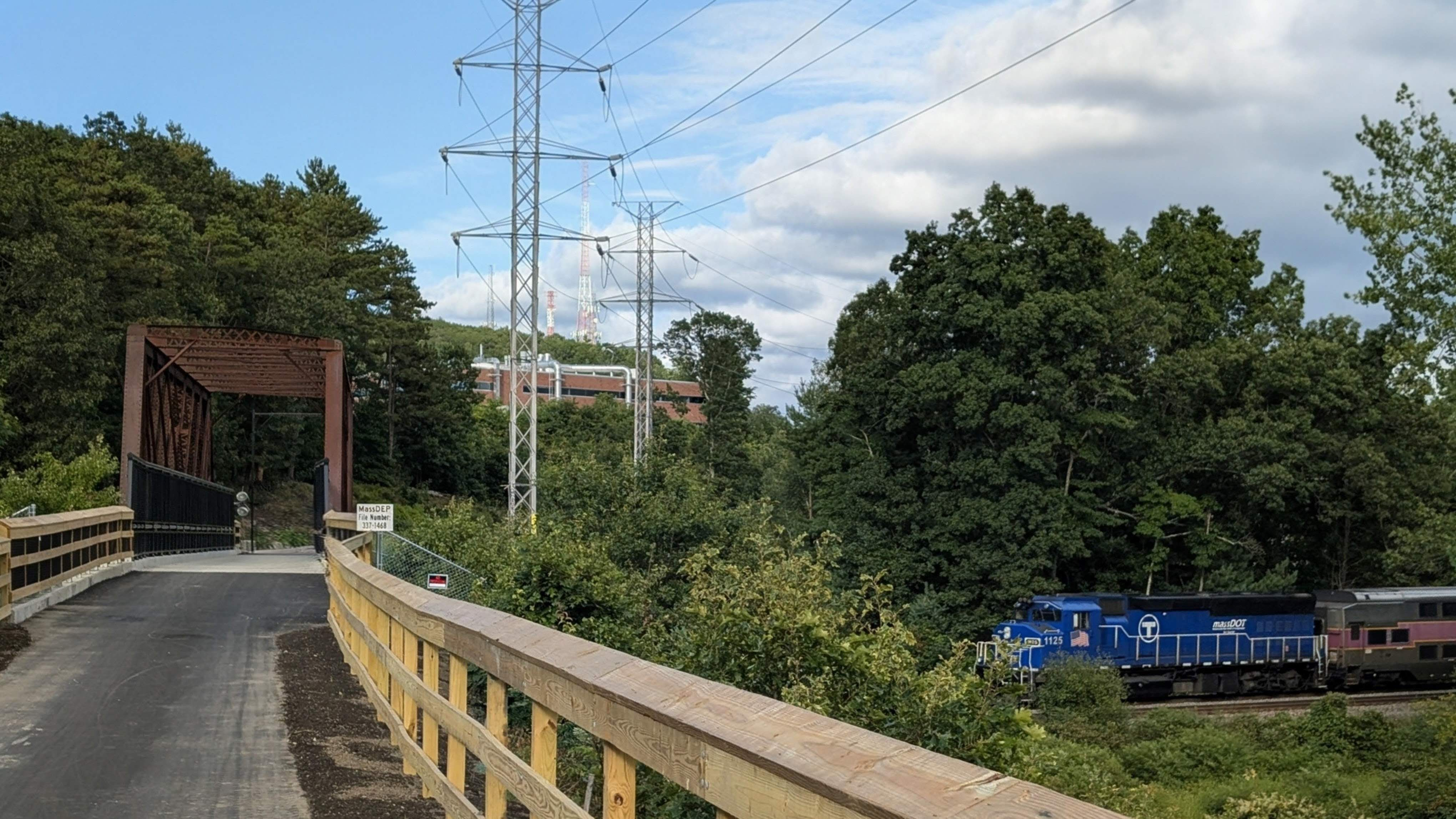
Stony Brook Bridge, a lattice truss bridge over the Fitchburg Line in Weston

Following a 1.4-mile (2.3 km) unimproved gap in design between the Sudbury substation and Route 20, a continuous 5.2-mile (8.4 km) completed trail runs from Route 20 through Wayland and Weston across the Stony Brook Bridge to Jones Road in Waltham. After a 0.5-mile (0.80 km) gap in design between Jones Road and Hillside Road, the easternmost 3.1 miles (5.0 km) through Waltham from Hillside Road to Beaver Street are paved and complete, including the restored 1894 Linden Street Bridge over the Fitchburg Line.

==== MCRT—Wayside connecting trails ====
In Hudson, the MCRT—Wayside connects with the Assabet River Rail Trail and the Marlborough-Sudbury State Forest/Goodale Lot hiking trails. In Sudbury, it connects with the Bruce Freeman Rail Trail Phase 2D, at the site of the Sudbury diamond. There are also many connections to hiking trails including the Assabet River National Wildlife Refuge, the City of Marlborough Desert Natural Area, the Town of Sudbury Hop Brook Marsh Conservation Land, and Sudbury Valley Trustees Memorial Forest. In Wayland, a portion of the trail is shared with the Bay Circuit Trail and the East Coast Greenway. In Weston, there are many connections to hiking trails including Jericho Town Forest and Sears Conservation Land. In Waltham, there is a connection to the hiking trails in Prospect Hill Park. The Western Greenway to MCRT connection received a 2023 MassTrails grant for design and permitting.

=== Greater Boston paths, parks, and bridges ===
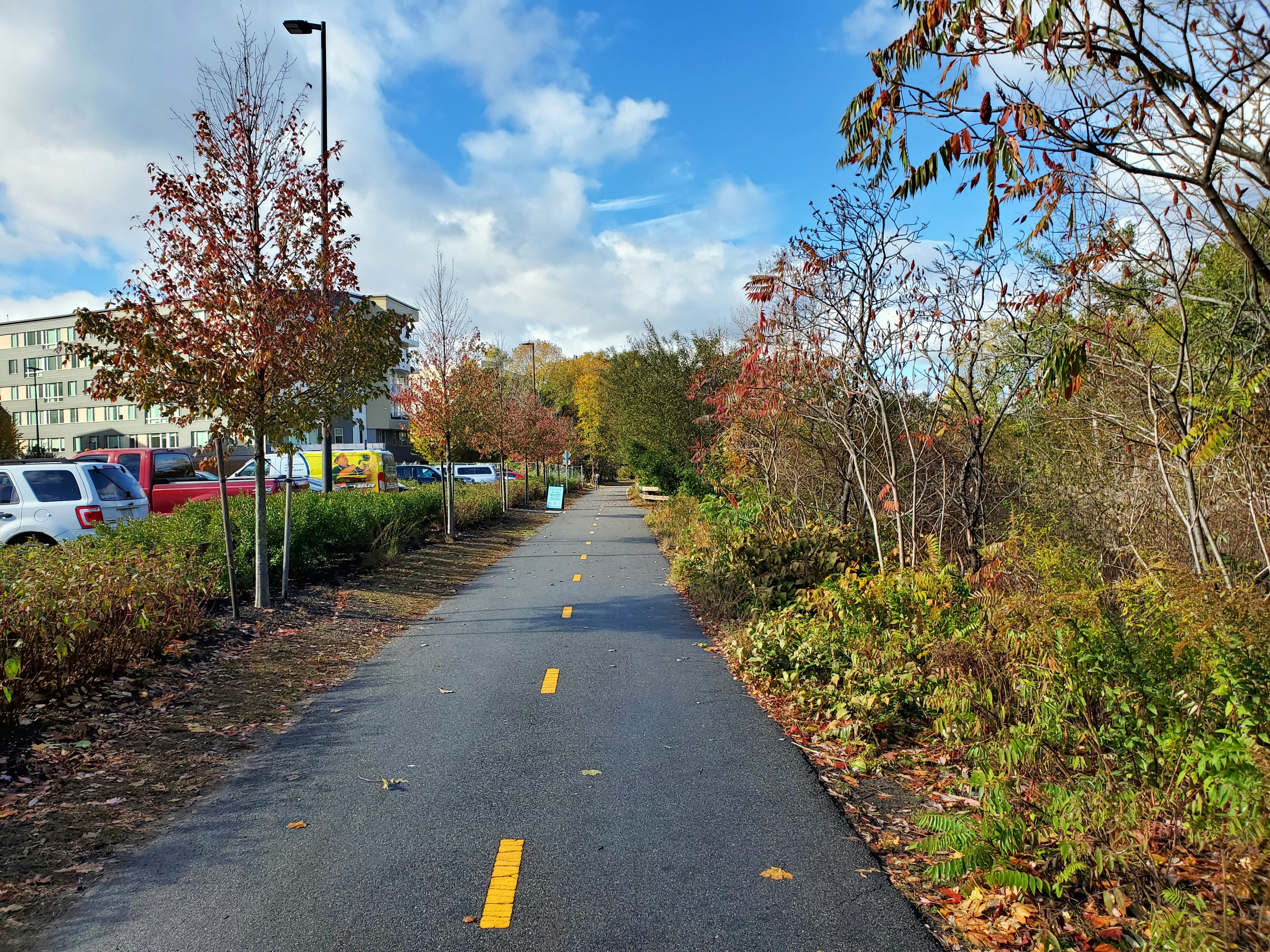
Fitchburg Cutoff Path, Cambridge

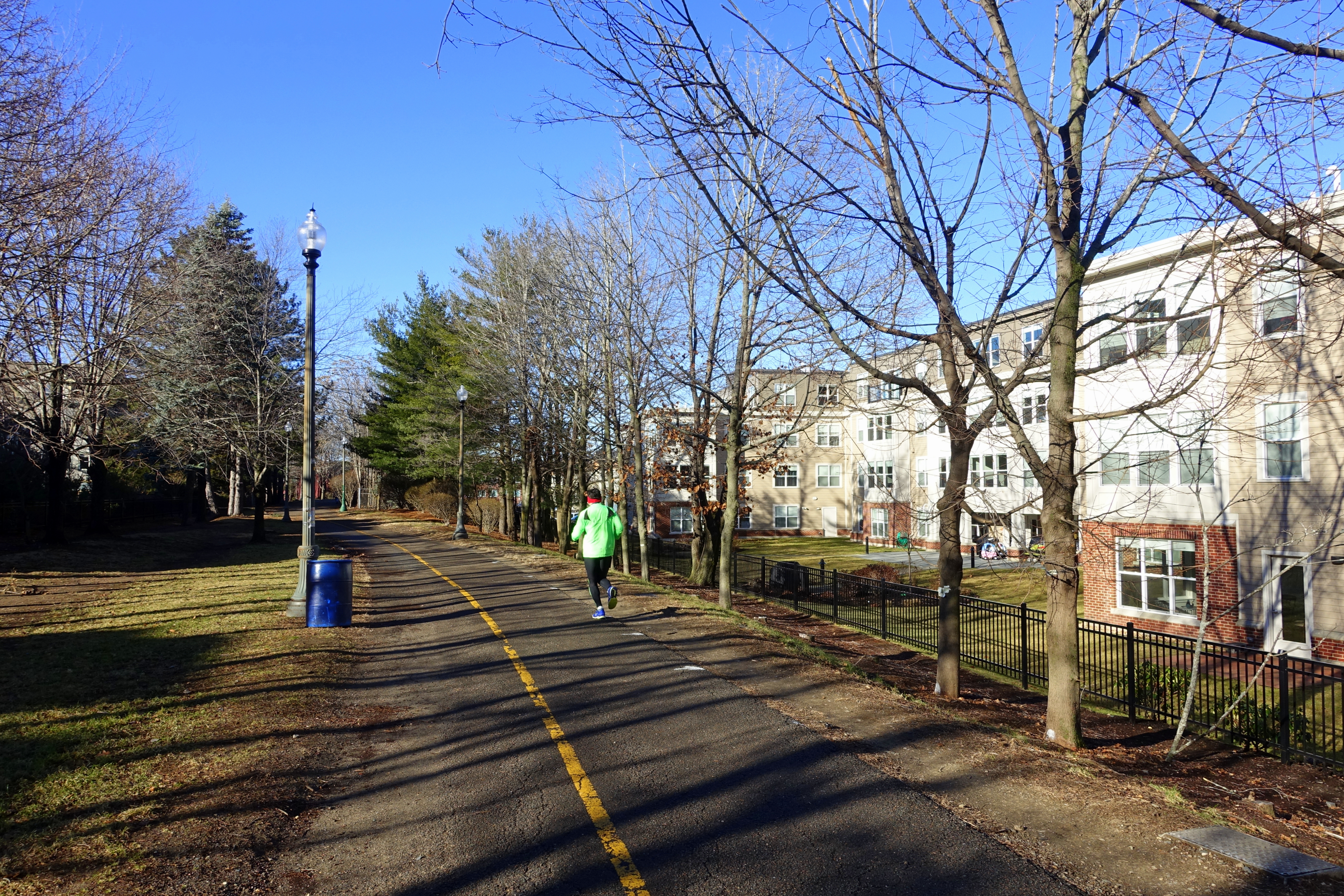
Linear Park, Cambridge

Across eastern Waltham, Belmont, Cambridge, Somerville, and Boston, the Mass Central Rail Trail consists of interconnected municipal and regional paths, parks, and bridges built in phases. All completed sections are asphalt paved. The segment in Waltham east of Beaver Street and the Belmont Community Path was originally included in the 1997 Central Massachusetts Rail Trail Feasibility Study and the former Wayside Rail Trail proposal, but are now managed separately from the DCR's Mass Central Rail Trail—Wayside project.

MCRT segments in Greater Boston (west to east)
Segment	Endpoints	Municipality	Length	Surface	Status	Year opened
East Waltham	Beaver Street to Waltham–Belmont town line	Waltham	0.72 miles (1.16 km)	Unimproved	Unimproved	—
Belmont Community Path (Phase 2)	Waltham–Belmont town line to Clark Street	Belmont	1.0 mile (1.6 km)	Planned asphalt	In design	—
Belmont Community Path (Phase 1)	Clark Street to Brighton Street	Belmont	1.1 miles (1.8 km)	Planned asphalt	In design (funded)	—
Fitchburg Cutoff Path	Brighton Street to Alewife station Access Road	Belmont, Cambridge	0.8 miles (1.3 km)	Asphalt	Complete	2013
Minuteman/Linear Park Connector	Alewife station Access Road to Russell Field	Cambridge	0.3 miles (0.48 km)	Asphalt	Complete	2013
Linear Park	Russell Field to Cambridge–Somerville border	Cambridge	0.7 miles (1.1 km)	Asphalt	Under reconstruction	1985
Somerville Community Path	Cambridge–Somerville border to North First Street	Somerville, Cambridge	3.2 miles (5.1 km)	Asphalt	Complete	1994–2023
Cambridge Crossing	North First Street to Richard McKinnon State Park	Cambridge	0.2 miles (0.32 km)	Asphalt	Complete	2023
Richard McKinnon State Park and shared use path	Cambridge Crossing to North Bank Bridge	Cambridge, Boston	0.3 miles (0.48 km)	Asphalt	Complete	2007
North Bank Bridge	Richard McKinnon State Park to Paul Revere Park	Cambridge, Boston	0.2 miles (0.32 km)	Asphalt	Complete	2012
Paul Revere Park	North Bank Bridge to Bill Russell Bridge / Gridley Locks Foothpath	Boston	0.2 miles (0.32 km)	Asphalt	Complete	1999
Bill Russell Bridge (Option - protected bike lanes and sidewalk)	Paul Revere Park to North Station	Boston	0.3 miles (0.48 km)	Asphalt	Complete	2025
Gridley Locks Footpath (Option - pedestrian only)	Paul Revere Park to North Station	Boston	0.2 miles (0.32 km)	Asphalt	Complete	1978

==== Waltham and Belmont ====
In eastern Waltham, the 0.72-mile (1.16 km) corridor between Beaver Street and the Waltham–Belmont town line remains unimproved. A 2012 Metropolitan Area Planning Council (MAPC) study evaluated alignment options for this segment, and in 2018 the City of Waltham considered incorporating it into its MCRT—Wayside construction project. No construction timeline has been established, though a 2025 oil spill remediation project addressed a long-standing environmental impediment along the corridor.

East of the town line, the Belmont Community Path is planned in two phases as a rails with trails corridor parallel to the MBTA Fitchburg Line. Phase 2, spanning 1 mile (1.6 km) from the Waltham–Belmont town line to Clark Street, is in design but has not yet secured construction funding, with construction tentatively projected for 2026–2027 subject to Transportation Improvement Program (TIP) approval. Phase 1, covering 1.1 miles (1.8 km) from Clark Street to Brighton Street, has been in development for over two decades, supported by a 2008 land acquisition by the nonprofit Belmont Citizens Forum and a 2024 MassTrails right-of-way grant. Phase 1 has completed design and received a TIP construction funding commitment from the Boston Region Metropolitan Planning Organization, with construction scheduled to begin in 2026. The Phase 1 design includes an underpass beneath the Fitchburg Line tracks linking Belmont High School to Alexander Avenue, a safety crossing first proposed in 1983 following a student fatality.

==== Cambridge, Somerville, and Boston ====
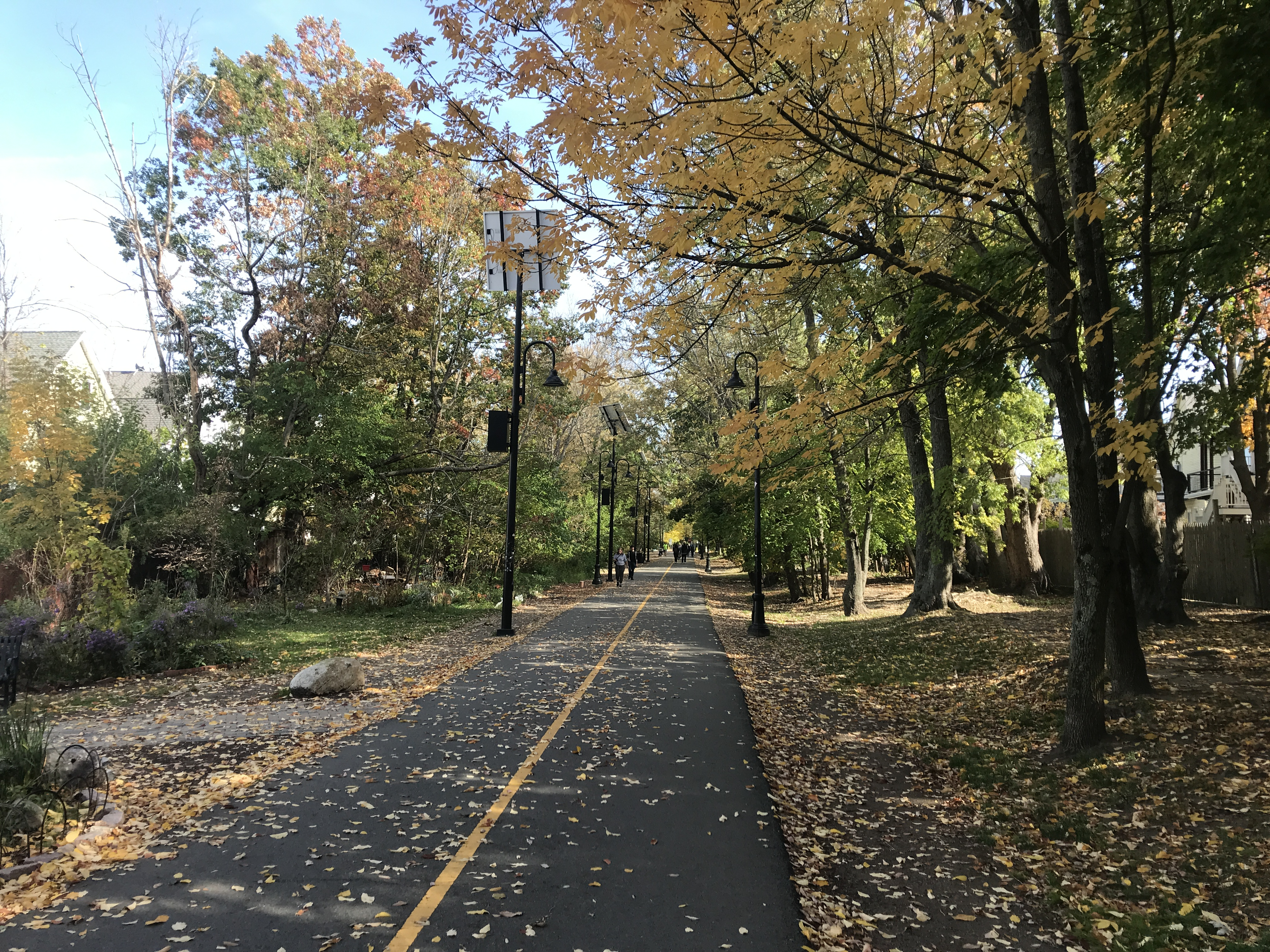
Somerville Community Path, Somerville

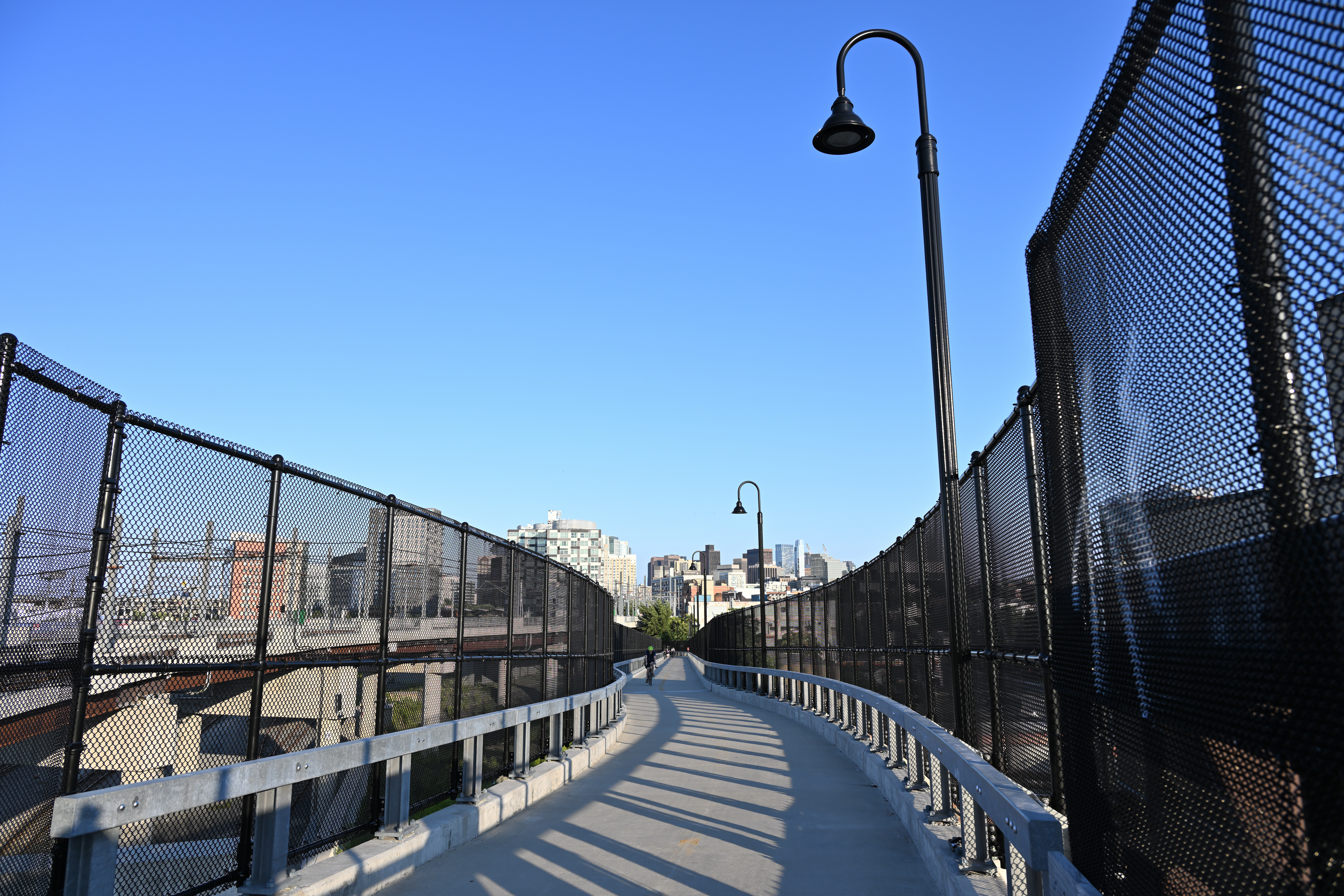
Somerville Community Path Extension viaduct, over GLX and Lowell Line tracks

From Brighton Street in Belmont, the 0.8-mile (1.3 km) Fitchburg Cutoff Path (opened in 2013) carries the trail east to the Alewife station Access Road in Cambridge. From there, the 0.3-mile (0.48 km) Minuteman/Linear Park Connector runs along Yates Pond via a cantilevered boardwalk, passes east of the main Alewife station headhouse, and continues between Jerry's Pond and the Russell Field station entrance; its bridge and widened path were built as part of Cambridge's Belmont–Cambridge–Somerville Path project.

East of Russell Field, the 0.7-mile (1.1 km) Linear Park (originally opened in 1985) extends to the brick-marked Cambridge–Somerville border. In 2021, the City of Cambridge initiated a redesign to widen and repave the path to modern shared-use standards, add secondary walkways, and plant over 100 trees. Reconstruction began in August 2025, paused briefly under a temporary restraining order filed by residents concerned about impacts to mature trees, and resumed in October 2025 after a judge denied a preliminary injunction.

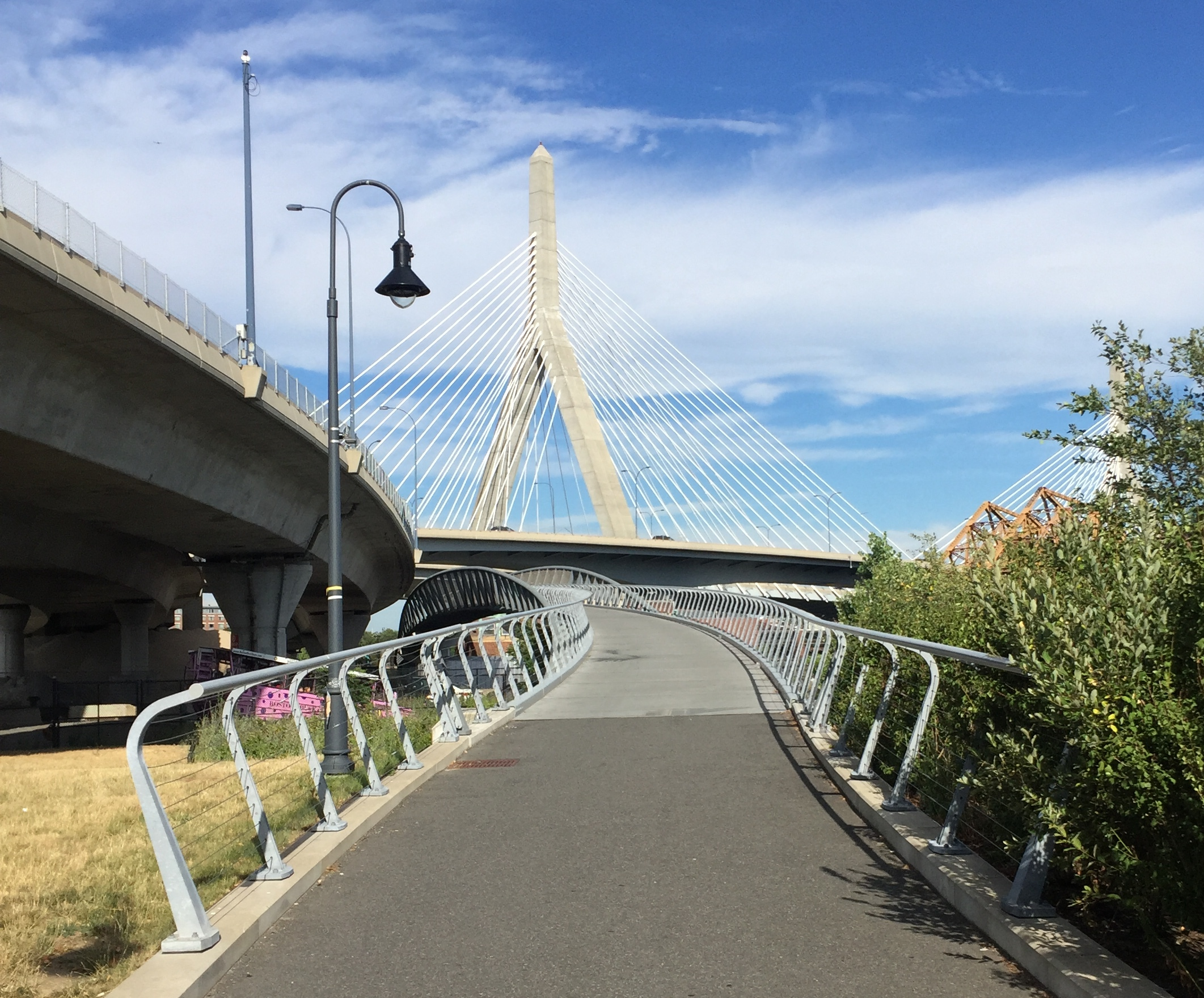
The western end of the North Bank Bridge with Zakim Bridge in background, Cambridge

From the Cambridge–Somerville border to North First Street in Cambridge, the trail follows the 3.2-mile (5.1 km) Somerville Community Path. Its western sections opened in stages between 1994 and 2015, while the eastern Somerville Community Path Extension opened in 2023 alongside the Green Line Extension (GLX), featuring a 1,400-foot (430 m), 50-foot (15 m)-high viaduct over the Fitchburg Line and GLX tracks.

The final 0.9 miles (1.4 km) from North First Street to the Charles River Dam in Charlestown runs through the Cambridge Crossing development, Richard McKinnon State Park, the North Bank Bridge (opened in 2012), and Paul Revere Park. Trail advocates sought to include a more direct pedestrian and bicycle bridge to North Station as part of the MBTA's Draw One rail bridge replacement project, but the walkway component was eliminated from the project design. Instead, non-motorized connections across the Charles River to North Station are provided by the protected bike lanes and sidewalks on the adjacent Bill Russell Bridge, or the pedestrian-only Gridley Locks Footpath over the Charles River Dam.

==== Greater Boston connecting trails ====
Alewife Station is a trail hub, connecting with the Minuteman Bikeway, as well as the Alewife Brook Greenway and the greater Mystic Greenways network. Sequential connections heading south include the Alewife Brook Parkway Path, the Fresh Pond Bikeway, the Watertown-Cambridge Greenway, the Watertown Branch Rail Trail, and the Charles River Bike Path. In Somerville, the MCRT will link to the proposed Mystic to Charles Connector if built, and in turn, when the Mystic River Bicycle/Pedestrian bridge is built, will link to the Northern Strand Community Trail. East of Cambridge Crossing and into Boston, the MCRT is shared with the East Coast Greenway. The entire Mass Central Rail trail is part of the New England Rail-Trail Network, which continues north from Boston via the Border to Boston Trail which is part of the East Coast Greenway. In Boston, the Charles River Bike Path is accessible by bike lanes across Charles River Dam Road. The Boston Harborwalk includes the Charles River Dam.

== History ==
The Massachusetts Central Railroad was formed in 1869 and envisioned a 104-mile (167 km) railroad from Boston to Northampton. By the summer of 1872 work had commenced at 30 locations from Weston to Northampton, however the Panic of 1873 halted construction. Work laying rails resumed again in 1880, and by the end of 1881, there was passenger service from Boston 48 miles (77 km) to Jefferson. In 1883, the selling agent for the company's bonds, Charles A. Sweet and Co., declared bankruptcy, and operations ceased. The Massachusetts Central Railroad was succeeded by the Central Massachusetts Railroad, which was leased by the Boston and Maine Railroad in 1887, naming it the Central Massachusetts Branch. Later that year, the route was completed from Boston to Northampton. The railroad faced various challenges over its history, including a fatal blow to the complete route by the Hurricane of 1938 which severed the middle 24 miles (39 km) from Oakdale to Wheelwright. This reduced the Central Mass Branch to the eastern side and created the Wheelwright Branch to the west, and over time both branches continued to reduce service. In 1964, the Massachusetts Bay Transportation Authority (MBTA) was created, partly to subsidize struggling commuter rail routes including the Central Mass Branch. However, ridership continued to decline and the MBTA closed the Central Mass Branch in 1971, although freight rail continued for a few more years.

The first attempt to convert the former Central Massachusetts Railroad into a rail trail occurred in 1980 when the Commonwealth of Massachusetts acquired the westernmost 8.5 miles (13.7 km) of the Wheelwright Branch, and developed it into what was then known as the Norwottuck Rail Trail in 1993. In 1995, community leaders and volunteers formed the Wachusett Greenways, a 501(c)(3) nonprofit formed to create trails and greenways in the communities between Barre and Sterling, and began to build a hard packed stone dust trail over the rail ROW, naming it the Massachusetts Central Rail Trail to promote the idea of a state-wide trail network. In 1997, the first plans to build out the MCRT from Berlin to Belmont on the MBTA's ROW emerged, but stalled until 2010, when the Massachusetts Department of Conservation and Recreation (DCR) executed a lease with the MBTA to build the Mass Central Rail Trail—Wayside from Berlin to Waltham. This work inspired other communities and land trusts to begin to build out their own sections of the MCRT.

=== Belchertown history ===
By 1983, the Boston and Maine Railroad had taken up all tracks of the Wheelwright Branch in Belchertown. In 1997, Belchertown held an unofficial straw poll against further study of the trail. At that time, Massachusetts was the only state that required paving of trails if using federal funds, which was cited as a concern. Over the following years, the Massachusetts Department of Transportation generated updated guidelines allowing for non-paved surfaces on shared use paths and greenways. Other sections of the MCRT were built with a hard packed stone dust surface, such as the Wachussett Greenways sections. From 2000 to 2017, the Belchertown Land Trust, a 501(c)(3) nonprofit, purchased 6.8 miles (10.9 km) (72%) of the former ROW land as it became available and donated it to the Town of Belchertown for public use and to protect from development. In 2017 the Friends of the Belchertown Greenway was formed with the goal of building and maintaining the trail. In 2025, Belchertown officially endorsed the completion of the entire Mass Central Rail Trail.

== Completion efforts and advocacy ==
In 1999, the Massachusetts Department of Environmental Management produced "Commonwealth Connections, A Greenway Vision for Massachusetts", including a call for a cross state multi-use trail reaching from Boston to the Berkshires. Since 1999, Wachusett Greenways, the Wayside Rail Trail Committee, or the Mass Central Rail Trail Alliance, previously named the Norwottuck Network, have held Golden Spike conferences during various years to promote the MCRT and other regional trails. By 2002, every community along the corridor agreed to the unified Mass Central Rail Trail name to promote the idea of a state-wide trail. Since 2017, the Norwottuck Network has been issuing a monthly newsletter regarding MCRT development, as well as trail development in the region. In 2021, MassTrails produced "Shared Use Path Benefits Primer", which featured the Norwottuck Branch of the Mass Central Rail Trail as one of the case studies. In 2021, the Massachusetts Department of Transportation produced a feasibility study of the 68.5 miles (110.2 km) mid-state section of the MCRT between Belchertown and Berlin. In 2023, MassTrails produced an interactive Priority Trails Network vision map for current and future shared-use path projects throughout the Commonwealth that will be prioritized, including all miles of the MCRT. In 2023, the Norwottuck Network produced "Envisioning a Statewide Connection Massachusetts Central Rail Trail Benefits Study", a report highlighting the benefits of completing all miles of the MCRT.
