= MCRT =

MCRT may refer to:

- Mass Central Rail Trail
- The fictional Major Case Response Team on the television series NCIS
- Monte Carlo ray tracing, a computer graphics rendering technique more commonly known as path tracing
- MCR-T - a german Ghettotech DJ
