= North Bank Bridge =

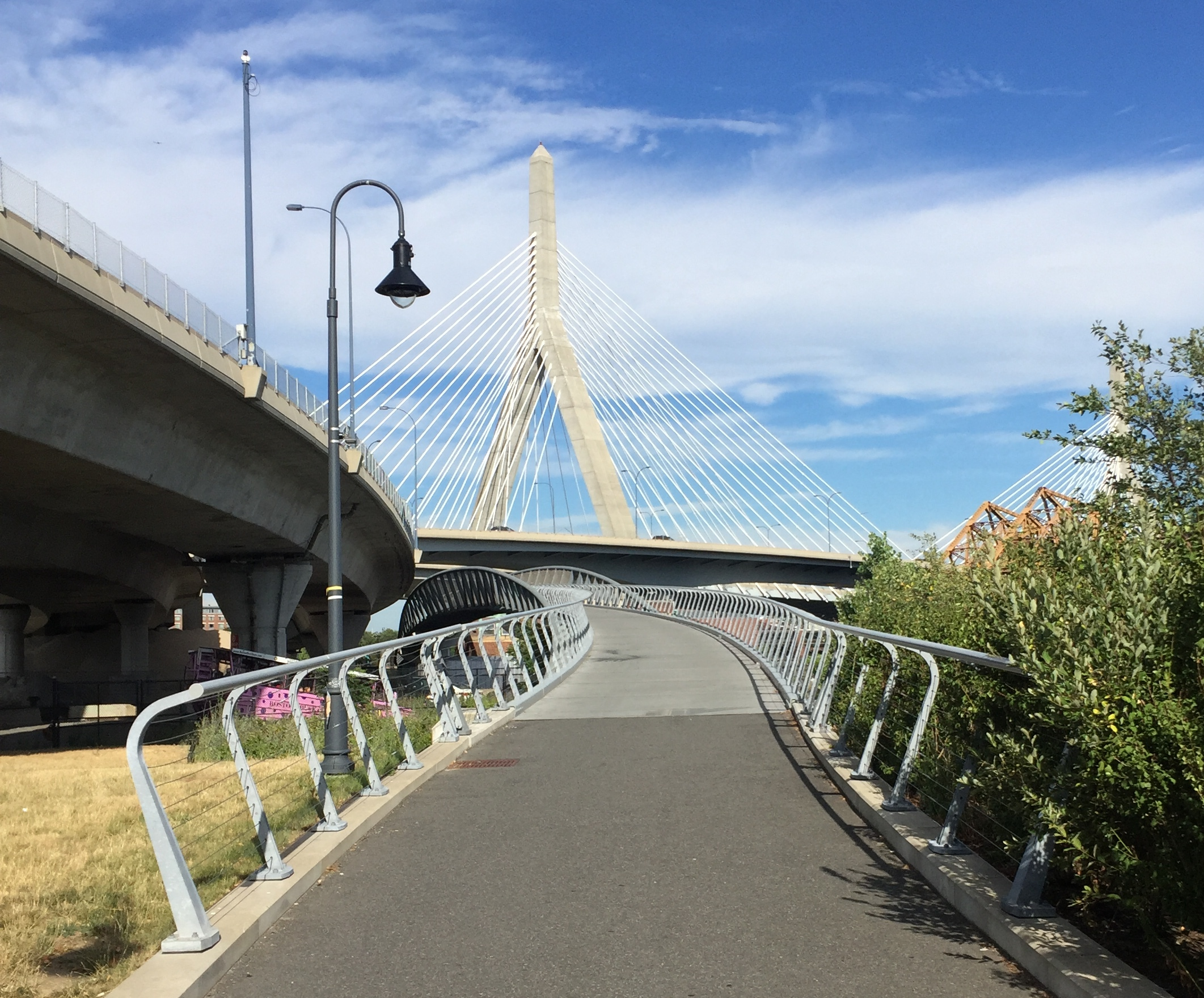
- The western end of the bridge as it enters North Point Park; the Leonard P. Zakim Bunker Hill Memorial Bridge is visible in the background (2016)
- Coordinates: 42.3696°N 71.0657°W
- Carries: Pedestrians and bicyclists
- Crosses: Millers River; MBTA Commuter Rail lead tracks to North Station
- Locale: Cambridge-Boston, Massachusetts, U.S.

History
- Constructed by: Barletta Heavy Division, Inc.
- Fabrication by: Newport Industrial Fabricators
- Opened: July 13, 2012

Location
- Interactive map of North Bank Bridge

The North Bank Bridge (sometimes North Bank Pedestrian Bridge) is a pedestrian and bicycle bridge on the north bank of the Charles River in Massachusetts. It connects North Point Park in Cambridge with Paul Revere Park in the Charlestown area of Boston, two parks which were created as mitigation efforts for Boston’s Big Dig. It is a segment of the Mass Central Rail Trail and the East Coast Greenway.

== Description ==
The bridge leaves the ground from the east side of the Cambridge portion of North Point Park (other parts of which are in the city of Boston). It crosses the MBTA Commuter Rail tracks leading into North Station, crosses the Millers River, and goes under the highway lanes of the Leverett Connector and Route 1. It lands on the east side of the Millers River under the Zakim Bridge/Interstate 93, where it connects to Paul Revere Park in Charlestown.

== History ==
The state-owned bridge opened in 2012.
