= Richard McKinnon State Park =

Park in Massachusetts, United States

Coordinates: 42°22′9.0″N 71°4′10.3″W

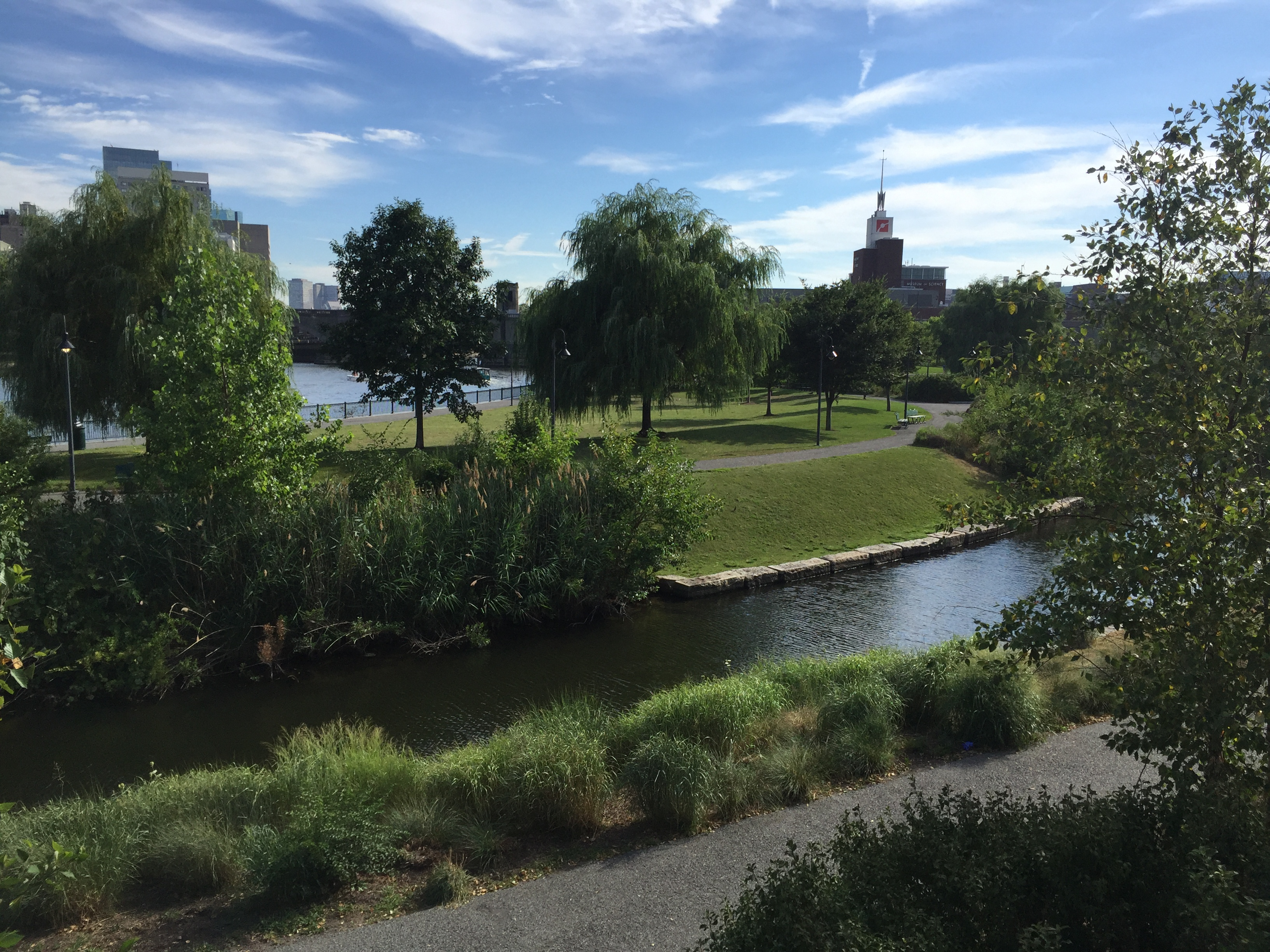
- Part of the eastern section of Richard McKinnon State Park. A canal from the Charles River separates it from other parts of the park.
- Interactive map of Richard McKinnon State Park
- Location: Boston and Cambridge, Massachusetts
- Website: www.mass.gov/locations/richard-mckinnon-park

Richard McKinnon State Park, formerly North Point Park, is an 8.5-acre (3.4 ha) park located along the left bank of the Charles River on the border of Cambridge and Boston, Massachusetts, created as mitigation for the taking of planned parkland for the construction of the Big Dig.

== Description and history ==
The state-owned park opened in December 2007 as North Point Park. The municipal boundary between Cambridge and Boston was historically approximately along the center of Charles River, but construction of the park moved the shoreline, putting part of the park in Boston.

The park is part of the "lost half mile" of the Charles River, between the 1910 Charles River Dam, now the site of the Museum of Science, and the new Charles River Dam completed in 1978. The park opening was delayed for several years by a number of logistical and bureaucratic issues, but its design, including small islands, bridges and kayaking canals, has been characterized as "grand" and "ambitious" by the local press. The park was designed by Carr Lynch & Sandell of Cambridge and Oehme, van Sweden & Associates of Washington, DC. The park is adjacent to the ongoing NorthPoint real estate development project. Just upstream of the three new parks in the half-mile (Richard McKinnon State Park, Paul Revere Park, and Nashua Street Park) is the Paul Dudley White Bike Path in the Charles River Reservation. The Lynch Family Skatepark is located in Richard McKinnon State Park under the Interstate 93 highway ramps.

In December 2025, DCR renamed North Point Park to Richard McKinnon State Park in honor of McKinnon’s decades of work that transformed the North Point area of Cambridge.

=== Pedestrian connections ===
Pedestrians and bicyclists may travel east from Richard McKinnon State Park to Paul Revere Park in Charlestown over the MBTA Commuter Rail tracks and the mouth of Miller's River via the North Bank Bridge that opened on July 13, 2012. This bridge, funded by the American Recovery and Reinvestment Act of 2009 (ARRA), allows pedestrians to traverse the north side of the Charles River basin. Pedestrian bridges are also planned over the Charles River from Richard McKinnon State Park to Nashua Street Park in Boston, and a South Bank Bridge over the MBTA Commuter Rail tracks on the south bank of the river from Nashua Street Park to the riverfront just upstream of the Zakim Bridge south tower, connecting the Charles River Reservation to Boston Harbor. A portion of the pedestrian and bicyclist path forms a segment of the Mass Central Rail Trail and the East Coast Greenway.
