= Tanner–Hiller Airport =

Tanner–Hiller Airport (Closed)
- IATA: none; ICAO: K8B5; FAA LID: 8B5

Summary
- Airport type: Public
- Operator: G&C Group
- Location: New Braintree, Massachusetts
- Closed: September 18, 2024
- Elevation AMSL: 584 ft (178 m)
- Coordinates: 42°21′23.0000″N 72°07′48.3000″W

Map
- Interactive map of Tanner–Hiller Airport (Closed)

Runways
Direction	Length		Surface
Direction	ft	m	Surface
6/24	3,027	923	Asphalt

Tanner–Hiller Airport, (ICAO: K8B5, FAA LID: 8B5) in Barre, Massachusetts, was a single runway public airport last operated by the G&C Group of Acton, MA. The airport closed on September 18, 2024. In its later years, the airport averaged 30 flights per week, and had approximately 25 aircraft and hang gliders based on the field. During the summer months the airport was home to hang gliding operations and ultralight activity. The airport sat adjacent to the Ware River in the town of New Braintree. The property now includes the 1.9 mile Mass Central Rail Trail: New Braintree to Barre Plains, and has begun a process of being converted into Menameset Habitat, a wildlife management area.

== History ==
The airport runway was constructed over the Central Massachusetts Railroad former right of way, a section abandoned in 1941. The airport began operations in 1946, and is named after its historical owners, Fred and Catherine Hiller, and Leonard Tanner. The airport was originally opened by the Hillers. After Fred died, Catherine continued to develop a flight school business at the airport, both as an instructor and as an FAA examiner. In its heyday, the airport was home to many activities and businesses. Camping, swimming, a fine restaurant, and aircraft maintenance were once part of daily operations. A series of different owners passed through between 1973 and 1980, until it was purchased by Leonard Tanner. A notable aircraft that once called the airport home was the prototype of the Lockheed YO-3A quiet observation aircraft, a type later used during the Vietnam War. It was restored in a hangar at the airport before moving on. Leonard Tanner died in 1998 and his estate continued to operate the airport. The airport deteriorated in its final years, something that was particularly apparent in the poor condition of the runway. By November 2015, no services such as fuel were provided. In May 2017, after many years of being offered for sale, the airport was purchased for a reported US$1.1 million by G&C Group of Acton, MA, a subsidiary of a large flight school in China. The final decision to sell was accelerated by the departure of the airport's long time manager, Burchard Aviation, who also operated an aircraft maintenance shop in one of the dilapidated hangars. The airport closed on September 18, 2024, after acquisition by the East Quabbin Land Trust, a Hardwick based land trust, in partnership with Mass Audubon.

As of 2025, the property has begun a process of being converted into Menameset Habitat, a grassland bird sanctuary and wildlife management area, by the Massachusetts Division of Fisheries and Wildlife. In 2026, a portion of the property was converted into a 1.9-mile, section of the Mass Central Rail Trail: New Braintree to Barre Plains, with a compacted stone dust surface. Converting the property into a wildlife refuge also enabled the Ware River restoration & Wheelwright dam removal project to proceed, as construction access was only possible through the former airport property. This project restored natural riverine processes and reconnected 130 miles of high-quality freshwater habitat in the Ware River Watershed, the most continuous stream miles in Massachusetts. The dam was built in the 1800s or early 1900s, and its poor condition prompted Massachusetts to upgrade the status of the dam to a high-hazard level to public safety. It is the largest and most significant dam removal in Massachusetts. The removal began in 2025 and completed in 2026. The final piece of the project is the construction of a pedestrian bridge where the dam once stood, which will extend the Mass Central Rail Trail into Hardwick.

== Former services ==
Hang Glide New England used to operate a hang gliding tandem and instruction business between May and October. The Silver Wings Ultralight Club formerly occupied the west hangar.

== See also ==
- List of airports in Massachusetts
