= Alewife Brook Parkway =

Parkway in Greater Boston, Massachusetts

- Map of Middlesex County in eastern Massachusetts with Alewife Brook Parkway highlighted in red
- Interactive map of Alewife Brook Parkway
- Maintained by: Department of Conservation and Recreation and MassDOT
- Length: 2.05 mi (3.30 km)
- Location: Alewife Brook Reservation, Middlesex County, Massachusetts
- South end: US 3 / Route 2 / Route 16 in Cambridge
- North end: Route 16 / Mystic Valley Parkway in Somerville

Construction
- Completion: 1916
- Alewife Brook Parkway
- U.S. National Register of Historic Places
- U.S. Historic district
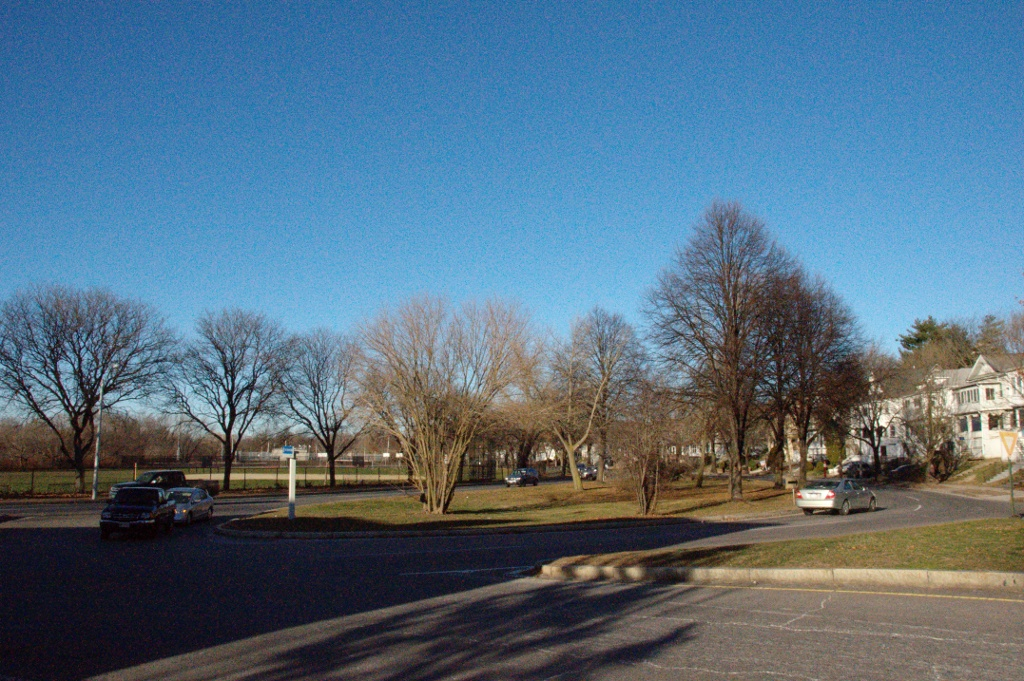
- The parkway at Powder House Boulevard in Somerville

- Location within Massachusetts Location within the United States
- Location: Cambridge and Somerville, Massachusetts
- Built: 1908
- Architect: Charles Eliot; Olmsted Brothers
- MPS: Metropolitan Park System of Greater Boston MPS
- NRHP reference No.: 04000249
- Added to NRHP: March 18, 2004

Alewife Brook Parkway is a short parkway in Cambridge and Somerville, Massachusetts. It is listed on the National Register of Historic Places. It begins at Fresh Pond in Cambridge (linking to Fresh Pond Parkway via Concord Avenue), and heads north on the east bank of Alewife Brook, crossing into West Somerville and ending at the Mystic River on the Medford town line, where it becomes Mystic Valley Parkway. The entire length of Alewife Brook Parkway is designated as part of Massachusetts Route 16 (Route 16), while the southernmost sections are also designated as part of Route 2 and U.S. Route 3 (US 3). It is managed by the Department of Conservation and Recreation with the Massachusetts Department of Transportation responsible for bridge maintenance.

== Route description ==
=== Cambridge ===
The southern terminus of the parkway is the westernmost of the two Fresh Pond rotaries, with Concord Avenue connecting the parkway to Fresh Pond Parkway at the eastern rotary. The road is designated Massachusetts Routes 2 (northbound) and 16 (eastbound), and US Route 3 (northbound). The parkway runs roughly north, skirting just east of the Alewife T station to a large intersection (formerly a rotary), where the limited access highway carrying Route 2 to the west begins. The parkway runs north from this intersection, paralleling just east of the course of Alewife Brook, which forms the western boundary of Cambridge with Arlington. The first major intersection is with Massachusetts Avenue, which carries Massachusetts Route 2A eastward toward Porter Square, and Routes 2A and 3 westward into Arlington.

=== Somerville ===
The parkway continues to parallel Alewife Brook as it heads north into Somerville. After crossing Broadway, the parkway intersects with the western terminus of Powder House Boulevard (formerly a rotary-like interchange). It then passes Dilboy Stadium, on the left, and reaches its northern terminus at a small rotary near where Alewife Brook empties into the Mystic River. There it meets Mystic Valley Parkway, which runs from Arlington just to the west to Medford to the northeast. The Route 16 designation continues northeast. The parkway's total length is just over two miles (about three kilometers).

== History ==
The parkway, with the surrounding Alewife Brook Reservation (115 acres (47 ha)), forms part of the Metropolitan Park System of Greater Boston, established in 1893. It was originally planned by landscape architect Charles Eliot as one section of a web of pleasure roads designed for their aesthetics. Nearby Alewife Brook was straightened and channelized between 1909 and 1912, and construction of the parkway was completed by 1916. Landscaping was performed by the famed Olmsted Brothers firm. Route 2 connected to Alewife Brook Parkway as a highway in the present right-of-way at some point before 1937.

A drive-in theater was built in 1950, replaced by the Fresh Pond Shopping Center in 1962. The current indoor movie theater next to the shopping center was added in 1964.

Along the southern end, Alewife Brook Parkway underwent further changes beginning in the late 1980s, including a new four lane overpass spanning the Fitchburg Line, new dedicated shoulder turning-lanes for exiting and entering the shopping centers, enlarged roundabouts with obstructive center trees removed, new raised grassy medians down the center of the parkway, and new trees, light poles, and bike lanes integrated into the sidewalks. Some of the other amenities integrated in the new design included accessible ramps and stairs on the northbound side of the bridge leading to the Rindge Towers, new sidewalk access to Alewife station, Alewife Linear Park, bike trail adjacent to Jerry's Pond, and a dedicated road for large trucks to service the shopping areas by passing below the overpass.

As traffic has grown over the past century, the original aesthetics of the parkway's southernmost sections have been largely lost. It is now the principal connector between Route 2 and the western suburbs, on the one hand, and downtown Cambridge and Boston on the other, and consequently carries a large volume of commuter traffic. The Alewife MBTA station is a prominent feature on the parkway, and there are shopping centers, parking lots, and office and apartment buildings lining the parkway between Alewife station and the southern terminus.

== Major intersections ==
The entire route is in Middlesex County.

Location	mi	km	Destinations	Notes
Cambridge	0.0	0.0	Route 2 east / Route 16 west / US 3 south / Concord Avenue – Boston, Belmont	Traffic circle; all routes continue south
Cambridge	0.7	1.1	Route 2 west – Concord	Route 2 continues west
Cambridge	1.1	1.8	Route 2A / US 3 west (Massachusetts Avenue) – Winchester, Lexington, Cambridge	US 3 continues north
Somerville	2.1	3.4	Route 16 east / Mystic Valley Parkway west – Arlington, Medford, Revere	Traffic circle; Route 16 continues along Mystic Valley Parkway
1.000 mi = 1.609 km; 1.000 km = 0.621 mi: Route transition

== See also ==
- National Register of Historic Places listings in Cambridge, Massachusetts
- National Register of Historic Places listings in Somerville, Massachusetts
