= Jerry's Pond =

Pond in Cambridge, Massachusetts

Coordinates: 42.3948°N 71.1391°W

Jerry's Pond is an artificial pond created from a clay pit circa 1870 in North Cambridge, Massachusetts. Before being disused, it was known as Jerry's Pit.

== History ==
In the early 1800s, before the clay pits were dug, the site was frequented by night herons and other wildlife. Zoologist Thomas Nuttall brought students to the area to view the birds, which numbered in the hundreds at the time. Great blue herons, last seen there in 1834, nested again on the land in 2018.

Jerry's Pit was likely named after Jeremiah McCrehan, a North Cambridge resident and co-owner of the land until 1878 when it was lost due to foreclosure. The site was used as a clay pit by local brickyards for the natural clay found there. By 1870, all of the available clay had been extracted from the land and Jerry's Pit remained.

The pit became an all-season feature of the North Cambridge neighborhood, with residents gathering there to swim in the summers and to ice skate in the winters. In the 1890s, in response to local residents harvesting ice from the pit to use in their homes, the city Board of Health reported that the water was "entirely unfit for this purpose" and the Cambridge Tribune reported that the site was a, "cesspool of [the] neighborhood." In 1919, local ice cream manufacturer John B. Johnson started harvesting ice for his business from the pit and built an ice cream factory near the site that operated until 1938. It was used as a swimming hole in the neighborhood for decades despite the pollution of the water and frequent drownings.

In the 1940s, the Dewey & Almy Chemical Company purchased the property and spent $5,000 for the city to improve the land for swimming and public use. Swimming remained common there until a pool was built nearby in 1961, named after McCrehan's grandson, Frank McCrehan. After the McCrehan pool opened, a fence was erected around it and the public was prevented from entering. When the Dewey & Almy Chemical Company, now merged with W. R. Grace and Company, owned the land, many toxic chemicals were used including PAHs, naphthalene, and asbestos as a part of a brake development program.

== Restoration ==
In 1995, in response to a developer's proposal, neighbors formed the Alewife Study Group (ASG), which is devoted to:

- Ensuring an inclusive, participatory process on quality of life issues to mitigate the risks of hazardous waste such as asbestos, flooding, and the protection of habitats and natural resources.
- Researching and communicating our findings to all stakeholders.
- Outreaching to neighbors to learn their concerns and hopes and then advocating.

In 2015, a group was formed to restore the site called Friends of Jerry’s Pond along with Mass Audubon, Alewife Study Group, and Green Cambridge. The group also works with young people of the area alongside the city's mayor's employment program. The group hosts an annual cleanup day known as Jerry's PondFest. However, due to the toxic chemicals found in the soil, concerns arose mainly regarding the asbestos. Since it was buried deep in the soil, the asbestos posed no immediate danger to the public, but if it was disturbed by those restoring the park, it could pose a threat to the safety of those around it. Concerns were raised regarding environmental justice because of the high density of affordable housing in the Alewife neighborhood.

In 2020, the site was purchased from W. R. Grace by IQHQ, a real estate developer for $125 million. In April 2023, the company committed to opening up the land for public use. In March 2024, the project got approval from the Cambridge Conservation Commission, and opening was expected in summer 2025. As of 2026, remediation and construction of the Pond was ongoing.
