= Boston University Questrom School of Business =

Business school of Boston University

Coordinates: 42.349°N 71.099°W

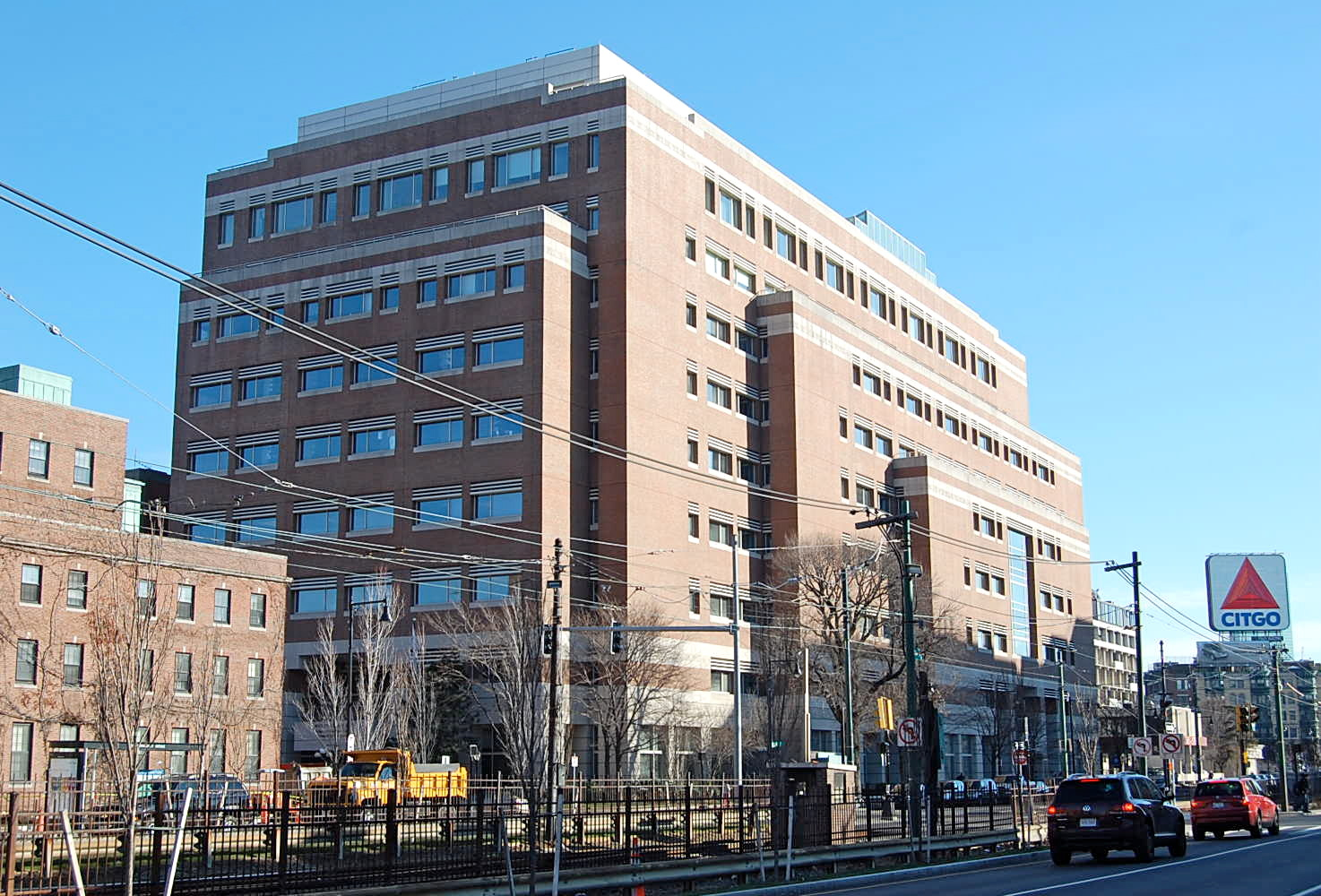
- The Rafik B. Hariri Building
- Former names: College of Business Administration (1913 - 1973); School of Management (1974 - 2014)
- Motto: Questrom Means Business
- Type: Private business school
- Established: 1913; 109 years ago
- Founder: Everett W. Lord
- Parent institution: Boston University
- Dean: Susan Fournier
- Faculty: 255
- Students: 2,629
- Undergraduates: 1,748
- Postgraduates: 881
- Location: Boston, Massachusetts, United States
- Campus: Urban
- Colours: Red
- Website: bu.edu/questrom

The Questrom School of Business (BU Questrom or Questrom) is the business school of Boston University, a private research university based in Boston. Founded in 1913 and formerly known as the College of Business Administration (CBA), then School of Management (SMG) in 1974, to now its current name in 2015.

It is the third-oldest business school in New England, after Dartmouth Tuck School of Business and Harvard Business School. The Questrom School of Business offers a Bachelor of Science in Business Administration (BSBA), Master of Business Administration (MBA) degree (full-and part-time programs, online programs), four Specialty Masters Programs, executive education programs, and three Ph.D. programs. Both the undergraduate and graduate programs offer dual degree options with other schools and colleges at Boston University.

Questrom has some 250 full-time faculty and some 200 part-time faculty, teaching fellows, and active research assistants.

In March 2015, the name was changed from the School of Management to the current, Questrom School of Business. It was named for alumnus Allen Questrom, a former CEO of Neiman Marcus, Macy's, JCPenney, among others, who with his wife Kelli, donated $50 million to Boston University.

== Academics ==
=== Undergraduate programs ===
The BU Questrom School of Business offers undergraduate Bachelor of Science degrees in Business Administration with concentrations in Finance, Information Systems, Accounting, Marketing, Operations and Technology Management, Entrepreneurship, General Management, International Management, Organization Behavior, Business Law and Business Analytics. The Boston University Collaborative Degree Program is a program for a select group of students who choose to pursue a second degree in another field in another BU college; common BUCOP subjects include economics, mathematics, international relations, advertising, and engineering.

The BU Questrom School of Business's Honors Program, which began in 1998, is a business program to which academically talented freshmen and sophomores are invited.

In order to be admitted into the Honors Program sophomore year, students must have a minimum 3.5 GPA in at least 36 credits of completed academic coursework. The application process consists of a cover letter, a resume, an essay, two letters of recommendation, and a personal interview.

=== Graduate programs ===
Business school rankings

U.S. MBA Rankings
- Bloomberg (2025): 51
- U.S. News & World Report (2026): 47

Global MBA Rankings
- QS (2026): 34
- FT (2026): 63

The BU Questrom School of Business offers both online and residential Master of Business Administration (MBA) programs. The MBA is available with concentrations in Social Impact and Health Sector Management, which may also be pursued as part of the combined MBA/MS in Digital Technology (MBA/MSDT) program. In addition to the MBA, Questrom offers a ranges of Specialty Masters degree programs:

- Master of Science in Mathematical Finance and Financial Technology (MSMFT)
- Master of Science in Business Analytics (MSBA)
- Master of Science in Finance (MSF)
- Master of Science in Management Studies (MSMS)

Graduate programs enrolled 281 Full-time MBA, 406 Part-time MBA, 61 Executive MBA, and 50 Ph.D. students during the 2015–16 school year.

The school offers several MBA dual degree programs in conjunction with other BU schools:

- MBA/JD in Law Management (with the School of Law)
- MBA/JD in Health Sector Management (with the School of Law)
- MBA/MD (with the School of Medicine)
- MBA/MA in Medical Science (with the School of Medicine's Medical Science Division)
- MBA/MPH in Health Care Management (with the School of Public Health)
- MBA/MPH in Global Health Management (with the School of Public Health)
- MBA/MS in Quantitative Economics (with the Graduate College of Arts and Sciences)
- MBA/MS in International Relations (with the Graduate College of Arts and Sciences)
- MBA/MS in Manufacturing Engineering (with the Department of Mechanical Engineering in the College of Engineering)
- MBA/MS in Television Management (with the College of Communication)

== Executive Education Programs ==
The Questrom School of Business offers several executive education programs and seminars as well as an 18-month Executive MBA program, which meets every other Friday through Saturday and offers professionals an opportunity to obtain an MBA and build management skills without leaving their jobs.

The Executive Leadership Center offers open registration and custom-designed management seminars, ranging from one day to several weeks.

== International Field Seminars - Elective Courses Abroad ==
The Questrom School of Business offers several opportunities to study abroad during short, 3-credit international field seminars. The Innovation Ecosystems Field Seminar focuses on tech innovation in Israel, with company visits in Tel Aviv and Jerusalem, and cultural visits to Masada and the Dead Sea. The India Field Seminar explores the global forces of the health sector as they intersect with the dynamics of an emerging economy. The Latin America Field Seminar, which takes place in both Chile and Argentina, focuses on the role of business in society as it relates to environmental sustainability, corporate social responsibility and the triple bottom line. The Europe Field Seminar, which travels to Belgium, France, the Netherlands and Hungary, covers topics such as macroeconomic policy, European Integration, finance, international trade, and business culture. The Asia Field Seminar focuses on China's economic development.

== Rafik B. Hariri Building ==
The business school is housed in the Rafik B. Hariri Building, located at 595 Commonwealth Avenue. The building opened in October 1996 and contains over 40 classrooms, a 375-seat lecture hall, five computer labs, and the Frederick S. Pardee Management Library. The building offers wireless Internet access throughout as well as 4,000 wired data ports. A Breadwinners Deli and a wired Starbucks are located on the second floor of the building. The Hariri Building also contains 19 team rooms available only for undergraduate and graduate Questrom students to hold team meetings. Room reservations are made online.

The building is named after Rafik B. Hariri, the late former Prime Minister of Lebanon, who was a Boston University trustee. Hariri's two sons attended BU, and Hariri's philanthropic foundation made a donation for the construction of the new building.

== Notable alumni ==
- Keith B. Alexander, Director, National Security Agency
- Norman Barron, Founder, Marshalls Department Store
- Jay Cashman, CEO, Jay Cashman, Inc.
- Millard Drexler, Former Chairman & CEO, J.Crew
- Jim Brett, CEO, J.Crew
- Jerald G. Fishman, CEO, Analog Devices
- Meera Gandhi, Founder & CEO, The Giving Back Foundation
- James F. Jeffrey, Ambassador, U.S. Department of State
- Vincent Larusso, actor
- Peter J. Levine, General Partner, Andreessen Horowitz
- Tom Magliozzi, Host, Car Talk
- Don McGrath, CEO, BancWest Corp; Chairman & CEO, Bank of the West
- Dirk Meyer, President & CEO, Advanced Micro Devices
- Frederick S. Pardee, Former Researcher at the RAND Corporation, real estate investor, philanthropist.
- John Perkins, Author, Confessions of an Economic Hit Man
- Christine Poon, Former Vice Chairman, Johnson & Johnson
- Allen Questrom, Retired Chairman and CEO of JC Penney and the namesake of the Questrom School of Business
- Elizabeth H. Roberts, Lieutenant Governor, Rhode Island
- Alfred Sant, Former Prime Minister, Republic of Malta
- Aydin Senkut, Founder & Managing Partner, Felicis Ventures
- Analjit Singh, Founder & Chairman Emeritus, Max Group
- John F. Smith Jr., Retired Chairman & CEO, General Motors
- John Svenson, co-founder, The Abbey Group and Part Owner, Boston Celtics
- Tom Szkutak, CFO Amazon.com
- Edward Zander, Chairman & CEO, Motorola
- Janet Petro, Acting Director of NASA, Director of the Kennedy Space Center

== See also ==
- List of United States business school rankings
- List of business schools in the United States
