= Big Dig ceiling collapse =

2006 highway tunnel disaster in Massachusetts, U.S.

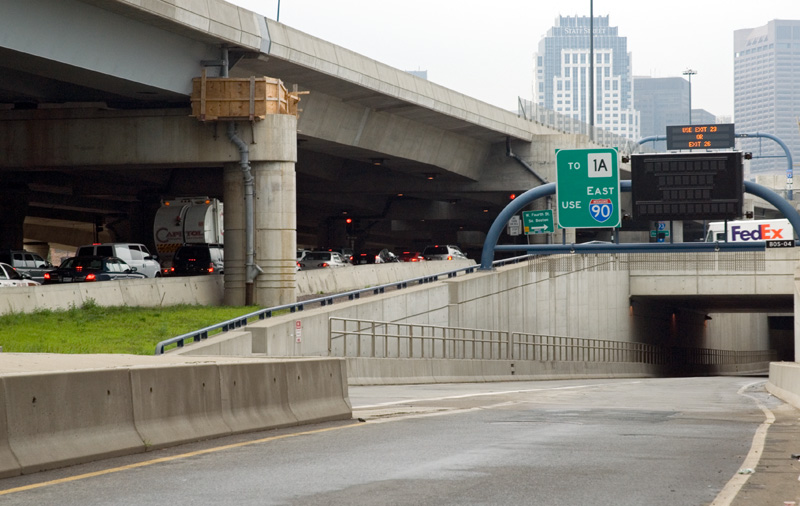
- Traffic crawls over a closed Fort Point Channel Tunnel entrance in Boston during rush hour on July 11, 2006, a day after the collapse.
- Date: July 10, 2006
- Location: Boston, Massachusetts, U.S.; 42.3471°N 71.0411°W
- Cause: Ceiling collapse
- Deaths: 1
- Injuries: 1

On July 10, 2006, a concrete ceiling panel and debris weighing 26 short tons (52,000 lb; 24,000 kg) and measuring 20 by 40 feet (6.1 by 12.2 m) fell in the Fort Point Channel Tunnel (which connects to the Ted Williams Tunnel) in Boston, Massachusetts, US. The panel fell on a car traveling on the two-lane ramp connecting northbound I-93 to eastbound I-90 in South Boston, killing a passenger and injuring the driver. Investigation and repair of the collapse caused a section of the Big Dig project to be closed for almost a year, causing chronic traffic backups.

== Cause ==
The east ends of the westbound and eastbound connector tunnels were designed and constructed in the same manner. Both ends of the tunnel were built sooner than the connecting section, in order to allow the D Street bridge above to be constructed sooner. The end sections had not been designed to incorporate a hanging ceiling system like that used in the connecting section.

The collapse of the ceiling structure began with the simultaneous creep-type failure of several anchors embedded in epoxy in the tunnel's roof slab. Each of the panel's intersecting connection points consists of several individual bolts anchored into the roof slab concrete. The failure of a group of anchors set off a chain reaction which caused other adjacent connection groups to creep then fail, dropping 26 short tons (52,000 lb; 24,000 kg) of concrete to the roadway below.

Numerous problems with this same system of bolts and epoxy in the Ted Williams Tunnel had been previously revealed in a 1998 Office of the Inspector General report. Not only were the bolts too short, but the epoxy used to glue the bolts into the concrete was not up to standard. The state Turnpike Authority and the Federal Highway Administration, citing the ongoing criminal investigation, refused requests received after the accident to release documents relating to the work conducted along the Seaport connector, including:

- deficiency reports that would have shown problems flagged during initial work on the tunnel;
- construction change orders that would have shown costly repairs and contract revisions that occurred because of deficiencies;
- inspection reports and other documents that would show who would have knowledge of the workmanship and building material quality.

One year earlier, U.S. House Representative Stephen Lynch also had trouble obtaining records regarding the Big Dig tunnel leaks for the Congress' Committee on Government Oversight.

== Aftermath and response ==
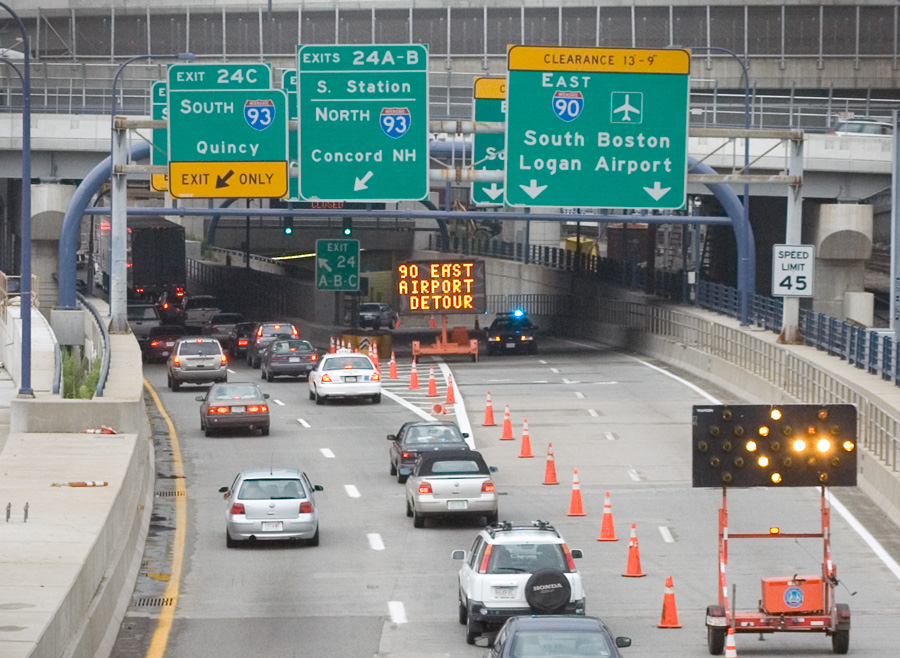
Overflow traffic on I-90 (eastbound at the South Bay Interchange), after the rightmost lanes leading into the tunnel were blocked off

After the ceiling collapse, Attorney General Tom Reilly described the tunnel as a crime scene and issued subpoenas to the companies and individuals responsible for the tunnel construction and testing. Governor Mitt Romney returned from a vacation in New Hampshire to view the condition of the tunnels.

The Governor ordered the closure of the connecting roads that lead into the Fort Point Channel Tunnel and several ramps to the westbound section from within the city. These closures caused dramatic overflow congestion throughout the city as motorists sought alternate routes to and from Logan International Airport and several other key arterial routes. Beyond the difficulties posed within the city, the Fort Point Channel Tunnel and Ted Williams Tunnel link the Massachusetts Turnpike and Interstate 93 to Logan, so this also blocked a key inbound link for airport travelers coming from outside the city, forcing them to seek alternate routes like the Callahan Tunnel or follow poorly marked detours that wound through the city, often resulting in additional travel times of one hour or more.

The legislature approved the governor's plan to assume oversight of the investigation into the collapse (as Romney had only gained office in 2003, long after any decisions about the construction had been made, he was seen as a good choice for an independent investigator), taking responsibility away from the Massachusetts Turnpike Authority, and additionally allocating $20 million for a "stem to stern" safety review of the Central Artery system. At the request of all the members of the Massachusetts congressional delegation, the National Transportation Safety Board dispatched a six-member civil engineering team to Boston to inspect the accident scene and determine whether a full-scale investigation was warranted.

== Problems identified ==
Safety inspections following the accident identified 242 potentially dangerous bolt fixtures supporting the ceiling tiles in the Interstate 90 connector tunnel. As problems throughout the tunnels were identified, various sections of roadway were closed to make repairs, then later re-opened. New concerns about ceiling fans, weighing approximately three tons each, used to circulate air throughout the tunnel system, were also identified.

The National Transportation Safety Board released a report on the one-year anniversary of the disaster, that attributed the major cause of the collapse to "epoxy creep". On August 8, 2007, a Suffolk County Grand Jury indicted epoxy company Powers Fasteners, Inc., on one charge of involuntary manslaughter, with the maximum penalty in Massachusetts being a fine of $1,000. In 2008, the company agreed to pay the city and state a total of $16 million to dismiss the charges. It also paid an additional $6 million to the family of the killed passenger. It also agreed to stop production of the type of epoxy that had been used in the tunnel construction and to issue a recall to customers who had purchased it in the past.

The epoxy used in the D Street portal that failed cost $1,287.60. The cost to redesign, inspect, and repair all of the tunnels after the collapse was $54 million.

== Political fallout ==
On July 13, 2006, the leaders of the state legislature, Senate President Robert Travaglini and House Speaker Sal DiMasi, called upon Turnpike Authority chairman Matthew J. Amorello, who provided oversight of the project, to consider stepping down from his position and accepting a diminished role. Governor Romney and Attorney General Reilly both called for the resignation of Amorello. This stance was supported in editorials in Boston's two major newspapers, the Boston Herald and The Boston Globe. On July 18, Amorello was presented with a formal list of charges that Romney intended to use to justify Amorello's removal.

Amorello made an unsuccessful effort to ask the Massachusetts Supreme Judicial Court to postpone the removal hearing before Romney. On July 27, 2006, after the Supreme Judicial Court rejected his request and shortly before the hearing was to have begun, Armorello announced his intention to resign as Chairman of the Massachusetts Turnpike Authority effective August 15, 2006.

Massachusetts Secretary of Transportation John Cogliano also came under fire after he chose to hire Bechtel/Parsons Brinckerhoff, the company that was responsible for overseeing the original construction of the tunnel, to inspect the repairs. The hiring of Bechtel/Parsons Brinckerhoff resulted in an inquiry from the Office of Inspector General for the Department of Transportation. Cogliano admitted that he regretted reusing the firm and the state promised not to hire any Bechtel/Parsons Brinckerhoff employees to work on repairs in the I-90 tunnel.

== Lawsuits ==
On November 27, 2006, departing Attorney General Tom Reilly announced that the state would launch a civil suit over the collapse of the ceiling in the Ted Williams Tunnel. The Commonwealth will be seeking over $150 million from project manager Bechtel/Parsons Brinckerhoff, builder Modern Continental Construction Co. and the manufacturer of the epoxy used to hold the ceiling bolts.

Attorney General Martha Coakley on March 1, 2007, named Paul Ware from Goodwin Procter, a Boston law firm, as the lead in the criminal investigation into whether there was criminal culpability in the Big Dig tunnel collapse and was appointed as a special assistant attorney general.

On December 24, 2007, the family of Milena Del Valle (who was killed in the collapse) and Angel Del Valle (who was injured) announced that they had reached a settlement with Powers Fasteners, in which they would be paid $6 million. The Del Valle family stated, "We are grateful that the Powers family company has done the right thing." Powers denied responsibility, but said that the settlement would "allow the healing process to begin." Powers also stated "We also hope that this will lead others who, unlike Powers, truly were responsible for the accident, to do the same."

In January 2008, the state and the office of United States Attorney for the District of Massachusetts, Michael Sullivan, reached a settlement with the contractors responsible for the failure, which included no criminal charges and no bar against receiving future contracts. The Bechtel/Parsons Brinckerhoff joint venture paid $405 million, and smaller contractors paid a total of $51 million.

In September 2008, the Del Valle family announced that they had reached a $28 million settlement, resolving the lawsuits against all 15 companies involved in construction of the tunnel, including the Massachusetts Turnpike Authority.

== Other problems ==
There were other difficulties with the design and construction of the Big Dig project, including numerous leaks, dangerous guardrails, and the threat of heavy lighting fixtures also falling from the ceilings.

The Georgia DOT found that failure of the same epoxy at fault for the ceiling collapse was also to blame for the 2011 fall of a fenced and lighted covered-walkway structure attached to the south side of the relatively new 17th Street Bridge, which links Atlantic Station to Midtown Atlanta over I-75/I-85. No injuries occurred in that incident, as the collapse was in the overnight hours, with very little traffic on the freeway.

== See also ==
- Sasago Tunnel — Japanese tunnel where a similar ceiling collapse occurred in 2012
