= Matthew J. Amorello =

American politician

Matthew John Amorello
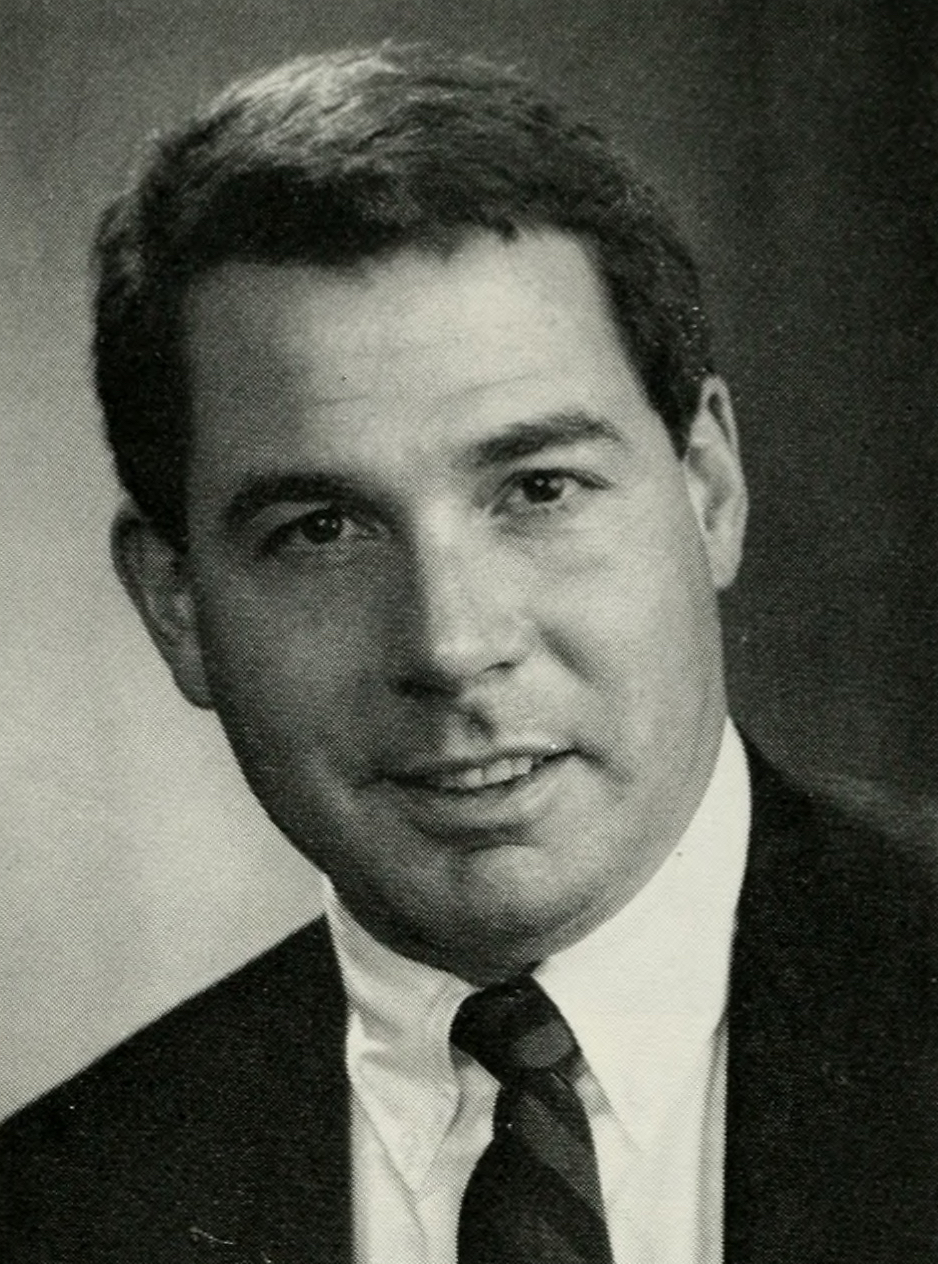
- Amorello, circa 1991

Chairman of the Massachusetts Turnpike Authority
- In office February 6, 2002 – August 15, 2006
- Preceded by: David Forsberg
- Succeeded by: John Cogliano

Member of the Massachusetts Senate
- In office 1991–1999
- Preceded by: John P. Houston
- Succeeded by: Guy Glodis

Personal details
- Party: Republican

Matthew John Amorello (born March 15, 1958) is a former Massachusetts state senator and former chairman of the Massachusetts Turnpike Authority who presided over the Central Artery/Third Harbor Tunnel Project (Big Dig) from 2002 to 2006. The Massachusetts Turnpike Authority is the agency that was in charge of the Big Dig project.

== Early life ==
Amorello was born on March 15, 1958, in Worcester, Massachusetts. He graduated from Grafton Memorial High School, Assumption College (B.A.), American University (M.P.A.), and Suffolk University Law School (J.D.). Prior to running for office, he worked for the Environmental Protection Agency as a budget analyst and wetlands protection specialist. He was also vice chairman of the Grafton, Massachusetts, conservation commission.

== Political career ==
=== Massachusetts Senate ===
Shortly after graduating from law school, Amorello ran for the First Worcester and Middlesex District seat in the Massachusetts Senate. He won the 1990 Republican primary as a write-in candidate then defeated Democratic incumbent John P. Houston by 782 votes in the general election. He was reelected in 1992, 1994, and 1996. In 1998 he ran for the United States House of Representatives seat in Massachusetts's 3rd congressional district, but lost to incumbent Jim McGovern 56.9% to 41.5%.

=== Massachusetts highway commissioner ===
In December 1998, Amorello was appointed Massachusetts highway commissioner by governor Paul Cellucci. In 2000, Amorello was reprimanded by the governor after an investigation found that Amorello's campaign committee had solicited and received $7,000 in donations from contractors doing business with the highway department. The investigation also found that Amorello did not know his campaign committee was soliciting funds from these companies and had returned all of their donations. The investigation also found that Amorello violated state policy by not reporting an accident in a state vehicle he was driving, but concluded there was no evidence that he was driving while intoxicated.

=== Massachusetts Turnpike Authority ===
In 2002, acting governor Jane Swift appointed Amorello to the Massachusetts Turnpike Authority chairmanship, which put him in charge of the Big Dig, a project that was billions of dollars over budget and years past its completion date. Under his leadership, the project was finished, with the Connector and O'Neill Tunnels tunnels opening during his chairmanship. In 2003, Amorello's campaign committee was fined $10,000 by the Federal Election Commission for failing to report campaign donations that exceeded legal limits within the required 60 days.

Amorello clashed with Swift's successor, Mitt Romney. The governor petitioned the Massachusetts General Court to abolish the turnpike authority and merge it with the state highway department. In 2003, the state legislature passed a transportation bill that would eliminate the chairman's post in 2007 and turn over leadership of the authority to a general manager. In 2004, Romney asked Amorello to resign after The Boston Globe reported that turnpike authority officials were aware of hundreds of leaks in Big Dig tunnels, but did not take action to repair them. Amorello refused to resign. In 2005, Amorello interviewed for the job of chief executive of the Olympic Delivery Authority, a position that would oversee all for the 2012 Summer Olympics in London. David Higgins was chosen instead. After the collapse of a portion of the roof of the I-90 Connector Tunnel on July 10, 2006, in which 38-year-old Milena Del Valle, of Jamaica Plain, was killed, Romney and all but one of the candidates in that year's gubernatorial election called for Amorello's resignation. On July 18, 2006, Romney began legal proceedings to remove Amorello. On July 27, 2006, Amorello agreed to resign, effective August 15, after the Massachusetts Supreme Judicial Court ruled that he could not block a hearing on whether or not he should be removed from office. He received full pay until February 15, 2007.

In 2009, the Massachusetts Ethics Commission found that Amorello had violated conflict-of-interest laws by changing a sick leave policy that would benefit him. He was fined $2,000.

== Post-government activities ==
In 2009, Amorello and one of his brothers co-founded a solar energy company.

On August 9, 2010, a judge issued a warrant for Amorello's arrest when he failed to show up in court to face a drunken driving charge. He was charged with drunken driving and leaving the scene after causing property damage. Amorello was ordered to give up his driver’s license for 45 days, pay up to $1,300 in fines, and enter an alcohol treatment program.

As of 2015, Amorello works for a large engineering firm.

== See also ==
- 1993–1994 Massachusetts legislature
