= Cogliano =

Cogliano is an Italian surname. Notable people with the surname include:

- Andrew Cogliano (born 1987), Canadian ice hockey player
- John Cogliano, American politician
