= James Brett =

James Brett could refer to:

- James Brett (cricketer), English cricketer who played in the 1800s
- James Seymour Brett (born 1974), English composer and conductor
- James T. Brett (born 1949), American politician
- Jim Brett, American business executive
