= Brand relationship =

Concept in marketing

A consumer-brand relationship, also known as a brand relationship, is the relationship that consumers think, feel, and have with a product or company brand. For more than half a century, scholarship has been generated to help managers and stakeholders understand how to drive favorable brand attitudes, brand loyalty, repeat purchases, customer lifetime value, customer advocacy, and communities of like-minded individuals organized around brands. Research has progressed with inspiration from attitude theory and, later, socio-cultural theories, but a perspective introduced in the early 1990s offered new opportunities and insights. The new paradigm focused on the relationships that formed between brands and consumers: an idea that had gained traction in business-to-business marketing scholarship where physical relationships formed between buyers and sellers.

== History ==
Two catalysts can be credited for the brand relationship paradigm. Max Blackston's 1992 piece, "Observations: Building Brand Equity by Managing the Brand's Relationships," highlighted for the first time that brands themselves were active partners in a relationship, and called for attention not just to people's perceptions of and attitudes toward brands, but also to the reciprocating construct: what people thought the brand thought of them. Susan Fournier took this idea of an active brand partner with her thesis in 1994 titled "A Consumer-Brand Relationship Framework for Strategic Brand Management".

Nearly 25 years later, there now exists a robust and varied scholarly sub-discipline on brand relationships, with contributions from a range of theoretical disciplines including social and cognitive psychology, anthropology, sociology, culture studies, and economics, and methods from empirical modeling to experiments, ethnography, and depth interviewing. Hundreds of articles, book chapters and books on brand relationships have been published on this topic. Fetscherin and Heinrich in 2014 conducted an extensive literature review on this topic and analyzed 392 papers by 685 authors in 101 journals. They concluded brand relationships are notably interdisciplinary with publications in many different fields such as applied psychology, communication as well as business management and marketing. They identified seven sub-research streams consisting (1) relationship between various constructs such as brand loyalty, trust, commitment, attachment, personality; (2) the effects of CBR on consumer behavior; (3) brand love; (4) brand communities; (5) CBR and culture and brand cult; (6) self–brand-connections (e.g., self-congruence); and (7) storytelling and brand relationships. The Consumer Brand Relationships Association (CBRA) is the world's leading network for practitioners and academics interested in the study of the relationships consumers have with brands. Their website states that "to promote this field, advance knowledge, facilitate the exchange of information, and encourage collaboration".

== Relationship types ==
Fajer and Schouten (1995) present the Typology of Loyalty-Ordered Person-Brand Relationships as summarized below in the table.

Lower-order relationships	Higher-order relationships
Potential friends / Casual friends	Close friends / Best friends / Crucial friends
Brand trying / Brand liking	Multi-brand loyalty / Brand loyalty / Brand addiction

Later, Fournier (1998) provides a typology of 15 brand relationships derived from phenomenological research

Compartmentalized friendships	Arranged marriage	Rebounds	Dependencies	Secret affairs
Marriages of convenience	Committed partnerships	Best friendships	Childhood friendships	Flings
Kinships	Courtships	Enmities	Enslavement	Casual friends

A more abstract typology is also supported that distinguishes exchange versus communal relationships. Aggarwal provides a theory that distinguishes these two basic brand relationship types according to the exchange norms that operate within them.

Hyun Kyung Kim, Moonkyu Lee, and Yoon Won Lee (2005) in their paper Developing a Scale For Measuring Brand Relationship Quality present the following dimensions to measure brand relationship quality.

- Self connective Attachment
- Satisfaction
- Behavioral Commitment
- Trust
- Emotional Intimacy

Max Blackston, in his 2018 book "Brand Love is not Enough" elaborates the concept of a Brand's Attitude, that was first proposed in his 1992 paper "A Brand with an Attitude." He describes five Universal Brand Relationships, each defined by a specific type of Brand Image and a specific type of Brand's Attitude. They are:

1. Reinforcement - the consumer's perception of the superior performance of brand, combined with the perception that the brand makes the consumer better ( smarter, more effective) too.
2. Identification - the consumer loves the brand because it reflects and expresses his/her own values and aspirations. Crucially, the consumer's love of the brand is felt to be reciprocated.
3. Role Model - combines Brand Charisma, the perception that the brand has a progressive style of leadership and innovation, with Mentoring, the feeling that the brand encourages and enables the consumer to lift their game to a higher level too.
4. Self-Differentiation - Brand Differentiation, the engine of brand growth, combined with a perception that the brand is "there for me", that its points of difference include and define the customer too.
5. Playful - the brand embodies the pleasure principle (fun, cool, easy, relaxing) with the perception that it wants to give pleasure to its consumer unconditionally.

== Relationship models ==
=== Brand attachment ===
Many studies compare "brand love" to the concept of interpersonal love as placed on Sternberg's triangular theory of love. Some argue that brand love is similar to interpersonal love while others, such as Batra, Ahuvia, and Bagozzi (2012) state that "there are compelling reasons these conceptualizations of interpersonal love should not be applied directly to brand love" (p. 1). Some suggest brand love is more a parasocial love relationship.

Multi-faceted strength notions are also recommended. Among these are Fournier's Brand Relationship Quality index, which has seven facets:

- Love/Passion
- Brand-Self Identity Connection
- Brand-Social Other Communal connection
- Commitment
- Interdependence
- Intimacy
- Brand partner quality

Through an analysis conducted by Fournier (1998), a six faceted brand relationship quality construct was drafted. There are dimensions in a relationship in which they all determine the strength of a consumer-brand relationship, these dimensions include: love and passion, self-connection, interdependence, commitment, intimacy, and brand partner quality.

- Love and passion - the essence of all strong brand relationships. It refers to the depth of the emotional connection between that brand and the consumer. There are many works about brand love. Most notable is the one by Batra, Ahuvia, Bagozzi (2012).
- Self-connection - the extent to which the brand conveys important identity concerns, tasks, or themes, therefore communicates a significant aspect of self. A strong brand relationship is maintained by strong self-connections to the brand. This is due to the ever-growing protective feelings of uniqueness, dependency, and encouragement of resilience in the face of negative events.
- Interdependence - involves regular interactions between the brand and the consumer, increased scope and diversity of brand-related actions, and the increased intensity of personal experiences.
- Commitment - refers to the stability of the consumer's attitude towards the brand relationship, and can be seen as the intention and dedication to the longevity of the relationship.
- Intimacy - how close the consumers feel with the brand, and also refers to the mutual understanding and acceptance of both the brand and the consumer.
- Brand partner quality - what the consumer thinks about the performance of the brand in the relationship. The factors of this quality are trust, reliability, and expectation fulfillment.

=== Brand community ===
According to Stokburger-Sauer (2010), a brand community is a group of people who have the same consumer-brand bond. This can be defined through the relationships between a consumer and a product, a brand, a company, and other consumers/owners. Stokburger-Sauer say that when a community's brand may continue to support a brand despite negative publicity.

=== Brand intimacy ===
"Brand intimacy" attempts to measure the level of emotional connection a brand has with its customers. Using the concept of emotional branding that an emotional response, as opposed to rational thought, dominates a customer's buying choice, brand intimacy ascribes a qualitative approach to the emotional connection between brand and customer.

Brand intimacy posits that in order for a brand to succeed, it must appeal and connect with a customer's emotions.

Compared to Standard & Poor's and the Fortune 500's top brands, brands ranked highly in intimacy outperform in revenue and profit annually and also over a duration of time.

The brand intimacy model attempts to analyze the relationship a consumer has with a brand. It is described as having three different levels: sharing, bonding, and fusing, each representing an increasing level of trust and emotional attachment a customer has to a particular brand. The goal of brand intimacy is to create long-term purchasing relationships between consumers and particular companies.

==== Stages ====
Although emotional connection is necessary for brand intimacy, not every customer who has formed an emotional connection with a brand necessarily reaches a stage of brand intimacy. Instead, the forming of an intimate relationship between brand and customer (or user of a brand) is often completed in a series of stages of increasing intimacy.

These stages are:

1. Sharing - The user gains an understanding of the brand, its purpose and reputation; the company in control of the brand also gains an understanding of the brand's user or audience base.
2. Bonding - the level of intimacy between user and brand strengthens.
3. Fusing - a brand has not only formed a part of the user's daily experience, the brand often provides a service that the user cannot live without.

==== Findings ====
Brand intimacy has been studied in various industries to provided data into the emotional connection brands have with their customers.

Among brands, Apple has consistently scored the highest of all brands for brand intimacy, with Amazon and Disney also measuring competitively for brand intimacy.

== Outcomes ==
Positive brand relationship outcomes

- Word of mouth
- Purchase intention
- Purchase behavior

Negative brand relationship outcomes

- Negative word of mouth
- Public complaining
- Brand avoidance
- Brand divorce
- Brand retaliation

Historically advertisers spend money on bringing in new customers rather than on building up relationships with existing customers. Modern marketers attempt to reinforce consumer-brand relationships, which produces benefits for the company such as reduced marketing costs, ease of access to customers, acquiring new customers, customer retention, brand equity, and more profit.

The stronger the consumer-brand relationships tend to be, the more likely it is to produce positive results.

There are gaps in what marketers know about negative relationships, which can cause problems for brands. The negative information consumers hear are more enduring, diagnostic, and conspicuous, and also it is deeply processed in the mind, and is more likely to be shared within social groups than positive information. This would explain why some strong positive brand relationships can readily turn into hateful, antagonistic associations.

== Related concepts ==
There are many different concepts and facets studied and related to consumers' relationships to brands (e.g., love styles). These relationships can be positive or negative (love hate relationships). Below a few of those concepts studied in brand relationships:

- Brand community
- Brand engagement
- Cult brand

Fetscherin and Heinrichresent the Brand Connection Matrix. as summarized below in the table

	Low Emotional Connection	High Emotional Connection
High Functional Connection	Functionally invested	Fully Invested
Low Functional Connection	Un-invested	Emotionally invested

Fetscherin and Heinrich (2014) also present another taxonomy, the Brand Feeling Matrix as summarized below in the table.

	Weak Relationship	Strong Relationship
Positive Feelings	E.g., Brand Satisfaction	E.g., Brand Passion/Brand Love/Brand Loyalty
Negative Feelings	E.g., Brand Avoidance	E.g., Brand Hate/Brand Divorce

== Bibliography ==
- Batra, R, Ahuvia, A., and Bagozzi, R., (2012), Brand love, Journal of Marketing, 76(2), pp. 1–16.
- Blackstone, M. (1993), Beyond Brand Personality: Building Brand Relationships, in Brand Equity & Advertising: Advertising's Role in Building Strong Brands, (eds.) David A. Aaker, and Alexander Biel, pp. 113–124.
- Fetscherin, M., (2014) "What type of relationship do we have with loved brands?", Journal of Consumer Marketing, Vol. 31 Iss: 6/7, pp. 430 – 440
- Fetscherin, M., and Heinrich, D. (2014), "Consumer Brand Relationships: A Research Landscape", Journal of Brand Management, Vol. 21, No. 5, pp. 366–371.
- Fournier, S. (1998), Consumers and Their Brands: Developing Relationship Theory in Consumer Research, Journal of Consumer Research, 24(4), pp. 343–373.
- Fournier, S., Breazeale, and M., Fetscherin, M. (2012), Consumer-Brand Relationships: Theory and Practice, Routledge, pp. 456.
- MacInnis, D., Park, W., and Priester, J. (2009), Handbook of Brand Relationships, M.E.Sharpe, pp. 424.
- Fajer, M. and John W. Schouten (1995), "Breakdown and Dissolution of Person-Brand Relationships", in NA - Advances in Consumer Research Volume 22, eds. Frank R. Kardes and Mita Sujan, Provo, UT : Association for Consumer Research, Pages: 663–667.
- Veloutsou C., 2007, “Identifying the Dimensions of the Product-Brand and Consumer Relationship”, Journal of Marketing Management, Vol. 23, No. 1/2, pp. 7–26.
