= South Bay Interchange =

Location
- South Bay, Boston, Massachusetts
- Coordinates: 42.346°N 71.060°W
- Roads at junction: I-90 I-93; US 1 Route 3

Construction
- Constructed: 1997–2003
- Opened: 2003
- Maintained by: Massachusetts Department of Transportation

The South Bay Interchange is a massive interchange in downtown Boston, Massachusetts, in the US. The interchange consists of Interstate 90, the Mass Pike Extension, and the Interstate 93 concurrency with US 1 and MA 3 south of the Thomas P. O'Neill Jr. Tunnel.

The interchange dominates the South Bay parcel, a 10-acre (40,000 m^{2}) site between Chinatown and the Leather District. It is roughly bounded by Kneeland Street, Hudson Street, the Massachusetts Turnpike mainline, and the Interstate 93 mainline. Currently owned by the Massachusetts Department of Transportation (MassDOT), the area is taken up by a major highway interchange between 90, 93, and local streets. There were original plans to re-develop the area with a 600-foot-tall (180 m) office tower, but no such project has taken place.

== History of the site ==
The South Bay parcel, as well as the adjacent Chinatown and Leather District neighborhoods, sit on filled land. Once part of South Cove, a portion of Boston's South Bay, it was filled in 1833 by the South Cove Corporation, who built an intermodal train/sea station as part of the Boston and Worcester Railroad. This development included residential and commercial area, and what was considered at the time to be the largest hotel in the United States. Throughout most of the 19th century and the early half of the 20th century, the district was made up of rail yards serving railroads entering Boston from the south and west.

The rail yards and terminus attracted leather and garment businesses, which constructed the commercial buildings in the adjacent Leather District. Similarly, the railroad served as an immigrant gateway, a role which it played beginning in the late 19th century for many Asian newcomers, particularly Chinese.

In the 1950s, the Massachusetts Highway Department displaced much of the rail yards to build the John F. Fitzgerald Expressway (the Central Artery). Later the South Bay interchange connected the Central Artery to the Massachusetts Turnpike. The intersection has since been reconstructed by the Big Dig, with tunnels to South Boston and Logan Airport.

== Interchange construction ==
The interchange was constructed beginning in the late 1990s as a major feature of the Big Dig project. By using a variety of methods including soil freezing and tunnel jacking to maintain adjacent subway, freight and commuter rail operations, engineers were able to avoid major interruption of existing traffic flows. The name South Bay originates from the state of the area prior to nineteenth century land reclamation efforts which filled an area of marshes and brackish water that was an estuary of Boston Harbor with dirt from nearby high ground.

== Gallery ==
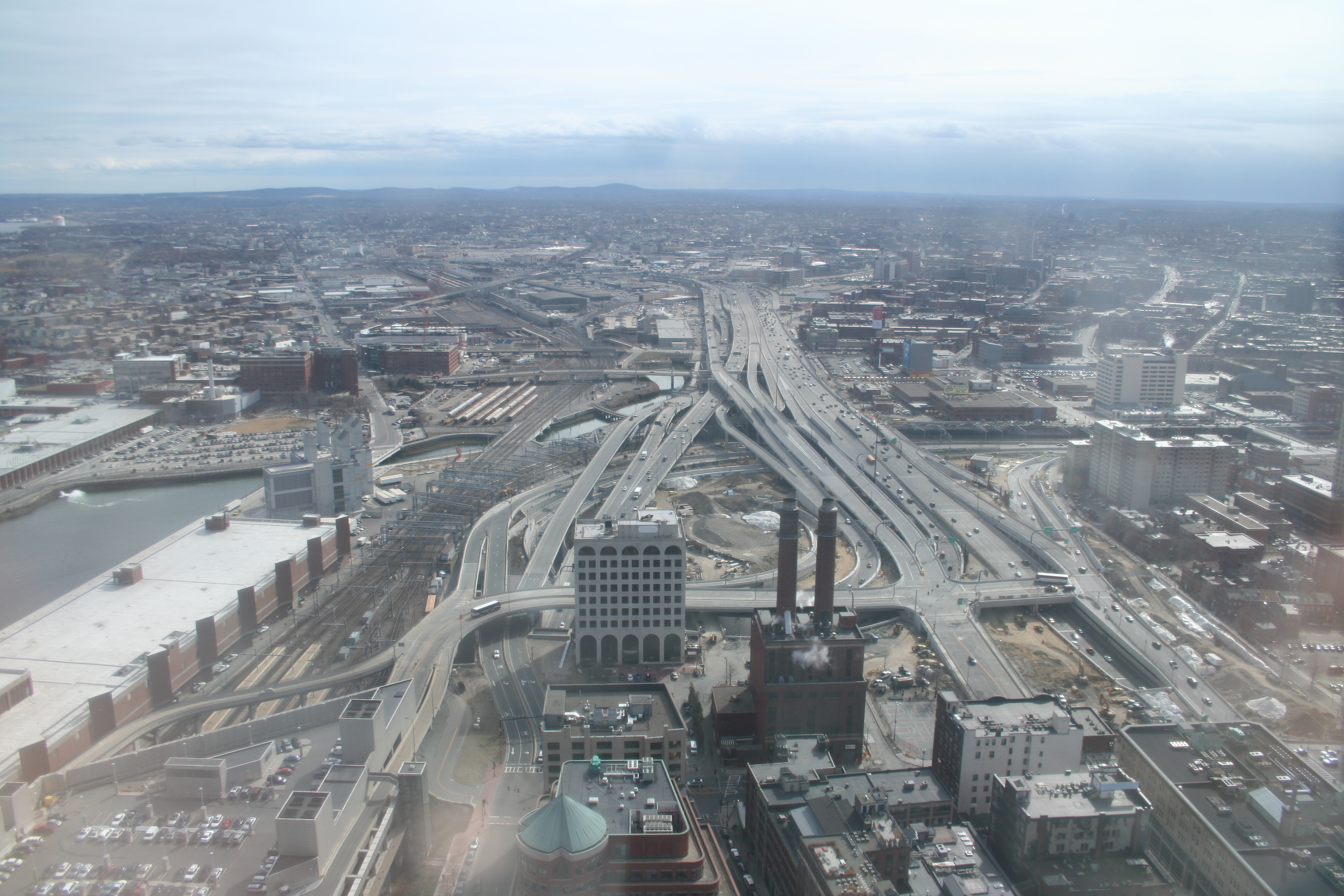
Overlooking South Bay Interchange toward the south-southwest from One Financial Center in Boston, with the Great Blue Hill visible in the background

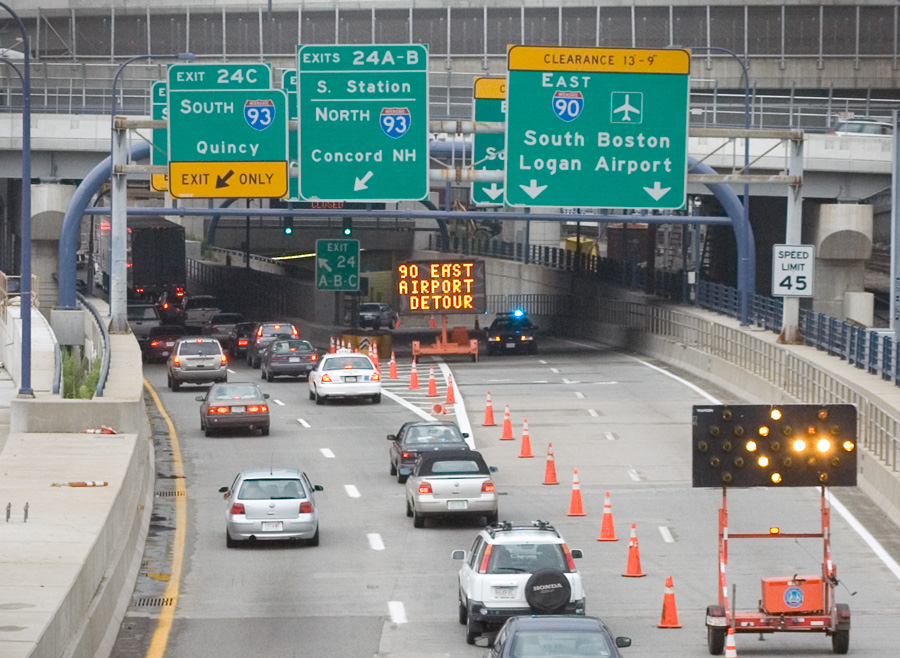
Traffic detoured onto I-93 at the South Bay Interchange after the Big Dig ceiling collapse.
