= Lelio Marino =

American businessman (1935–2004)

Lelio "Les" Marino (c. 1935 – November 12, 2004) was an American entrepreneur. Born in Chieti, Italy, he immigrated to the United States in 1958. He co-founded the construction company Modern Continental in 1967 with business partner Kenneth Anderson, and grew it into a six billion-dollar group of companies with interests in restaurants, marinas, and transportation services in addition to the core construction business.

He died on November 12, 2004, as a result of an infarct.
