= Allen Questrom =

Retired retail executive

- Born: Allen Irving Questrom; April 13, 1941 (age 85); Newton, Massachusetts, U.S.
- Education: Boston University (BSBA)
- Occupations: CEO, Federated Department Stores; Senior Advisor, Lee Equity Partners, LLC

Allen Irving Questrom (born April 13, 1941) is an American retired retail executive. He has been the CEO of Federated Department Stores (Macy's), Neiman Marcus, Barneys New York, and JCPenney. He is also a senior advisor for Lee Equity Partners, LLC.

In 1964, Questrom graduated from Boston University (BU).

The following year, he joined Abraham & Straus as an executive trainee, eventually rising to merchandising manager. After eight years at A, & S., Allen joined Bullock's in 1973, spending five years there as vice president and general merchandise manager and later as executive vice president.

In 1978, Allen became president of Rich's.

In February 1980, Questrom was named chairman and chief executive officer of Rich's, succeeding Joel Goldberg.

Questrom resigned from Rich's for personal reasons in January 1984, and was succeeded as chairman and chief executive by president James M. Zimmerman. After spending the next several months traveling the world, Questrom was named chairman and chief executive officer of Bullock's in August 1984, succeeding Franklin Simon.

Boston University's business school is named after him.

== See also ==
- Questrom School of Business
