= Sasago Tunnel =

Motorway tunnel in Yamanashi, Japan

Sasago Tunnel 笹子トンネル (Sasago Tonneru)
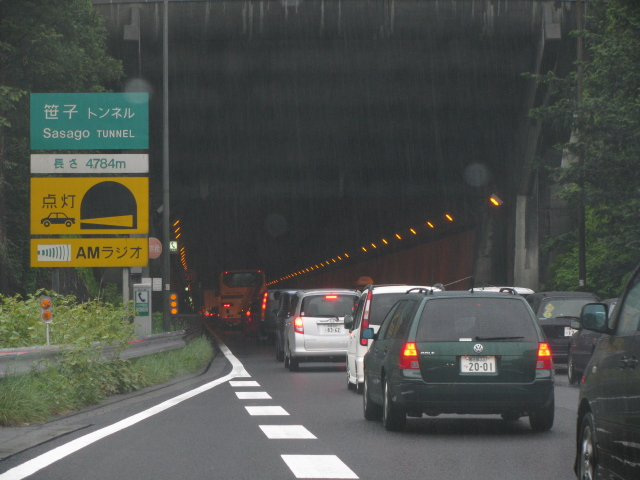
- Kōshū entrance to the Sasago Tunnel; May 2009
- Interactive map of Sasago Tunnel 笹子トンネル (Sasago Tonneru)

Overview
- Location: Yamanashi Prefecture
- Coordinates: 35°37′16″N 138°47′34″E
- Status: Operational
- Route: Chūō Expressway
- Start: Ōtsuki, Yamanashi
- End: Kōshū, Yamanashi

Operation
- Opened: 1977
- Closed: 2012-13 (temporary closure due to ceiling collapse)
- Owner: Central Nippon Expressway Company
- Traffic: Automobiles • Motorbikes

Technical
- Length: 4.784 kilometres (2.973 mi) (Tokyo-bound); 4.717 kilometres (2.931 mi) (Nagoya-bound)
- No. of lanes: 2 uni-directional in each bore

The Sasago Tunnel (笹子トンネル, Sasago Tonneru) is a twin-bore motorway tunnel on the Chūō Expressway located on the border of the cities of Kōshū and Ōtsuki in Yamanashi Prefecture, Japan. It is located about 80 kilometres (50 mi) west of the capital Tokyo. It was built in 1977.

== Ceiling collapse ==
At approximately 8 am on December 2, 2012, nearly 150 concrete ceiling panels inside the Tokyo-bound Sasago Tunnel collapsed, crushing three vehicles, including a van, carrying six persons, that caught fire. The fallen panels were 20 centimetres (7.9 in) thick and weighed 1.2 tonnes (1.2 long tons; 1.3 short tons) each. The caved-in point was 2 kilometres (1.2 mi) from the Tokyo-side exit and spanned a length of 50 to 60 metres (160 to 200 ft). Smoke could be seen billowing from the Kōshū entrance to the tunnel.

Nine people died and two were injured, making it one of the deadliest roadway accidents in Japanese history. The tunnel was closed for a period of 27 days for repairs and removal of ceiling panels, before the south tube reopened on December 29. The north tube, where the collapse happened, reopened on February 8, 2013.

The nature of the collapse closely resembled a similar ceiling collapse in the Fort Point Channel Tunnel in Boston, Massachusetts in 2006.

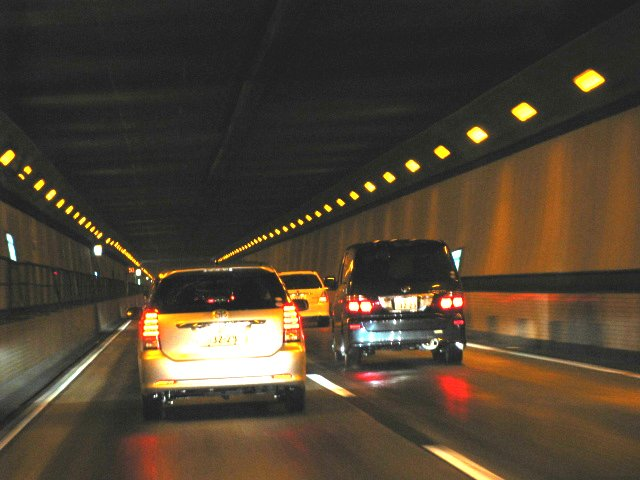
Inside of the tunnel before the accident. Ceiling panels are visible on the top

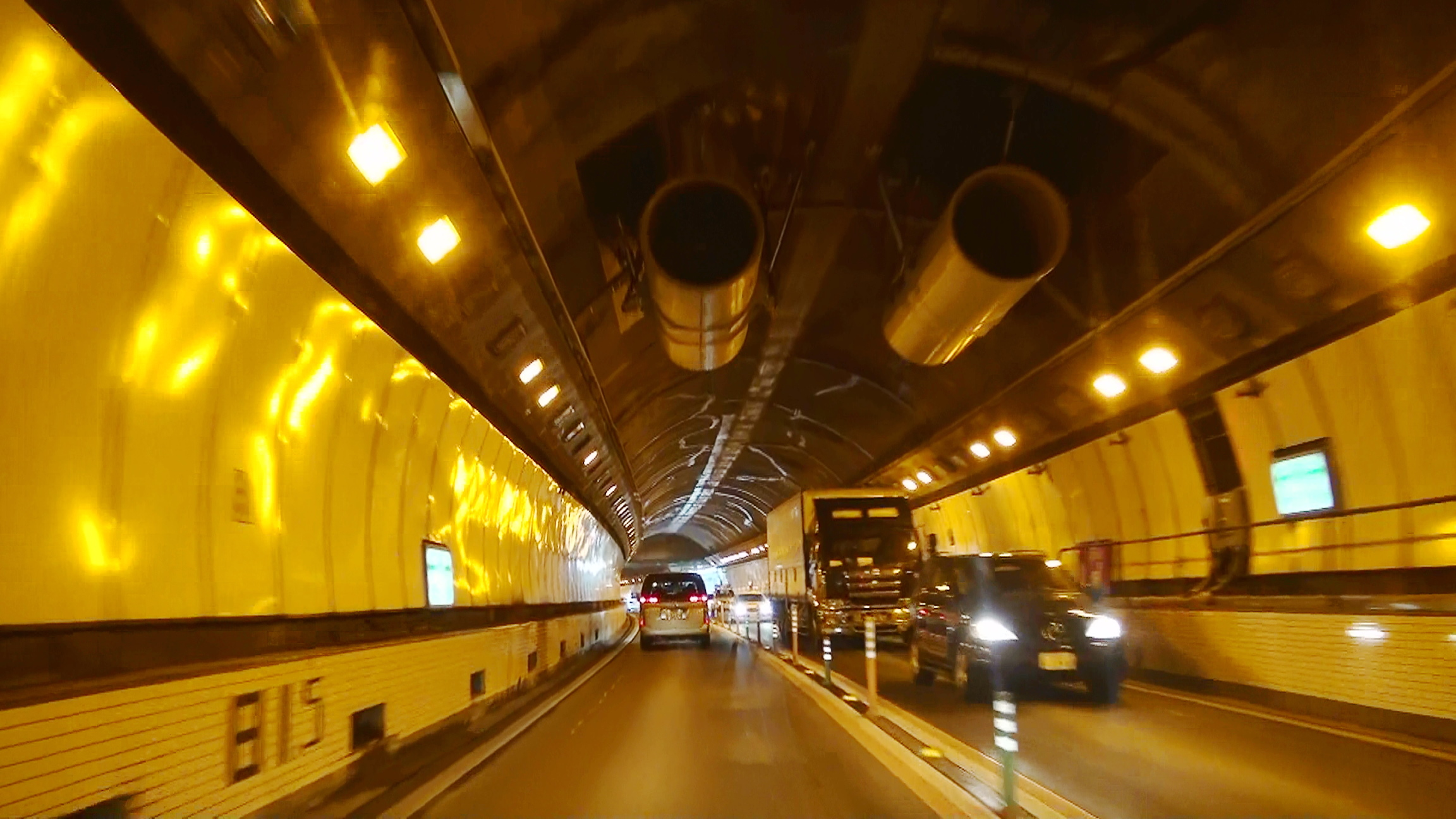
Temporary opening of tunnel with ceiling panels removed and replaced by ceiling fan

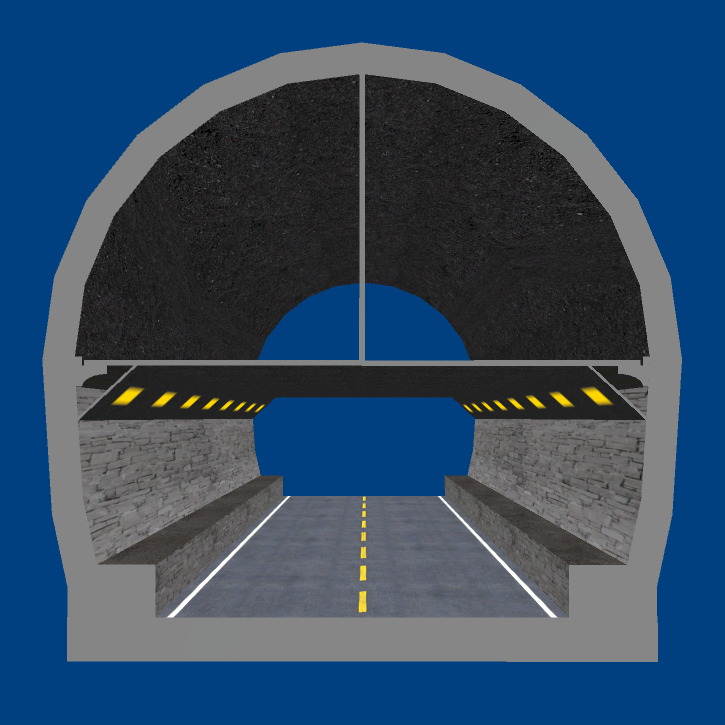
Cross section model of Sasago Tunnel

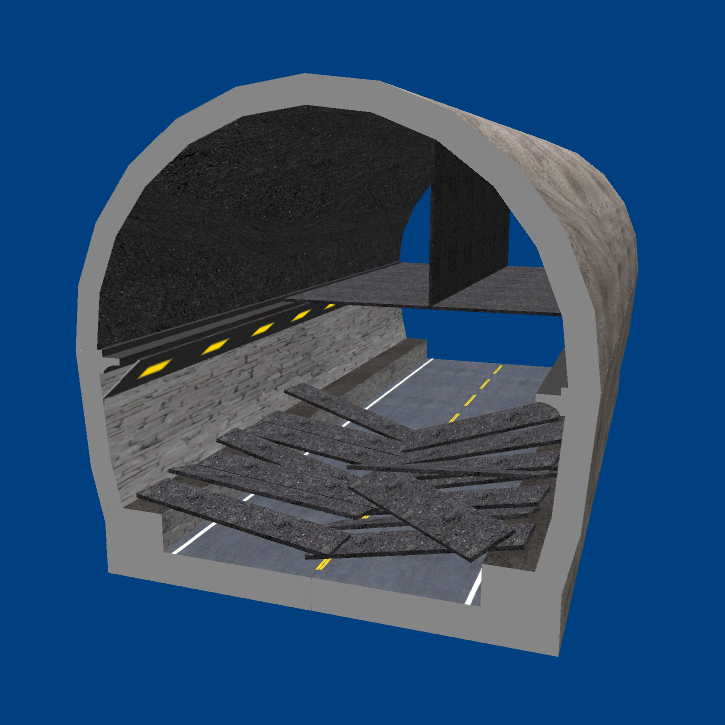
Model showing collapsed ceiling panels
