= Susan Fournier =

American marketing academic

- Born: Woburn, Massachusetts, USA

Academic background
- Education: BS, 1980, University of Massachusetts Amherst; MS, 1983, Pennsylvania State University; PhD, 1994, University of Florida
- Thesis: A Consumer-brand relationship framework for strategic brand management (1994)

Academic work
- Institutions: Questrom School of Business; Harvard Business School
- Main interests: Brand relationship

Susan M. Fournier is an American marketing professor. She is the Allen Questrom Professor in Management at Boston University and the first female dean of the Questrom School of Business. She has formerly served as Assistant Professor and Associate Professor at Harvard Business School from 1994 to 2003.

== Early life and education ==
Fournier was raised in Woburn, Massachusetts to working-class parents. Her father led a machine shop and her mother waited tables and bartended on weekends. She was the first person in her family to enroll in college when she began majoring in computer science at the University of Massachusetts Amherst. She eventually changed her major to marketing and earned Bachelor of Science in Business Administration from Isenberg School of Management at University of Massachusetts Amherst in 1980. She later earned Master of Science in marketing at Pennsylvania State University in 1983. Fournier used her master's degree to earn a position as a marketing researcher at Polaroid and Yankelovich Clancy Shulman before returning to school for her PhD in marketing at the University of Florida.

== Career ==
Fournier spent over a decade in the marketing industry: twelve years on the Board of Advisors for the Harley Owners Group at Harley-Davidson Motor Company and seven years as a brand advisor to Irving Oil Corporation. On August 27, 2018, Fournier became the first female dean of the Questrom School of Business. During the COVID-19 pandemic, she was recognized among the 11 marketing scholars named Marketing Science Institute Academic Fellows. The following year, she was recognized as a top performer in terms of research impact in a published study conducted by Stanford University. She later became the recipient of the 2021 Distinguished Scientific Contribution Award from the Society of Consumer Psychology.

== Selected publications ==
- Building brand community on the Harley-Davidson Posse Ride (2000)
- Consumer-brand relationships: theory and practice (2012)
- Strong brands strong relationships (2015)
