= Jay Cashman =

American construction company

Jay Cashman, Inc.
- Company type: Private
- Industry: Construction, Energy & Real Estate
- Founded: 1969
- Headquarters: Quincy, Massachusetts
- Key people: Jay Cashman (Founder & Chairman of the Board)
- Number of employees: 1000
- Subsidiaries: Cashman Dredging & Marine Contracting Co. Patriot Renewables; Preload International; IPC Lydon; Sterling Equipment & Kilkea Castle
- Website: jaycashman.com

Jay Cashman, Inc. is a privately held multi-disciplinary construction and development company, founded and owned by Jay M. Cashman. It is one of the largest privately held contracting firms in the northeastern United States. The company has moved offices several times within the Boston area and has offices in three states and India. As of 2006, the company had approximately 1,000 employees. The company was one of the major contractors on Boston's Central Artery/Tunnel Project. In 2004, the company took over financial management of a competing firm, Modern Continental Construction, at the request of Modern Continental's bondholders; the company does not, however, have an ownership stake in Modern Continental.

In 2011, Jay Cashman, Inc. purchased Kilkea Castle, one of the oldest inhabited castles in Ireland, just one hour from Dublin. Following a renovation, the hotel reopened in 2017.

The firm is also involved in the dredging business and other marine construction projects, and owns marine-equipment leasing company, Sterling Equipment. A subsidiary, Patriot Renewables, is the developer of a proposed wind farm in Buzzards Bay, South Coast Wind.

Jay Cashman, the company's founder and chairman of the board is a 1975 graduate of the Boston University School of Management. He received the school's Alumni Award for Distinguished Service in 2004. He is married to Christy Scott Cashman.
