= John Svenson =

Australian rules footballer

Personal information
- Full name: John Svenson
- Born: 8 June 1931 (age 95)
- Original team: Murchison
- Height: 183 cm (6 ft 0 in)
- Weight: 82 kg (181 lb)
- Position: Full Forward

Playing career^{1}
Years	Club	Games (Goals)
1953, 1957–59	South Melbourne	36 (16)
- ^{1} Playing statistics correct to the end of 1959.

John Svenson (born 8 June 1931) is a former Australian rules footballer who played with South Melbourne in the Victorian Football League (VFL).
