= Don McGrath =

Australian rules footballer, born 1914

Personal information
- Full name: Donald Windsor McGrath
- Born: 13 June 1914; Broken Hill, New South Wales
- Died: 8 June 2001 (aged 86)
- Original team: Broken Hill West
- Height: 175 cm (5 ft 9 in)
- Weight: 75 kg (165 lb)

Playing career^{1}
Years	Club	Games (Goals)
1941	St Kilda	11 (1)
- ^{1} Playing statistics correct to the end of 1941.

Donald Windsor McGrath (13 June 1914 – 8 June 2001) was an Australian rules footballer who played with St Kilda in the Victorian Football League (VFL).

McGrath enlisted in the Royal Australian Air Force in July 1940, serving both in Australia and in New Guinea until the end of World War II.
