= Big Dig =

1991–2007 megaproject in Boston, Massachusetts

Central Artery/Tunnel Project
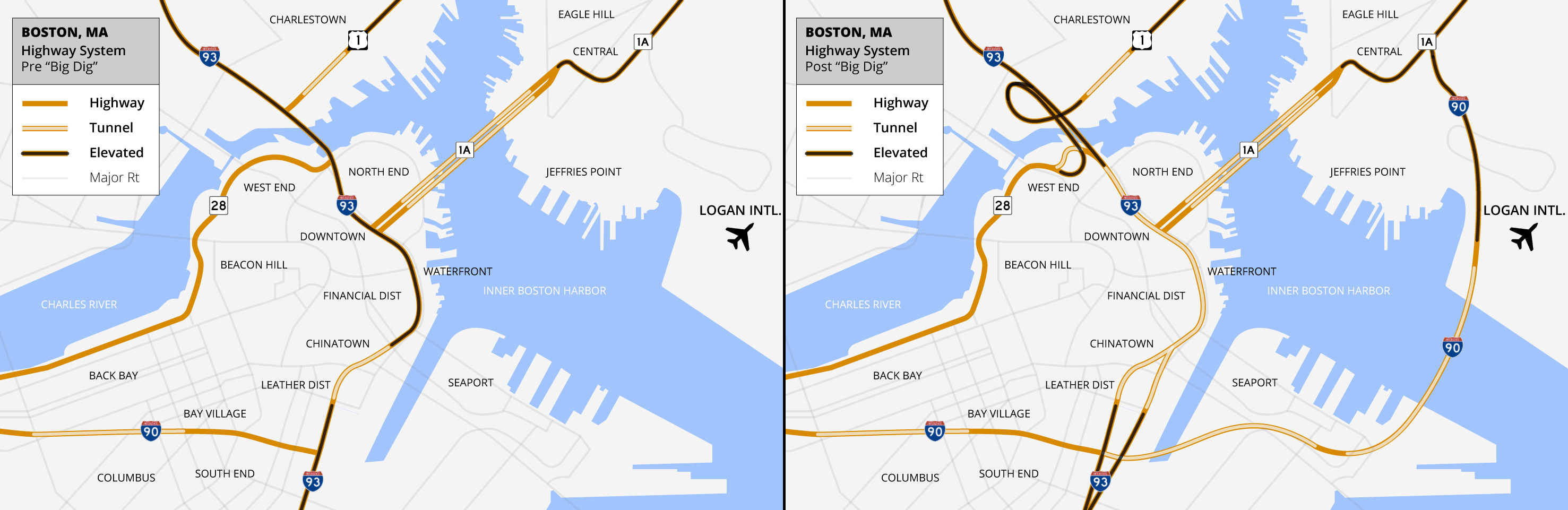
- Boston's highway system before and after the Central Artery/Tunnel Project
- Interactive map of Central Artery/Tunnel Project

Overview
- Other names: The Big Dig; CA/T Project
- Location: Boston, Massachusetts, United States
- Coordinates: 42.36197°N 71.05562°W
- Route: I-90 / I-93 / US 1 / Route 3

Operation
- Work began: 1982
- Constructed: 1991–2007
- Opened: 2003; 23 years ago
- Traffic: Automotive

The Big Dig was a megaproject in Boston that rerouted the elevated Central Artery of Interstate 93 into the O'Neill Tunnel and built the Ted Williams Tunnel to extend Interstate 90 to Logan International Airport. Those two projects were the origin of the official name, the Central Artery/Tunnel Project (CA/T Project). The megaproject constructed the Zakim Bunker Hill Bridge over the Charles River, created the Rose Kennedy Greenway in the space vacated by the previous elevated roadway and funded more than a dozen projects to improve the region's public transportation system. Planning began in 1982 and construction was carried out between 1991 and 2006. The project concluded in December 2007.

The project's general contractor was Bechtel, with Parsons Brinckerhoff as the engineers, who worked as a consortium, both overseen by the Massachusetts Highway Department. The Big Dig was the most expensive highway project in the United States, and was plagued by cost overruns, delays, leaks, design flaws, accusations of poor execution and use of substandard materials, criminal charges and arrests, and the death of one motorist.

The project was originally scheduled to be completed in 1998 at an estimated cost of $2.8 billion. The project was completed in December 2007 at $14.6 billion. As a result of a death, leaks, and other design flaws, the Parsons Brinckerhoff and Bechtel consortium agreed to pay $407 million in restitution, and several smaller companies agreed to pay a combined sum of approximately $51 million.

== Origin ==
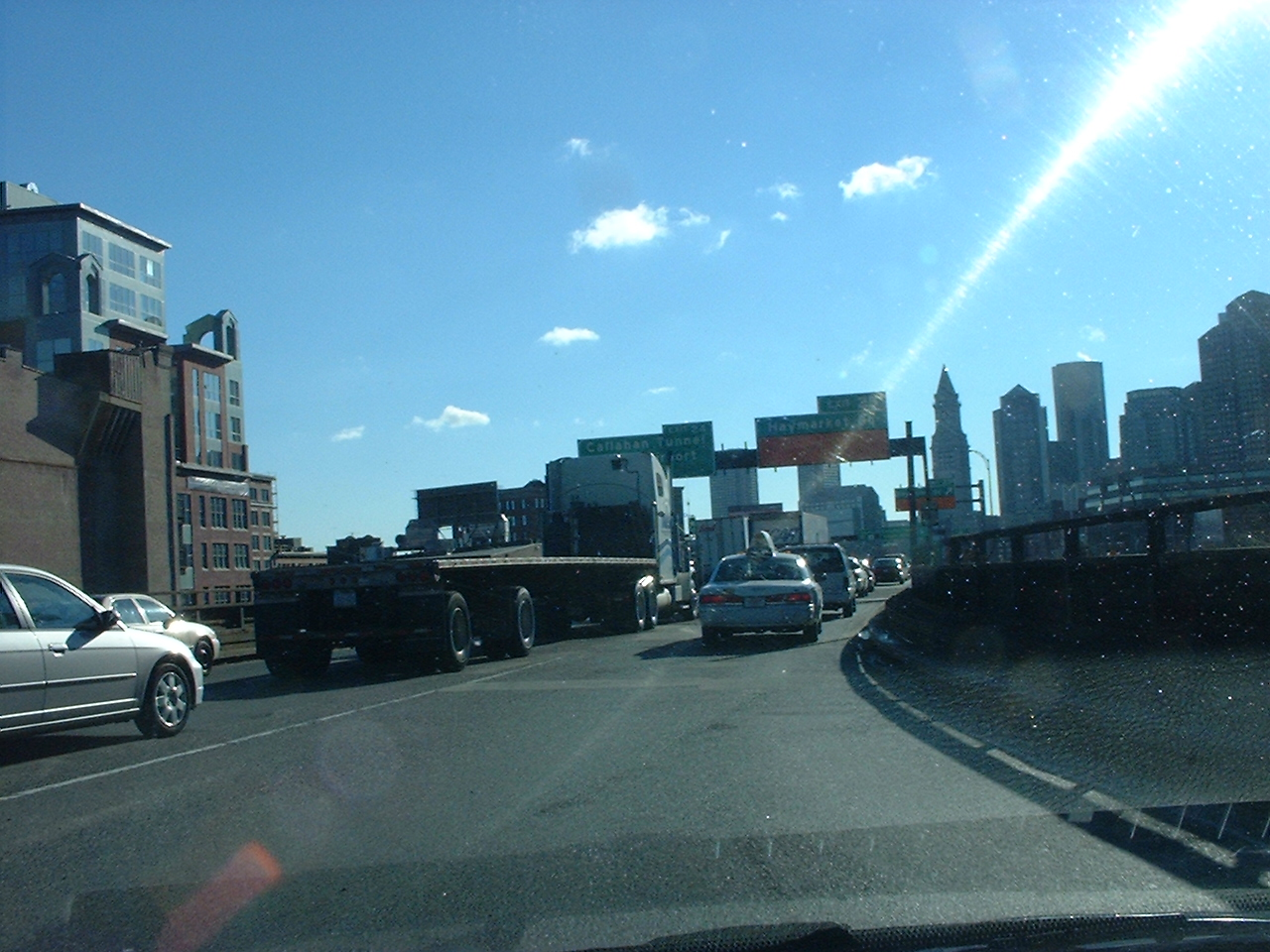
Traffic on the old, elevated Central Artery at midday, 2003

This project was developed in response to the persistent and growing problem of traffic congestion on Boston's historically tangled and narrow streets, many of which were laid out centuries before the invention of the automobile. The layout, originally designed for horse-drawn carriages and pedestrian traffic, was never intended to accommodate modern vehicles, leading to chronic bottlenecks and delays that frustrated commuters and residents alike. As early as 1930, the city's Planning Board recognized the urgent need to address these traffic issues and recommended the construction of a raised express highway running north–south through the downtown district. The goal was to create a faster, more direct route that would allow through-traffic to bypass the congested city streets, reducing travel times and improving the flow of vehicles throughout the area.

Building on these early recommendations, Commissioner of Public Works William Callahan actively promoted detailed plans for what would become the Central Artery, an elevated expressway designed to run between the downtown district and the waterfront. The project was envisioned as a major infrastructure improvement that could transform urban mobility in Boston by separating local traffic from longer-distance through-traffic. Ultimately, the elevated expressway was constructed according to these plans, dramatically altering the cityscape while addressing some of the long-standing traffic challenges. Its development marked a pivotal moment in Boston's urban planning history, reflecting both the ambitions of city planners to modernize the transportation system and the broader nationwide trend during the mid-20th century toward building elevated highways through urban centers.

In the 1950s, Governor John Volpe interceded to change the design of the last section of the Central Artery, putting it underground through the Dewey Square Tunnel. While traffic moved somewhat better, the other problems remained. There was chronic congestion on the Central Artery (I-93), the elevated six-lane highway through the center of downtown Boston, which was, in the words of Pete Sigmund, "like a funnel full of slowly-moving, or stopped, cars (and swearing motorists)."

In 1959, the 1.5-mile-long (2.4-kilometer) road section carried approximately 75,000 vehicles a day. By the 1990s, this had grown to 190,000 vehicles a day. Traffic jams of 16 hours were predicted for 2010.

The expressway had tight turns, an excessive number of entrances and exits, entrance ramps without merge lanes, and as the decades passed and other planned expressways were cancelled, continually escalating vehicular traffic that was well beyond its design capacity. Local businesses again wanted relief, city leaders sought a reuniting of the waterfront with the city, and nearby residents desired removal of the matte green-painted elevated road, which mayor Thomas Menino called Boston's "other Green Monster", as an unfavorable comparison to Fenway Park's famed left-field wall. MIT engineers Bill Reynolds, and eventual state Secretary of Transportation Frederick P. Salvucci envisioned moving the whole expressway underground.

=== Cancellation of the Inner Belt project ===
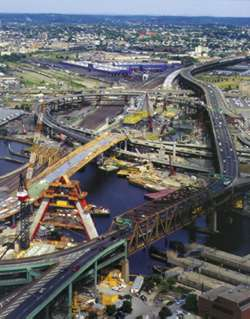
The Zakim Bunker Hill Bridge over the Charles River under construction, looking north. The old elevated Central Artery crossing is to the right.

Another important motivation for the final form of the Big Dig was the abandonment of the Massachusetts Department of Public Works' intended expressway system through and around Boston. The Central Artery, as part of Mass. DPW's Master Plan of 1948, was originally planned to be the downtown Boston stretch of Interstate 95, and was signed as such. A bypass road called the Inner Belt, was subsequently renamed Interstate 695. The law establishing the Interstate highway system was enacted in 1956.

The Inner Belt District was to pass to the west of the downtown core, through the neighborhood of Roxbury and the cities of Brookline, Cambridge, and Somerville. Earlier controversies over impact of the Boston extension of the Massachusetts Turnpike, particularly on the heavily populated neighborhood of Brighton, and the additional large amount of housing that would have had to be destroyed, led to massive community opposition to both the Inner Belt and the Boston section of I-95.

By 1970, building demolition and land clearances had been completed along the I-95 right of way through the neighborhoods of Roxbury, Jamaica Plain, the South End and Roslindale. This led to secession threats by Hyde Park, Boston's youngest and southernmost neighborhood, which I-95 was also slated to go through. By 1972, with relatively little work done on the Southwest Corridor portion of I-95 and none on the potentially massively disruptive Inner Belt, Governor Francis Sargent put a moratorium on highway construction within the Route 128 corridor, except for the final short stretch of Interstate 93. In 1974, the remainder of the Master Plan was canceled.

With ever-increasing traffic volumes funneled onto I-93 alone, the Central Artery became chronically gridlocked. The Sargent moratorium led to the rerouting of I-95 away from Boston around the Route 128 beltway, and the conversion of the cleared land in the southern part of the city into the Southwest Corridor linear park, and a new right-of-way for the Orange Line subway and Amtrak. Parts of the planned I-695 right-of-way remain unused and under consideration for future mass-transit projects.

The original 1948 Master Plan included a Third Harbor Tunnel plan that was hugely controversial in its own right, because it would have disrupted the Maverick Square area of East Boston. It was never built.

=== Mixing of traffic ===
A major reason for the all-day congestion was that the Central Artery carried north–south traffic and east–west traffic. Boston's Logan Airport lies across Boston Harbor in East Boston. Before the Big Dig, the only access to the airport from downtown was through the paired Callahan and Sumner tunnels. Traffic on the major highways from west of Boston—the Massachusetts Turnpike and Storrow Drive—mostly traveled on portions of the Central Artery to reach these tunnels. Getting between the Central Artery and the tunnels involved short diversions onto city streets, increasing local congestion.

=== Mass transit ===
A number of public transportation projects were included as part of an environmental mitigation for the Big Dig. The most expensive was the building of the Phase II Silver Line tunnel under Fort Point Channel, done in coordination with Big Dig construction. Silver Line buses now use this tunnel and the Ted Williams Tunnel to link South Station and Logan Airport.

Construction of the MBTA Green Line extension beyond Lechmere to Medford/Tufts station opened in December 2022. As of 2026, promised projects to connect the Red and Blue subway lines, and to restore the Green Line streetcar service to the Arborway in Jamaica Plain have not been completed. The Red and Blue subway line connection underwent initial design, but no funding has been designated for the project. The Arborway Line restoration has been abandoned, following a final court decision in 2011.

The original Big Dig plan included the North-South Rail Link, which would have connected North and South Stations, the major passenger train stations in Boston. This aspect of the project was dropped by the state transportation administration early in the Dukakis administration. Negotiations with the federal government had led to an agreement to widen some of the lanes in the new harbor tunnel, and accommodating these would require the tunnel to be deeper and mechanically vented. This left no room for the rail lines. Diesel trains, then in use, passing through the tunnel would have substantially increased the cost of the ventilation system.

== Early planning ==
The project was conceived in the 1970s by the Boston Transportation Planning Review to replace the rusting elevated six-lane Central Artery. The expressway separated downtown from the waterfront, and was increasingly choked with bumper-to-bumper traffic. Business leaders were more concerned about access to Logan Airport, and pushed instead for a third harbor tunnel.

In 1982, planning for the Big Dig as a project officially began. In 1983, environmental impact studies started. In 1987, after years of extensive lobbying for federal dollars, a public works bill appropriating funding for the Big Dig was passed by the US Congress, but it was vetoed by President Ronald Reagan for being too expensive. When Congress overrode the veto, the project had its green light. In 1991, ground was first broken.

In 1997, the state legislature created the Metropolitan Highway System and transferred responsibility for the Central Artery and Tunnel "CA/T" Project from the Massachusetts Highway Department and the Massachusetts Governor's Office to the Massachusetts Turnpike Authority (MTA). The MTA, which had little experience in managing an undertaking of the scope and magnitude of the CA/T Project, hired a joint venture to provide preliminary designs, manage design consultants and construction contractors, track the project's cost and schedule, advise MTA on project decisions, and, in some instances, act as the MTA's representative. Eventually, MTA combined some of its employees with joint venture employees in an integrated project organization. This was intended to make management more efficient, but it hindered MTA's ability to independently oversee project activities because MTA and the joint venture had effectively become partners in the project.

== Obstacles ==
In addition to political and financial difficulties, the project received resistance from residents of Boston's historic North End, who in the 1950s had seen 20% of the neighborhood's businesses displaced by development of the Central Artery. In 1993, the North End Waterfront Central Artery Committee (NEWCAC) was created, co-founded by Nancy Caruso, representing residents, businesses, and institutions in the North End and Waterfront neighborhoods of Boston. The NEWCAC Committee's goal included lessening the impact of the Central Artery/Tunnel Project on the community, representing the neighborhoods to government agencies, keeping the community informed, developing a list of priorities of immediate neighborhood concerns, and promoting responsible and appropriate development of the post-construction artery corridor in the North End and Waterfront neighborhoods.

The political, financial and residential obstacles were magnified when several environmental and engineering obstacles occurred. The downtown area through which the tunnels were to be dug was largely land fill, and included existing Red Line and Blue Line subway tunnels as well as innumerable pipes and utility lines that would have to be replaced or moved. Tunnel workers encountered many unexpected geological and archaeological barriers, ranging from glacial debris to foundations of buried houses and a number of sunken ships lying within the reclaimed land.

The project received approval from state environmental agencies in 1991, after satisfying concerns including release of toxins by the excavation and the possibility of disrupting the homes of millions of rats, causing them to roam the streets of Boston in search of new housing. By the time the federal environmental clearances were delivered in 1994, the process had taken some seven years, during which time inflation greatly increased the project's original cost estimates.

Reworking such a busy corridor without seriously restricting traffic flow required a number of state-of-the-art construction techniques. Because the old elevated highway, which remained in operation throughout the construction process, rested on pylons located throughout the designated dig area, engineers first utilized slurry wall techniques to create 120-foot-deep (37 m) concrete walls upon which the highway could rest. These concrete walls also stabilized the sides of the site, preventing cave-ins during the continued excavation process.

The multi-lane Interstate highway also had to pass under South Station's seven railroad tracks, which carried over 40,000 commuters and 400 trains per day. To avoid multiple relocations of train lines while the tunneling advanced, as had been initially planned, a specially designed jack was constructed to support the ground and tracks to allow the excavation to take place below. Construction crews also used ground freezing (an artificial induction of permafrost) to help stabilize surrounding ground as they excavated the tunnel. This was the largest tunneling project undertaken beneath railroad lines anywhere in the world. The ground freezing enabled safer, more efficient excavation, and also assisted in environmental issues, as less contaminated fill needed to be exported than if a traditional cut-and-cover method had been applied.

Other challenges included existing subway tunnels crossing the path of the underground highway. To build slurry walls past these tunnels, it was necessary to dig beneath the tunnels and to build an underground concrete bridge to support the tunnels' weight, without interrupting rail service.

== Construction phase ==
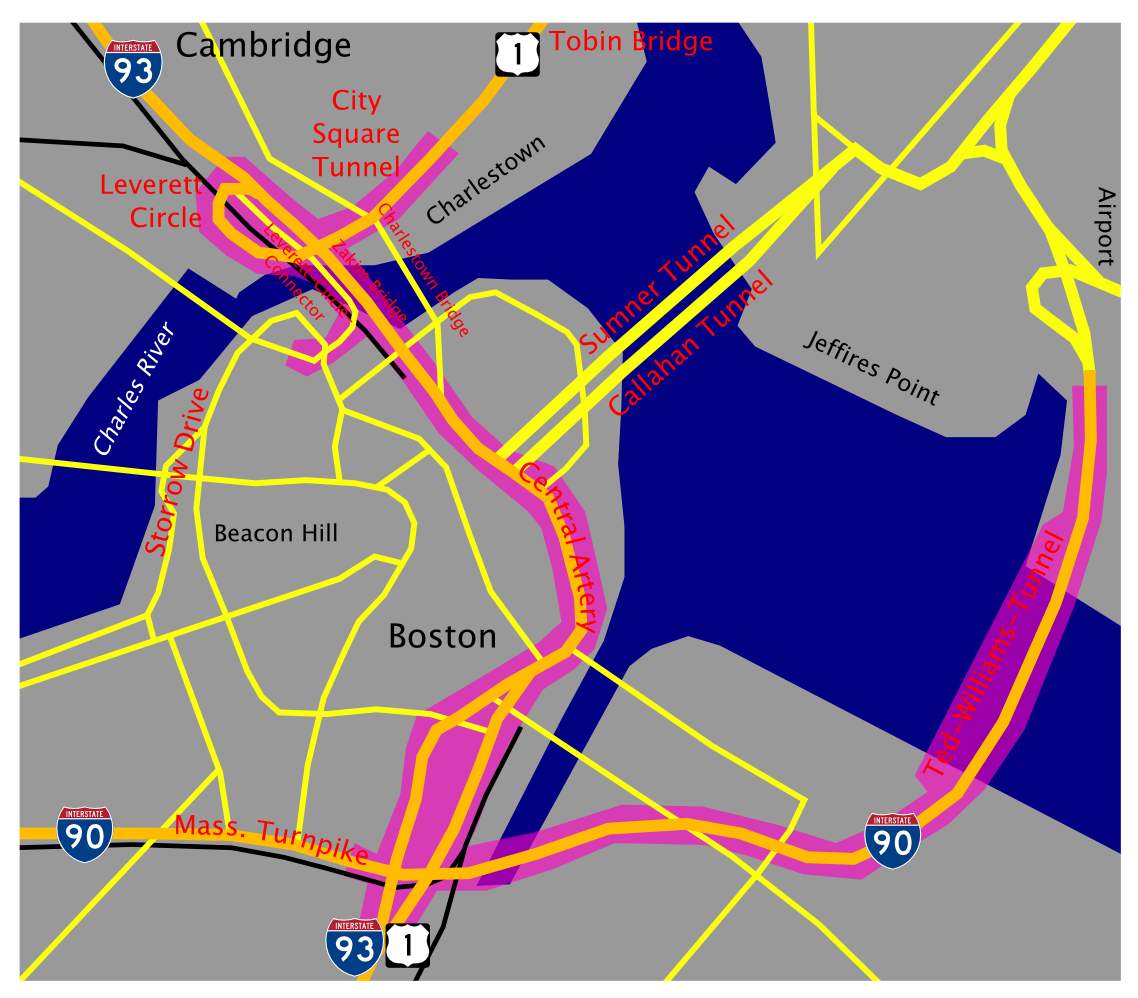
Construction sites of the "Big Dig" depicted in pink

The project was managed by the Massachusetts Turnpike Authority, with the Big Dig and the Turnpike's Boston Extension from the 1960s being financially and legally joined by the legislature as the Metropolitan Highway System. Design and construction was supervised by a joint venture of Bechtel Corporation and Parsons Brinckerhoff. Because of the enormous size of the project—too large for any company to undertake alone—the design and construction of the Big Dig was broken up into dozens of smaller subprojects with well-defined interfaces between contractors. Major heavy-construction contractors on the project included Jay Cashman, Modern Continental, Obayashi Corporation, Perini Corporation, Peter Kiewit Sons' Incorporated, J. F. White, and the Slattery division of Skanska USA. Of those, Modern Continental was awarded the greatest gross value of contracts, joint ventures included.

Construction Status by contract number as of January 1, 2004

The nature of the Charles River crossing had been a source of major controversy throughout the design phase of the project. Many environmental advocates preferred a river crossing entirely in tunnels, but this, along with 27 other plans, was rejected as too costly. With a deadline looming to begin construction on a separate project that would connect the Tobin Bridge to the Charles River crossing, Salvucci overrode the objections and chose a variant of the plan known as "Scheme Z". This plan was considered to be reasonably cost-effective, but had the drawback of requiring highway ramps stacked up as high as 100 feet (30 m) immediately adjacent to the Charles River.

The city of Cambridge objected to the visual impact of the chosen Charles River crossing design. The city sued to revoke the project's environmental certificate and forced the project planners to redesign the river crossing again.

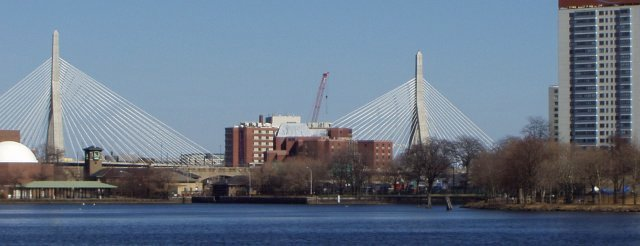
The Leonard P. Zakim Bridge

Swiss engineer Christian Menn took over the design of the bridge. He suggested a cradle cable-stayed bridge that would carry ten lanes of traffic. The plan was accepted and construction began on the Leonard P. Zakim Bunker Hill Memorial Bridge. The bridge employed an asymmetrical design and a hybrid of steel and concrete was used to construct it. The distinctive bridge, designed by Boston-based architect Miguel Rosales, is supported by two forked towers connected to the span by cables and girders. It was the first bridge in the country to employ this method and it was, at the time, the widest cable-stayed bridge in the world, having since been surpassed by the Eastern span replacement of the San Francisco–Oakland Bay Bridge.

Meanwhile, construction continued on the Tobin Bridge approach. By the time all parties agreed on the I-93 design, construction of the Tobin connector, today known as the "City Square Tunnel" for a Charlestown area it bypasses, was far along, significantly adding to the cost of constructing the US Route 1 interchange and retrofitting the tunnel.

Boston blue clay and other soils extracted from the path of the tunnel were used to cap many local landfills, fill in the Granite Rail Quarry in Quincy, and restore the surface of Spectacle Island in the Boston Harbor Islands National Recreation Area.

The Storrow Drive Connector, a companion bridge to the Zakim, began carrying traffic from I-93 to Storrow Drive in 1999. The project had been under consideration for years, but was opposed by the wealthy residents of the Beacon Hill neighborhood. It was finally accepted because it would funnel traffic bound for Storrow Drive and downtown Boston away from the mainline roadway. The Connector ultimately used a pair of ramps that had been constructed for Interstate 695, enabling the mainline I-93 to carry more traffic that would have used I-695 under the original Master Plan.

When construction began, the project cost, including the Charles River crossing, was estimated at $5.8 billion. Eventual cost overruns were so high that the chairman of the Massachusetts Turnpike Authority, James Kerasiotes, was fired in 2000. His replacement had to commit to an $8.55 billion cap on federal contributions. The total expenses eventually passed $15 billion. Interest brought this cost to $21.93 billion.

=== Engineering methods and details ===
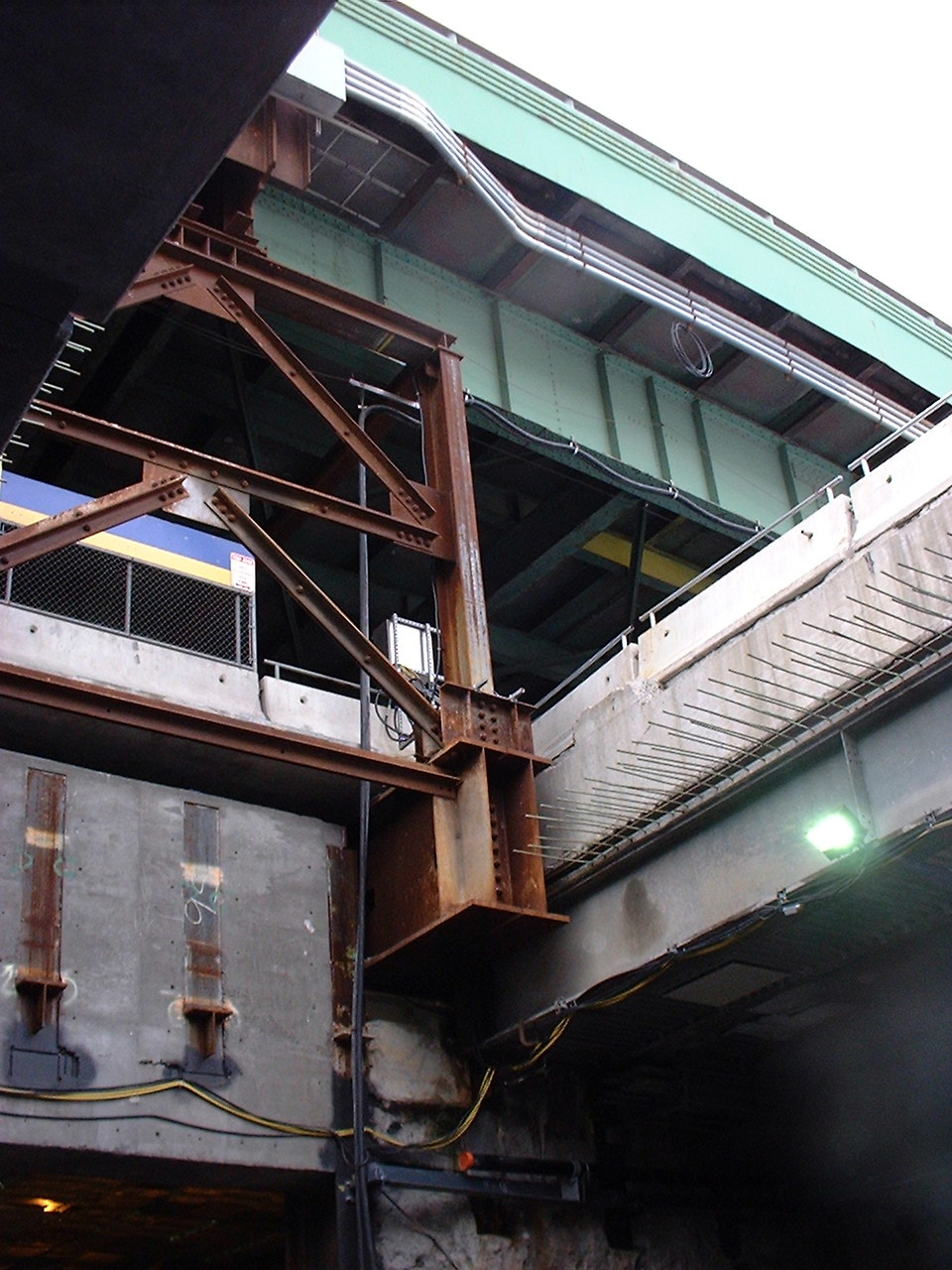
Temporary supports hold up the elevated Central Artery during construction.

Several unusual engineering challenges arose during the project, requiring unusual solutions and methods to address them. At the beginning of the project, engineers had to figure out the safest way to build the tunnel without endangering the existing elevated highway above. Eventually, they created horizontal braces as wide as the tunnel, then cut away the elevated highway's struts, and shifted its weight onto the new braces.

Three alternative construction methods were studied with their corresponding structural design to address existing conditions, safety measures, and constructability. In addition to codified loads, construction loads were computed to support final design and field execution.

== Final phases ==
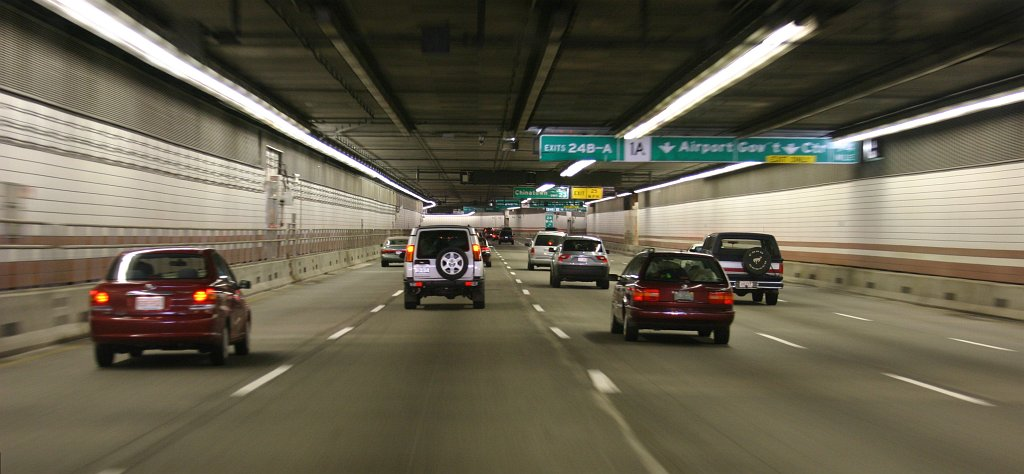
The Interstate 93 tunnel

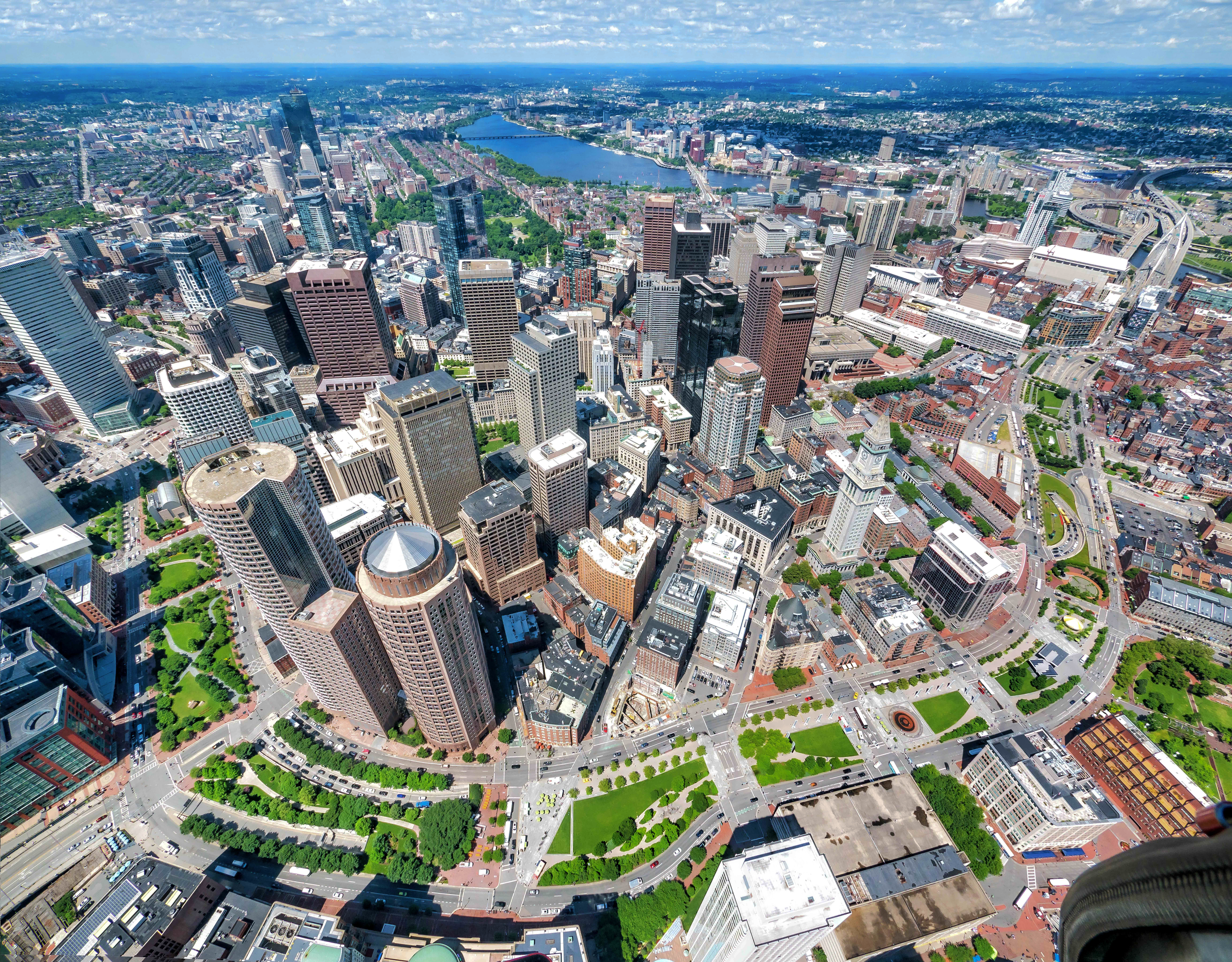
The Rose Kennedy Greenway

On January 18, 2003, the opening ceremony was held for the I-90 Connector Tunnel, extending the Massachusetts Turnpike (Interstate 90) east into the Ted Williams Tunnel, and onwards to Boston Logan International Airport. The Ted Williams tunnel had been completed and was in limited use for commercial traffic and high-occupancy vehicles since late 1995. The westbound lanes opened on the afternoon of January 18 and the eastbound lanes on January 19.

The northbound lanes of the I-93 tunnel opened on March 29, 2003. A temporary ramp from I-90 westbound to I-93 southbound opened on December 6, 2003, as did Cross Street on the surface. The southbound lanes of the I-93 tunnel opened on December 20, 2003. A tunnel underneath Leverett Circle connecting eastbound Storrow Drive to I-93 North and the Tobin Bridge opened December 19, 2004, easing congestion at the circle. All southbound lanes of I-93 opened to traffic on March 5, 2005, including the left lane of the Zakim Bridge, and all of the refurbished Dewey Square Tunnel.

By the end of December 2004, 95% of the Big Dig was completed. Major construction remained on the surface, including construction of final ramp configurations in the North End and in the South Bay interchange, and reconstruction of the surface streets.

The final ramp downtown – exit 16A (formerly 20B) from I-93 south to Albany Street – opened January 13, 2006.

In 2006, the two Interstate 93 tunnels were dedicated as the Thomas P. O'Neill Jr. Tunnel, after the former Democratic speaker of the House of Representatives from Massachusetts who pushed to have the Big Dig funded by the federal government.

== Coordinated projects ==
The Commonwealth of Massachusetts was required under the Federal Clean Air Act to mitigate air pollution generated by the highway improvements. Secretary of Transportation Fred Salvucci signed an agreement with the Conservation Law Foundation in 1990 enumerating 14 specific projects the state agreed to build. This list was affirmed in a 1992 lawsuit settlement.

Projects which have been completed include:

- Restoration of three Old Colony commuter rail lines (Middleborough/Lakeville Line, Plymouth/Kingston Line, and Greenbush Line)
- Expansion of Framingham Line to serve Worcester full-time
- Restoration of the Newburyport/Rockport Line
- Six-car trains on the MBTA Blue Line, requiring platform lengthening, station modernization, and all new train cars
- MBTA Silver Line, a bus rapid transit route to the South Boston waterfront and East Boston, including the airport
- 1,000 new commuter parking spaces
- Fairmount Line improvements
- Green Line Extension

However, some projects were removed:

- Design of the Red-Blue Connector
- Restoration of Green Line E branch service to Arborway

=== Surface treatments ===
Some surface treatments that were part of the original project plan were dropped due to the massive cost overruns on the highway portion of the project.

$99.1 million was allocated for mitigating improvements to the Charles River Basin, including the construction of North Point Park in Cambridge and Paul Revere Park in Charlestown. The North Bank Bridge, providing pedestrian and bicycle connectivity between the parks, was not funded until the American Recovery and Reinvestment Act of 2009. Nashua Street Park on the Boston side was completed in 2003, by McCourt Construction with $7.9 million in funding from MassDOT.

As of 2017, $30.5 million had been transferred to the Massachusetts Department of Conservation and Recreation to complete five projects. Another incomplete but required project is the South Bank Bridge over the MBTA Commuter Rail tracks at North Station (connecting Nashua Street Park to the proposed South Bank Park, which is currently a parking lot under the Zakim Bridge at the Charles River locks).

Improvements in the lower Charles River Basin include the new walkway at Lovejoy Wharf (constructed by the developer of 160 North Washington Street, the new headquarters of Converse), the Lynch Family Skate Park (constructed in 2015 by the Charles River Conservancy), rehabilitation of historic operations buildings for the Charles River Dam and lock, a maintenance facility, and a planned pedestrian walkway across the Charles River next to the MBTA Commuter Rail drawbridge at North Station (connecting Nashua Street Park and North Point Park). MassDOT is funding the South Bank Park, and replacement of the North Washington Street Bridge (construction Aug 2018–23).

EF Education is funding public greenspace improvements as part of its three-phase expansion at North Point. Remaining funding may be used to construct the North Point Inlet pedestrian bridge, and a pedestrian walkway over Leverett Circle. Before being replaced with surface access during the reconstruction of the Science Park MBTA Green Line station, Leverett Circle had pedestrian bridges with stairs that provided elevated access between the station, the Charles River Parks, and the sidewalk to the Boston Museum of Science. The replacement ramps would comply with Americans with Disabilities Act requirements and allow easy travel by wheelchair or bicycle over the busy intersection.

=== Public art ===
While not a legally mandated requirement, public art was part of the urban design planning process, and later design development work, through the Artery Arts Program. The intent of the program was to integrate public art into highway infrastructure (retaining walls, fences, and lighting) and the essential elements of the pedestrian environment (walkways, park landscape elements, and bridges). As overall project costs increased, the Artery Arts Program was seen as a potential liability, even though there was support and interest from the public and professional arts organizations in the area.

At the beginning of the highway design process, a temporary arts program was initiated, and over 50 proposals were selected. Development began on only a few projects before funding for the program was cut. Permanent public art that was funded includes: super graphic text and facades of former West End houses cast into the concrete elevated highway abutment support walls near North Station by artist Sheila Levrant de Bretteville; Harbor Fog, a sensor-activated mist, light and sound sculptural environment by artist Ross Miller in parcel 17; a historical sculpture celebrating the 18th and 19th century shipbuilding industry and a bust of shipbuilder Donald McKay in East Boston; blue interior lighting of the Zakim Bridge; and the Miller's River Littoral Way walkway and lighting under the loop ramps north of the Charles River.

Extensive landscape planting, as well as a maintenance program to support the plantings, was requested by many community members during public meetings.

== Impact on traffic ==
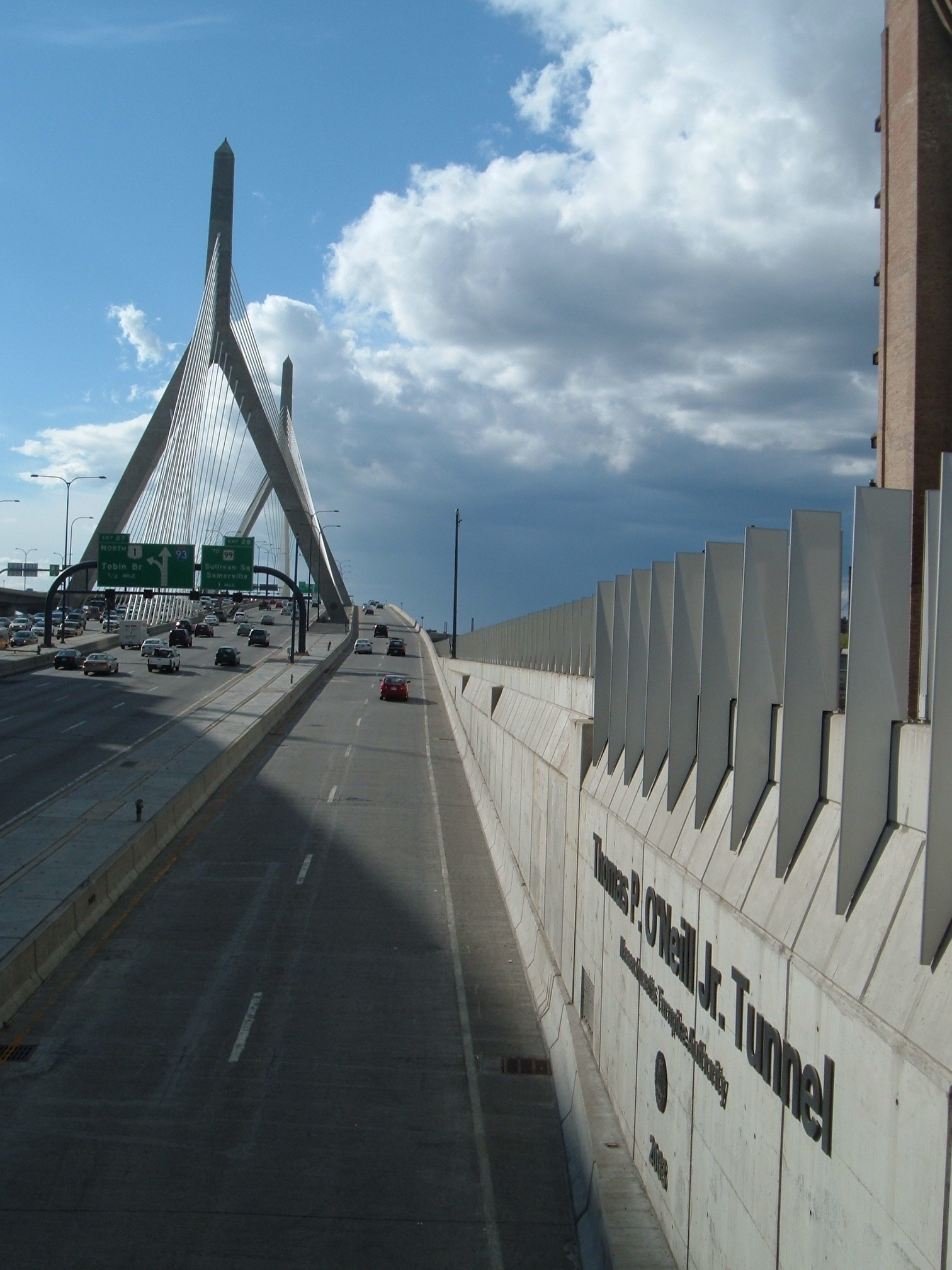
Traffic exiting the Thomas P. O'Neill Jr. Tunnel onto the Zakim Bridge

The Big Dig separated the co-mingled traffic from the Massachusetts Turnpike and the Sumner and Callahan tunnels. While only one net lane in each direction was added to the north–south I-93, several new east–west lanes became available. East–west traffic on the Massachusetts Turnpike/I-90 now proceeds directly through the Ted Williams Tunnel to Logan Airport and Route 1A beyond. Traffic between Storrow Drive and the Callahan and Sumner Tunnels still uses a short portion of I-93, but additional lanes and direct connections are provided for this traffic.

The result was a 62% reduction in vehicle hours of travel on I-93, the airport tunnels, and the connection from Storrow Drive, from an average 38,200 hours per day before construction (1994–1995) to 14,800 hours per day in 2004–2005, after the project was largely complete. The savings for travelers was estimated at $166 million annually in the same 2004–2005 time frame. Travel times on the Central Artery northbound during the afternoon peak hour were reduced 85.6%.

A 2008 Boston Globe report asserted that waiting time for the majority of trips actually increased as a result of demand induced by the increased road capacity. Because more drivers were opting to use the new roads, traffic bottlenecks were only pushed outward from the city, not reduced or eliminated (although some trips are now faster). The report states, "Ultimately, many motorists going to and from the suburbs at peak rush hours are spending more time stuck in traffic, not less." The Globe also asserted that their analysis provides a fuller picture of the traffic situation than a state-commissioned study done two years earlier, in which the Big Dig was credited with helping to save at least $167 million a year by increasing economic productivity and decreasing motor vehicle operating costs. That study did not look at highways outside the Big Dig construction area and did not take into account new congestion elsewhere.

== Impact on property values ==
Towards the end of the Big Dig in 2003, it was estimated that the demolition of the Central Artery highway would cause a $732 million increase in property value in Boston's financial district, with the replacement parks providing an additional $252 million in value. As a result of the Big Dig, a large amount of waterfront space was opened up, which is now a high-rent residential and commercial area called the Seaport District. The development of Seaport alone was estimated to create $7 billion in private investment and 43,000 jobs.

== Operations Control Center (OCC) ==
As part of the project, an elaborate Operations Control Center (OCC) control room was constructed in South Boston. Staffed on a "24/7/365" basis, this center monitors and reports on traffic congestion, and responds to emergencies. Continuous video surveillance is provided by hundreds of cameras, and thousands of sensors monitor traffic speed and density, air quality, water levels, temperatures, equipment status, and other conditions inside the tunnel. The OCC can activate emergency ventilation fans, change electronic display signs, and dispatch service crews when necessary.

== Problems ==
=== Leaks ===
As far back as 2001, Turnpike Authority officials and contractors knew of thousands of leaks in ceiling and wall fissures, extensive water damage to steel supports and fireproofing systems, and overloaded drainage systems. Many of the leaks were a result of Modern Continental and other subcontractors failing to remove gravel and other debris before pouring concrete. This information was not made public until engineers at MIT (volunteer students and professors) performed several experiments and found serious problems with the tunnel.

On September 15, 2004, a major leak in the I-93 north tunnel forced the closure of the tunnel while repairs were conducted. This also forced the Turnpike Authority to release information regarding its non-disclosure of prior leaks. A follow-up reported on "extensive" leaks that were more severe than state authorities had previously acknowledged. The report went on to state that the tunnel system had more than 400 leaks. A Boston Globe report countered that by stating there were nearly 700 leaks in a single 1,000-foot (300 m) section of tunnel beneath South Station. Turnpike officials also stated that the number of leaks being investigated was down from 1,000 to 500.

The problem of leaks is further aggravated by the fact that many of them involve corrosive salt water. This is caused by the proximity of Boston Harbor and the Atlantic Ocean, causing a mix of salt and fresh water leaks in the tunnel. The situation is made worse by road salt spread in the tunnel to melt ice during freezing weather, or brought in by vehicles passing through. Salt water and salt spray are well-known issues that must be dealt with in any marine environment. It has been reported that "hundreds of thousands of gallons of salt water are pumped out monthly" in the Big Dig, and a map has been prepared showing "hot spots" where water leakage is especially serious. Salt-accelerated corrosion has caused ceiling light fixtures to fail (see below), but can also cause rapid deterioration of embedded rebar and other structural steel reinforcements holding the tunnel walls and ceiling in place.

=== Substandard materials ===
Massachusetts State Police searched the offices of Aggregate Industries, the largest concrete supplier for the underground portions of the project, in June 2005. They seized evidence that Aggregate delivered concrete that did not meet contract specifications. In March 2006 Massachusetts Attorney General Tom Reilly announced plans to sue project contractors and others because of poor work on the project. Over 200 complaints were filed by the state of Massachusetts as a result of leaks, cost overruns, quality concerns, and safety violations. In total, the state has sought approximately $100 million from the contractors ($1 for every $141 spent).

In May 2006, six employees of the company were arrested and charged with conspiracy to defraud the United States. The employees were accused of reusing old concrete and double-billing loads. In July 2007, Aggregate Industries settled the case with an agreement to pay $50 million. $42 million of the settlement went to civil cases and $8 million was paid in criminal fines. The company will provide $75 million in insurance for maintenance as well as pay $500,000 toward routine checks on areas suspected to contain substandard concrete.

In July 2009, two of the accused, Gerard McNally and Keith Thomas, both managers, pled guilty to charges of conspiracy, mail fraud, and filing false reports. The following month, the remaining four, Robert Prosperi, Mark Blais, Gregory Stevenson, and John Farrar, were found guilty on conspiracy and fraud charges. The four were sentenced to probation and home confinement and Blais and Farrar were additionally sentenced to community service.

=== Fatal ceiling collapse ===
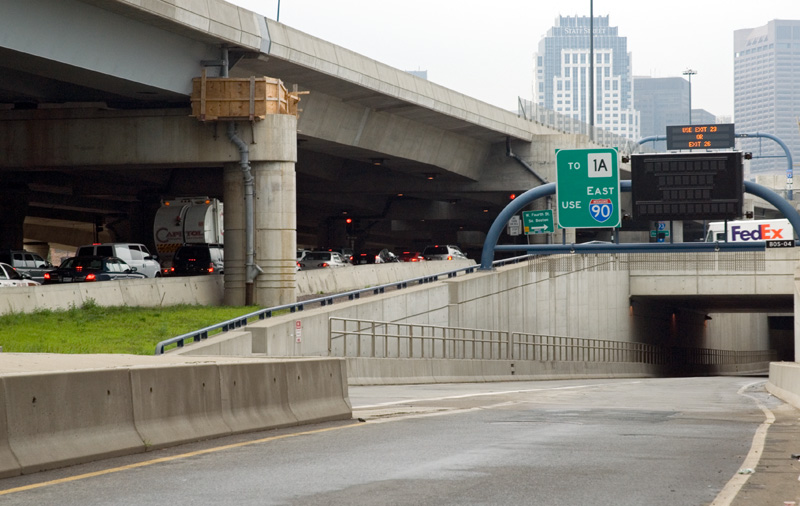
Boston traffic crawls over a closed Ted Williams Tunnel entrance in Boston during rush hour on July 11, 2006, the day after the collapse.

A fatal accident raised safety questions and closed part of the project for most of the summer of 2006. On July 10, 2006, concrete ceiling panels and debris weighing 26 short tons (24 tonnes) and measuring 20 by 40 ft (6.1 by 12.2 m) fell on a car traveling on the two-lane ramp connecting northbound I-93 to eastbound I-90 in South Boston, killing Milena Del Valle, who was a passenger, and injuring her husband, Angel Del Valle, who was driving.

Immediately following the fatal ceiling collapse, Governor Mitt Romney ordered a "stem-to-stern" safety audit conducted by the engineering firm of Wiss, Janney, Elstner Associates, Inc. to look for additional areas of risk. Said Romney: "We simply cannot live in a setting where a project of this scale has the potential of threatening human life, as has already been seen".

The collapse and closure of the tunnel greatly snarled traffic in the city. The resulting traffic jams are cited as contributing to the death of another person, a heart attack victim who died en route to Boston Medical Center when his ambulance was caught in one such traffic jam two weeks after the collapse. On September 1, 2006, one eastbound lane of the connector tunnel was re-opened to traffic.

Following extensive inspections and repairs, Interstate 90 east- and westbound lanes reopened in early January 2007. The final piece of the road network, a high occupancy vehicle lane connecting Interstate 93 north to the Ted Williams Tunnel, reopened on June 1, 2007.

On July 10, 2007, after a lengthy investigation, the National Transportation Safety Board found that epoxy glue used to hold the roof in place during construction was not appropriate for long-term bonding. This was determined to be the cause of the roof collapse. The Power-Fast Epoxy Adhesive used in the installation was designed for short-term loading, such as wind or earthquake loads, not long-term loading, such as the weight of a panel.

Powers Fasteners, the makers of the adhesive, revised their product specifications on May 15, 2007, to increase the safety factor from 4 to 10 for all of their epoxy products intended for use in overhead applications. The safety factor on Power-Fast Epoxy was increased from 4 to 16. On December 24, 2007, the Del Valle family announced they had reached a settlement with Powers Fasteners that would pay the family $6 million. In December 2008, Powers Fasteners agreed to pay $16 million to the state to settle manslaughter charges.

=== "Ginsu guardrails" ===
Public safety workers have called the walkway safety handrails in the Big Dig tunnels "Ginsu guardrails", because the squared-off edges of the support posts have caused mutilations and deaths of passengers ejected from crashed vehicles. After an eighth reported death involving the safety handrails, MassDOT officials announced plans to cover or remove the allegedly dangerous fixtures, but only near curves or exit ramps. This partial removal of hazards has been criticized by a safety specialist, who suggests that the handrails are just as dangerous in straight sections of the tunnel.

=== Lighting fixtures ===
In March 2011, it became known that senior MassDOT officials had failed to disclose an issue with the lighting fixtures in the O'Neill tunnel. In early February 2011, a maintenance crew found a fixture lying in the middle travel lane in the northbound tunnel. Assuming it to be simple road debris, the maintenance team picked it up and brought it back to its home facility. The next day, a supervisor passing through the yard realized that the 120 lb (54 kg) fixture was not road debris but was in fact one of the fixtures used to light the tunnel itself. Further investigation revealed that the fixture's mounting apparatus had failed, due to galvanic corrosion of incompatible metals, caused by having aluminum in direct contact with stainless steel, in the presence of salt water. The electrochemical potential difference between stainless steel and aluminum is in the range of 0.5 to 1.0V, depending on the exact alloys involved, and can cause considerable corrosion within months under unfavorable conditions.

After the discovery of the reason why the fixture had failed, a comprehensive inspection of the other fixtures in the tunnel revealed that numerous other fixtures were also in the same state of deterioration. Some of the worst fixtures were temporarily shored up with plastic ties. Moving forward with temporary repairs, members of the MassDOT administration team decided not to let the news of the systemic failure and repair of the fixtures be released to the public or to Governor Deval Patrick's administration.

As of April 2012, it appeared that all of the 25,000 light fixtures would have to be replaced, at an estimated cost of $54 million. The replacement work was mostly done at night, and required lane closures or occasional closing of the entire tunnel for safety, and was estimated to take up to two years to complete.

== See also ==
- Vincent Zarrilli – critic of the Big Dig who proposed the Boston Bypass
- Alaskan Way Viaduct replacement tunnel – similar project in Seattle, Washington

International:

- Carmel Tunnels – similar project in Haifa, Israel
- Central–Wan Chai Bypass – similar project in the areas of Central, Wan Chai and Causeway Bay, within Victoria City, Hong Kong
- WestConnex – project of similar scope and scale in Sydney, New South Wales, Australia
- Dublin Port Tunnel – similar project on a smaller scale in Dublin, Ireland
- Autopista de Circunvalación M-30, Túneles de la M-30 and Parque Madrid Río – similar project along the banks of Manzanares River, Madrid, Spain
- Blanka tunnel complex – similar project in Prague, Czech Republic and the longest city tunnel in Europe (6.4 km / 4.0 mi)
- Yamate Tunnel – similar project on a larger scale in Tokyo, Japan
