= Modern Continental =

Building contractor

- Company type: Private
- Industry: Construction
- Founded: 1967
- Founder: Les Marino, Kenneth Anderson
- Defunct: June 23, 2008
- Fate: Chapter 11 Bankruptcy
- Successor: LM Heavy Civil Construction LLC (2005–2021), Manafort Transit
- Headquarters: Cambridge, Massachusetts, United States
- Key people: John Pastore (President) Les Marino (President 1967 - 2004) Charlie Madden (Vice President)
- Services: Construction, Land Development
- Number of employees: 4,200 (2001)
- Subsidiaries: Modern Continental Enterprises (MCE), Modern Continental Pacific, Spearin Preston & Burrows Inc (SPB)

Modern Continental was a construction company based in Cambridge, Massachusetts, which was involved in the "Big Dig" Central Artery/Tunnel Project. On June 23, 2008, the company filed for Chapter 11 bankruptcy in federal court in Boston.

== History ==
Modern Continental Construction was a heavy-construction company and the original business in the Modern Continental group. It was founded in 1967 by Kenneth Anderson and Italian immigrant Les Marino. Beginning with a single sidewalk contract in Peabody, Massachusetts, the company grew into a regional heavy construction giant.

Marine construction firm Spearin, Preston & Burrows of Staten Island was acquired by Modern Continental.

Modern Continental specialized in:

- Airports
- Heavy Civil
- Design/Build
- Power & Industrial
- Mass Transit & Rail
- Highway & Bridges
- Buildings & Foundations
- Tunneling & Micro tunneling
- Treatment Facilities & Utilities

=== Diversification ===
Modern Continental Enterprises was a division of the company involved in various ventures. It built housing developments and managed office buildings. The division also operated marinas, charter and tendered bus services through Paul Revere Transportation, and ferry services through Boston Harbor Cruises. Additionally, it owned and operated an organic produce farm in Natick, Massachusetts, and ran an Italian restaurant, Ristorante Marino, in Cambridge, Massachusetts. Boston Harbor Cruises and Paul Revere Transportation were originally joint ventures established to transport workers to and from Deer Island during the construction of the Wastewater Treatment Plant.

==== List of Businesses ====
- Boston Harbor Cruises
- Paul Revere Transportation
- Boston Yacht Haven
- The Marina at James Landing
- Marino Center for Progressive Health
- Modern Health Store
- Marino Lookout Farm
- Ristorante Marino

== Criticism ==
Throughout 2004, Modern Continental Construction endured mounting criticism for its failure to complete multiple projects on schedule and its financial stability was questioned. These included the Route 3 North highway-widening project in northeastern Massachusetts and a major drinking-water pipeline in the San Francisco Bay Area. MCC was to finish the widening of Route 3 in 42 months by early 2005, but incurred delays of an additional 8 months. The State of Massachusetts fined Modern $10,000 for each day the project was unfinished.

The East Bay Municipal Utility District terminated a $24.5 million contract with Modern in early 2004 due to Modern's failure to meet construction schedules, insufficient staffing and oversight, and numerous pipe defects that Modern was unable to correct. (Note: While Modern was responsible for determining the location of utilities at the project site, Modern blamed project delays on inaccurate information regarding the location of gasoline pipelines received from Kinder Morgan, an energy infrastructure corporation. These inaccuracies later resulted in an explosion which killed 5 workers from the firm which replaced Modern.) East Bay Municipal Utility District reversed the termination for cause to a termination for convenience.

Modern was also briefly dropped from Massachusetts' list of highway contractors qualified to bid on state-funded projects. Later that year, questions were raised about the workmanship on a Central Artery contract, for which Modern was the lead contractor, after a large leak was found in the Interstate 93 tunnel beneath downtown Boston which led to the disclosure and discovery of "thousands of leaks."

On September 23, 2004, Marino announced plans to merge Modern Continental Construction with a subdivision of Jay Cashman, Inc., following recommendations from the insurance firms that bonded Modern's projects. Under the arrangement, Cashman would assume control of the company and oversee the completion of its remaining projects.

== Ceiling collapse ==
On July 10, 2006, approximately 26 short tons (52,000 lb; 23,500 kg) of concrete and framing materials fell from the ceiling of a tunnel on Interstate 90 in South Boston, Massachusetts. The collapse struck a car driven by Boston resident Angel Del Valle, severely injuring him and killing his wife, Milena. Investigations attributed the failure to bolts anchored with an epoxy adhesive that were used to secure the ceiling panels. This section of the highway was constructed by Modern Continental in 1999.

=== Investigation ===
During the period after the ceiling panel collapse, a memo allegedly written in 1999 by John J. Keaveney, a former Modern Continental employee, to his Project Manager warning of the potential for failure of the hanger system was sent to the Boston Globe. Keaveney said that he sent it to the Globe with a current Modern Continental employee's name and office address on the envelope because he feared the consequences if it were known that he provided the newspaper with the memo. "I was worried about the repercussions and that it might affect my family and my livelihood," stated Keaveney.

== Bankruptcy ==
On June 23, 2008, Modern Continental filed for Chapter 11 bankruptcy in federal court in Boston.

== LM Holdings LLC and LM Heavy Civil Construction, LLC ==
Following the bankruptcy of Modern Continental, a series of companies were formed by key executive personnel. LM Holdings LLC of Westford, Massachusetts was established by Massimo (Max) Marino in 2005. In 2010, the company was renamed LMH (LM Heavy Civil Construction, LLC) as part of an emphasis on establishing itself in the industry void once filled by Modern Continental.

=== Growth and Major Projects ===
LMH was fully acquired by Italy based C.M.C. di Ravenna (Cooperativa Muratori Cementisti) in 2011 and was held by its subsidiary CMC Holding Overseas S.p.a. LMH performed both site development/earthmoving for private clients and heavy construction for public agencies such as the MBTA and MassDOT. LMH continually won a slew of MBTA contracts as the apparent low bidder and quickly became a major player in trackwork.

The MBTA awarded the Wollaston Station Improvements and Quincy Center Garage Demolition contract, valued at $67,867,000, to a Joint Venture of LM Heavy and CMC in June 2016.

In 2017 LMH was shortlisted for the MBTA Green Line Extension (GLX) as part of the design-build consortium "Green Line Partners". This group was made up of The Lane Construction Corporation, Salini Impregilo, Judlau Contracting, and LMH-C.M.C. di Ravenna Joint Venture. Ultimately, the group failed to secure the project.

A $214-million project to renovate the MBTA Red Line Cabot Yard was awarded to LMH Lane, a Joint Venture of LM Heavy Civil and Cheshire CT based Lane Construction Co. Work proceeded in July 2018.

=== Demise ===
On December 7, 2018, CMC issued a press release stating that it had begun the process of insolvency according to Italian Law. Following the insolvency of CMC, LMH faced financial challenges that threatened its ability to complete its contracts with clients namely the MBTA. LMH had stated it had "essentially no money and as a result is unable to continue daily operations." During 2019, CMC and CMC Holding Overseas sought to find solutions to the "serious crisis situation of LMH" by negotiating with the creditors Zurich NA, Unicredit NY, and McCourt Legal Advisor. Projects such as the Wollaston Station Improvements were taken over by bond holders Zurich American Insurance Co. and its subsidiary, Fidelity and Deposit Co. of Maryland.
