= Christine Poon =

American business executive

- Born: 1952 (age 72–73); Brentwood, Missouri, U.S.
- Education: Northwestern University (BS); Saint Louis University (MA); Boston University (MBA)
- Spouse: Michael Tweedle

Christine Ann Poon (born c. 1952 in Brentwood, Missouri) is an American business executive. She is the former vice chairman of the Johnson & Johnson Board of Directors and worldwide chairman of J&J's Pharmaceuticals Group.

== Early life ==
Poon was raised as one of seven children; her mother was a nurse, and her father a physician. In a 2013 Distinguished Lecture at West Virginia University, she related how early experiences being Chinese in a predominantly white Ohio suburb shaped her character and desire to "...not be the stereotype you saw, but be who I wanted to be." Poon credits her brother for encouraging her to pursue a career at the interface of science and business, which led to her enrollment for an MBA (1982) and eventual employment at BMS in the Strategic Planning function.

== Career ==
Poon worked at Bristol Myers Squibb from 1985 to 2000, advancing to the position of President of the international medicines division. She credited an early role transition from a "line" to a "staff" function - Global Marketing - which exposed her to a more international vision of the pharmaceutical world and prepared her for leadership. She then joined Johnson & Johnson for 8 years, from 2000 to 2008. Major projects during her time included drugs to treat pain, schizophrenia, and HIV.

After her stint with J&J, Poon served as dean of Ohio State University's Fisher College of Business from April 2009 to November 2014. She is also member of the board of directors of Prudential Financial, Regeneron Pharmaceuticals, and Sherwin-Williams, and member of the supervisory board of Royal Philips Electronics.

== Awards ==
- 2009 - John W. Berry, Sr. Chair in Business, Ohio State University
- 2008 - Forbes "100 Most Powerful Women"
- 2005 - "Business Leader of the Future" from The Wall Street Journal / CNBC
- 2004 - Healthcare Businesswomen's Association "Woman of the Year"
