= John Cogliano =

Former Massachusetts Secretary of Transportation

Chairman of the Massachusetts Turnpike Authority
- In office August 16, 2006 – July 1, 2007
- Preceded by: Matthew J. Amorello
- Succeeded by: Bernard Cohen

Massachusetts Secretary of Transportation
- In office 2005–2007
- Preceded by: Daniel Grabauskas
- Succeeded by: Bernard Cohen

Personal details
- Party: Republican

John Cogliano is a former Massachusetts Secretary of Transportation and Chairman of the Massachusetts Turnpike Authority. He was appointed to the position by Governor Mitt Romney in May 2005. In 2007 Governor Deval Patrick replaced Cogliano with Bernard Cohen.

== Early life and education ==
Cogliano grew up in Canton, Massachusetts, where his family ran a Plant nursery.

He graduated from Boston College with a degree in political science and economics and later studied Administration and Management at Harvard University.

Cogliano worked at his family's nursery until 1991 when his father and uncle decided to sell the business.

== Early government career ==
In 1991 Cogliano was hired as a project manager for the Massachusetts Division of Capital Planning and Operations. In 1997 he moved to the Massachusetts Highway Department. He was appointed the department's Commissioner in 2002.

== Commissioner of the Massachusetts Highway Department ==
John Cogliano served as Commissioner of the Massachusetts Highway Department from 2002 to 2005. As Commissioner, he managed more than 1,800 employees and a budget of $700 million. During his tenure, Cogliano advanced a number of the Romney Administration's key initiatives, such as implementing the Fix it First and Communities First policies, streamlining operations and reducing bureaucratic inefficiencies and Red Tape at the Highway Department, implementing the use of GPS technology to bring accountability to MassHighway's snow and ice operations, accelerating spending on road and bridge projects to a minimum of $450 million a year, and breaking ground on the project to eliminate the Sagamore Rotary. He also helped develop the Romney Administration's Long-Range Transportation Plan, which calls for $31 billion in transportation improvements over the next 20 years and will serve as a blueprint for carrying out projects and policies under his Secretariat.

== Massachusetts Secretary of Transportation ==
As Secretary of Transportation, Cogliano instituted a hiring freeze, attempted to streamline operations by putting more than 250 additional employees under his control, and initiated the relocation of the Registry of Motor Vehicles from expensive Copley Square offices to a less expensive downtown location.

=== Big Dig ceiling collapse ===
Cogliano was Transportation Secretary on July 10, 2006, when a concrete ceiling panel weighing 3 tons (2722 kg) and measuring 20 by 40 ft (6.1 by 12.2 m) fell in on a car traveling Boston's Fort Point Channel Tunnel, killing a passenger and injuring the driver.

After the collapse, Cogliano chose to hire Bechtel/Parsons Brinckerhoff, the company that was responsible for overseeing the original construction of the tunnel, to inspect the repairs. The hiring of Bechtel/Parsons Brinckerhoff resulted in an inquiry from the Office of Inspector General for the Department of Transportation. Cogliano admitted that he regretted reusing the firm and the state promised not to hire any Bechtel/Parsons Brinckerhoff employees to work on repairs in the I-90 tunnel.

As a result of the collapse, Massachusetts Turnpike Authority Chairman Matthew J. Amorello was forced to resign and Cogliano succeeded him while retaining his job as Transportation Secretary. Cogliano remained Turnpike Chairman until July 1, 2007, when he was succeeded by State Transportation Secretary Bernard Cohen.
