= Jim Brett =

American executive

- Education: Boston University
- Occupations: CEO, J.Crew

James Brett is an American business executive in retail merchandising. He was CEO of J.Crew from July 2017 to November 2018. He previously held positions at West Elm, J. C. Penney, May Company, Anthropologie, and Urban Outfitters.

== Career ==
Brett began his merchandising career at J. C. Penney and May Company.

He was merchandise manager of the Anthropologie Home brand from 2003–2007. Danielle Sacks of Fast Company credited him with doubling sales by introducting a variety of international artisanal items. Following Anthropologie, Brett became the chief merchandising officer for Urban Outfitters.

Brett became president of West Elm in 2010. At the time, the brand was unprofitable and closing stores. He shifted West Elm's focus from machine-made goods to handmade textiles and merchandise often produced by local craftspeople worldwide. Up to January 31, 2016, uring his tenure as president, West Elm reported double-digit revenue growth in 24 consecutive quarters.

In 2012, Brett launched West Elm Market, a kitchen and home-goods store with a coffee shop serving La Colombe coffee, where at least 75% of the products are American made.

Brett began the West Elm Local program in 2013, designed to give stores distinct regional identities by sourcing goods from local artisans. He also committed West Elm through the Clinton Global Initiative to pay $35 million through 2015 to artisans in 15 countries. Brett entered into an agreement with Fair Trade USA for third-party validation that its goods were being produced responsibly.

In 2015, Brett expanded West Elm into contract furniture for offices through a new line of office furnishings called West Elm Workspace with a "residential aesthetic".

Brett said in 2015 that by 2017, 20% of West Elm's goods would have a Fair Trade USA certification, increasing to 40% by 2019.

In 2016, Brett said that West Elm was entering into the boutique hotel business, with locations in Detroit and Savannah, Georgia. opening in late 2018, followed by locations in Indianapolis, Minneapolis, and Charlotte, North Carolina. Brett, who is a gay-rights advocate, said he had "misgivings" about opening a hotel in North Carolina after the state passed its Public Facilities Privacy & Security Act, which eliminates anti-discrimination protections for lesbian, gay, bisexual, transgender, and genderqueer (LGBTQ) people in public accommodations and mandates that persons in government buildings are only allowed to use restrooms and changing facilities that correspond to the sex identified on their birth certificate. However, he said he ultimately decided that "the best way to effect change is to be there and be part of that change".

Brett was named to the board of directors at Cole Haan LLC in January 2016.

== Non-profit activities ==
Brett is on the advisory board of Nest, an organization that promotes business development for artisans and home workers operating in the informal economy outside of factory environments. He is also involved in the Human Rights Campaign, an advocacy group promoting civil rights for LGBTQ persons. Brett was the largest individual fund raiser for the 2015 AIDS Walk New York.

== Personal life ==
Brett is married to Ed Gray (who formerly operated a home furnishing store in Philadelphia) and lives in Brooklyn, New York City. In 2013, The New York Times published a photo essay tour of Brett and Gray's loft in a converted industrial building in Dumbo, Brooklyn.

== Honors ==
He received Interior Design Magazine's "Greater Good" award in 2016, in recognition of his efforts to support small-scale artisanal craft production, financial and literacy education, "fair trade" practices, and sustainable business development.
