= Central Artery =

Highway in Boston, Massachusetts

Central Artery
- John F. Fitzgerald Expressway
- Central Artery highlighted in red

Route information
- Maintained by MassDOT
- Length: 3.1819 mi (5.1208 km)
- Existed: 1959–present
- Component highways: I-93 (entire length); US 1 (entire length); Route 3 from South End to Charlestown

Major junctions
- South end: I-93 / US 1 / Route 3 in Boston
- I-90 (Mass Pike) in Boston; Route 3 / Route 28 in Boston
- North end: I-93 / US 1 at the Zakim Bridge in Charlestown

Location
- Country: United States
- State: Massachusetts
- County: Suffolk

Highway system
- Interstate Highway System; Main; Auxiliary; Suffixed; Business; Future; Massachusetts State Highway System; Interstate; US; State

The Central Artery (officially the John F. Fitzgerald Expressway) is the concurrent section of Interstate 93, US 1 and Route 3 through Downtown Boston, Massachusetts, United States. The modern-day Artery, built as part of the Big Dig from 1995 until 2003, begins at the Southeast Expressway in the South End. Traveling north, it has an interchange with the east–west Massachusetts Turnpike (I-90), and travels beneath the Financial District and Government Center through the O'Neill Tunnel. Route 3 exits onto the Leverett Connector within the tunnel in Charlestown; US 1 exits aboveground from the Zakim Bridge onto the Tobin Bridge, and I-93 continues on the Northern Expressway toward New Hampshire beyond the bridge.

The original Artery, constructed in the 1950s, was named after John F. Fitzgerald; it was partly elevated and partly tunneled. Its reputation for congestion inspired the local nicknames "The Distressway," "the largest parking lot in the world", and "the other Green Monster" (the paint of the highway girders was the same color as the left field wall at Fenway Park). The original Artery was demolished after the O'Neill Tunnel was completed, and was replaced with the Rose Fitzgerald Kennedy Greenway, named after the daughter of John F. Fitzgerald and the mother of John F. Kennedy.

== Description ==
=== Route designations ===
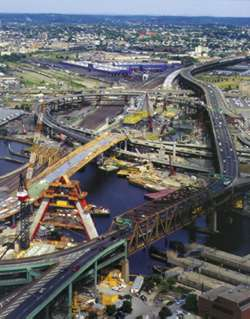
The elevated Central Artery around 1999, on the lower left

Currently, the Artery is numbered I-93 and US 1 on the whole route, and Route 3 on all but the northernmost section—it leaves at exit 18 (former exit 26).

The Artery has had many different route numbers through its history. When first built, the section between the Sumner Tunnel and Storrow Drive received the numbers C1 and C9 (city routes of US 1 and Route 9), which were rerouted off local streets. The rest of the highway was unnumbered, despite being closely paralleled by C37 south from the Sumner Tunnel.

By 1969, I-95 was assigned to the whole Artery as part of its never-built route through Boston. The "C-prefixed" routes were removed in 1971, with Route C1 becoming part of a realigned US 1, using the Artery between Storrow Drive and the Sumner Tunnel. Additionally in 1971, Route 3 was moved from a bypass around downtown to use the Artery south of Storrow Drive and the Southeast Expressway.

In 1974, I-95 was canceled through Boston (cancelling its approach from Providence, Rhode Island through the Southwest Corridor) and was instead rerouted around the city using part of Route 128. US 1 was realigned to use the Tobin Bridge and Northeast Expressway, which had been signed as part of I-95; thus US 1 used the Artery north of Storrow Drive. The former alignment of US 1 from Storrow Drive south along the Artery to the Sumner Tunnel became an extended 1A, and I-93 was extended south from Charlestown along the Artery, Southeast Expressway and Route 128 from Braintree to Canton. In 1989, US 1 was moved off the MDC Parkways onto its current alignment along the full Artery. Route 1A was then truncated to the Sumner Tunnel interchange.

Signs put up for the new underground Artery only mention I-93, since it is the best-known designation. Older signs may mention only I-93 and US 1 or I-93 and Route 3. A 2008/2009 project to update this signage helped to clear up this potentially confusing situation.

== History ==
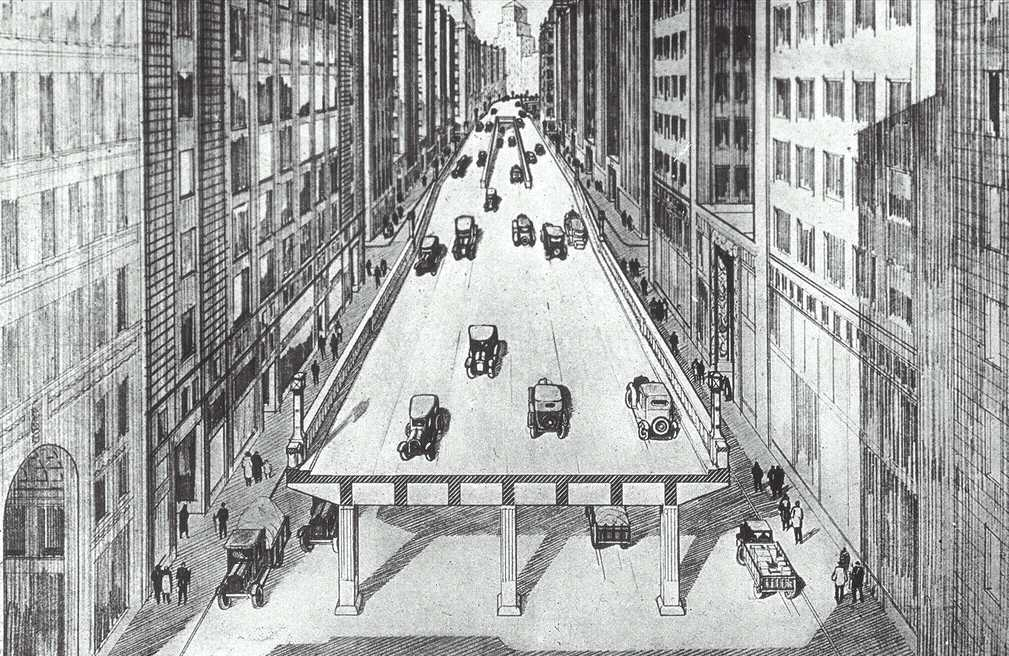
A 1920 plan for Boston's Central Artery, based on the West Side Elevated Highway

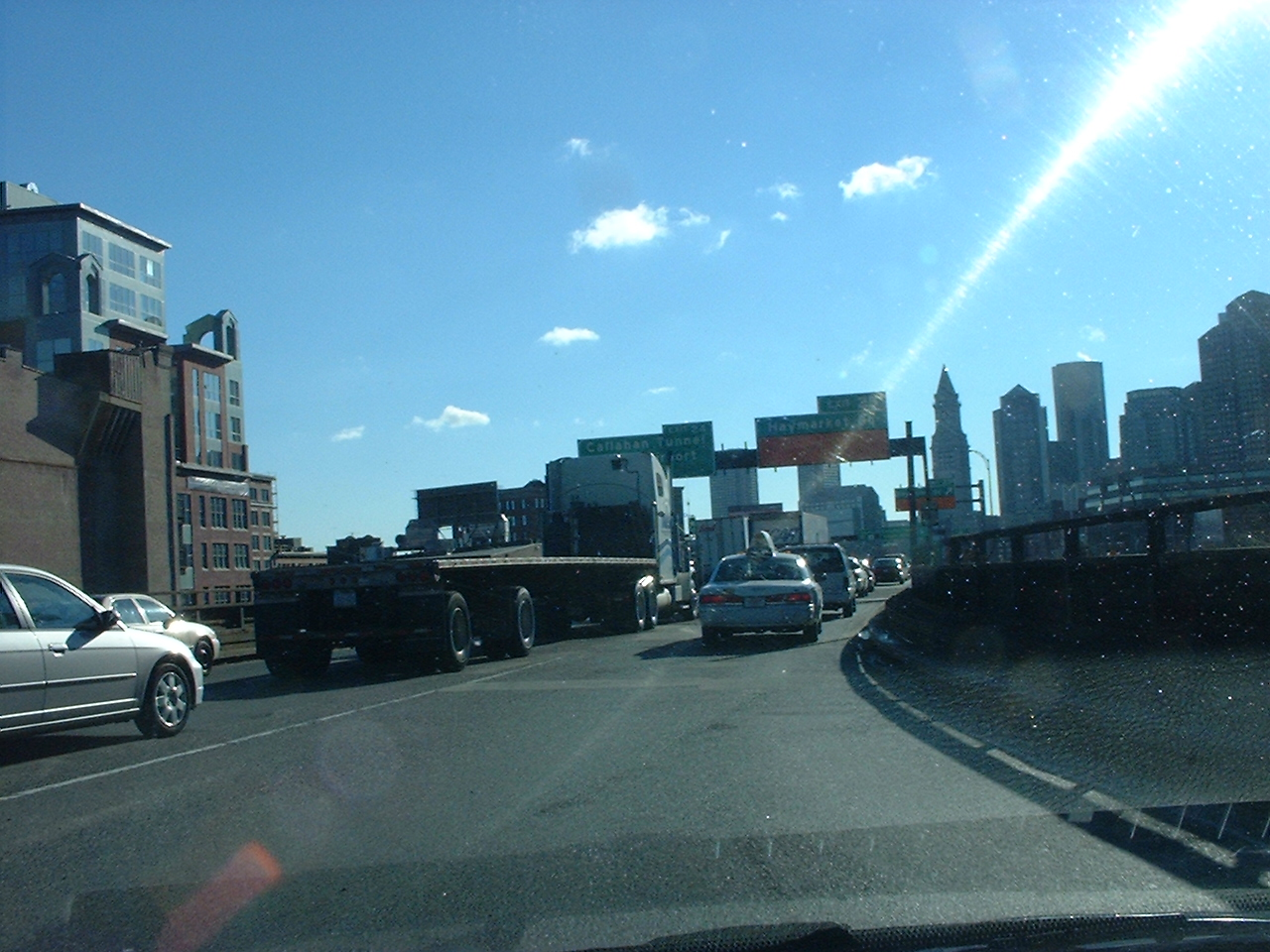
Traffic on the former Central Artery at mid-day in 2003

A 1926 state report on rapid transit expansion recommended the conversion of the Atlantic Avenue Elevated to an elevated highway; however, it closed in 1938 and was demolished in 1942. The above-ground Artery was built in two sections in the 1950s. First was the part north of High Street and Broad Street to the Tobin Bridge, built between 1951 and 1954. Immediately, residents began to hate the new highway and the way it towered over and separated neighborhoods. Due to this opposition, the southern end of the Central Artery through the South Station area was built underground, through what became known as the Dewey Square Tunnel. Eventually, the entire highway was moved underground as part of the Big Dig Project. The Dewey Square Tunnel was the one part of the original Artery not torn down; it now serves southbound traffic. The idea of building the entire Artery underground was first floated in the 1970s emanating from the central artery depression concept developed by the Boston Transportation Planning Review. The final section through the Dewey Square Tunnel and on to the Southeast Expressway at Massachusetts Avenue opened in 1959.

The highway gradually became more and more congested as other highway projects meant to complement the Artery were canceled. These included the Inner Belt project, which would have taken through traffic off the Artery and the Massachusetts Turnpike Extension coming in from the west. The Southwest Expressway would have been the route of Interstate 95 from Canton into Boston, and would have tied into the Inner Belt of I-695.

Modifications of the above-ground Artery, which was in service until its demolition in 2003 included an additional interchange for the Massachusetts Turnpike (Mass Pike) extension that was completed in 1965, the removal of several on and off-ramps and the reworking in the late 1980s of the Tobin Bridge interchange. The Central Artery North Area (CANA) project placed the above ground ramps from the Artery underground into the City Square Tunnel in Charlestown and resulted in a reworking of the interchange at the north end, placing the northbound offramp from the east side to the west side, and eliminating dangerous weaving across the lanes of the Charlestown High Bridge, which required traffic coming from Storrow Drive and wanting to go to Charlestown to cross three lanes of traffic in only a tenth of a mile.

In September 2017, a new park was opened beneath the Central Artery adjacent to the Ink Block section of Boston's South End. The $8.5 million park has a dog park, new lighting, boardwalks, murals, and 175 parking spaces. The artwork in the public space was created by street artists from around the United States.

== Exit lists ==
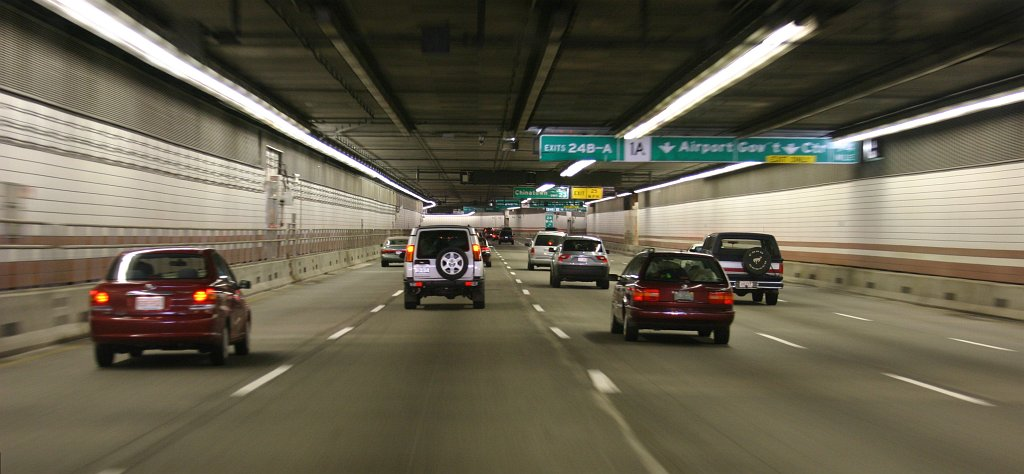
Southbound Interstate 93 beneath the streets of Boston

The original Central Artery did not have any exit numbers. These were added after the roadway was designated as I-93 in 1974. Many of these exits either do not exist or no longer resemble their original forms. Exits 19, 21, and 25 were completely eliminated. 16 and 18 (formerly exits 20 and 26) were separated northbound and southbound; 16 (former exit 20) northbound uses the old exit 19 location in South Bay, while southbound begins at the portal to the renovated Dewey Square Tunnel (now completely enclosed by Big Dig construction; 18 (former exit 26) northbound begins just shy of the tunnel exit onto the Zakim Bridge, while 18 (former exit 26) southbound is located in Charlestown's Sullivan Square near northbound exit 20 (formerly exit 28) at the portal to the double decked section of I-93 and feeds onto the Leverett Circle Connector bridge. Former exit 22 continued to exist as an offramp to Chinatown from the southbound (former northbound) Dewey Square tunnel until the ramp was closed off in 2004. 23 exists both northbound (now new exit 17) and southbound (now new exit 16B) and leads to the Scollay Square area. 17A-B southbound (formerly exit 24) now exits to Haymarket Square and MA-1A (the Callahan Tunnel). Much of the reconfiguration of on and offramps (particularly the wide separations of the ramps for exits 16 and 18) was done to move exiting traffic off the mainline of the road, reducing stress on the mainline.

=== Pre-Big Dig ===
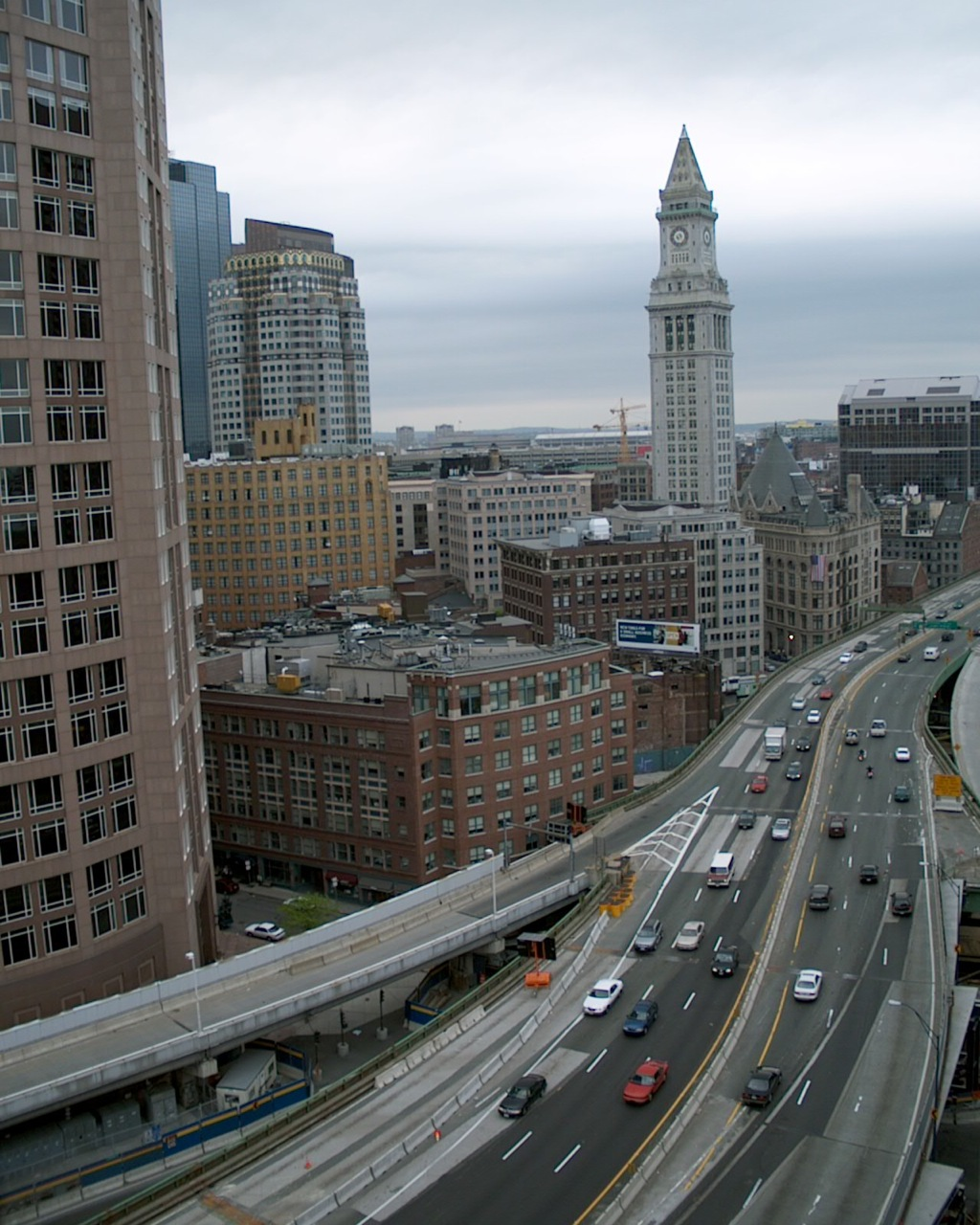
Central Artery exit towards Oliver Street, near Two International Place, overlooking Custom House Tower, 2002

The entire route was in Boston, Suffolk County.

Location	mi	km	Exit	Destinations	Notes
South End			–	I-93 south / US 1 south / Route 3 south	Continues south along Southeast Expressway
South End			18	Massachusetts Avenue – Roxbury / Andrew Square / South Bay Center	Southbound exit and northbound entrance
South End			19	East Berkeley Street / Broadway (northbound) / Albany Street (southbound)	Berkeley Street is former Dover Street
South End			20	I-90 west – Downtown Crossing, Worcester	Northbound and southbound entrance; former exit for Kneeland Street pre-I-90
Chinatown			21	Kneeland Street – Chinatown	Southbound exit and northbound entrance; former northbound exit for Lincoln Street
Financial District			22	South Station	No northbound exit
Financial District			23	Atlantic Avenue / Northern Avenue / High Street / State Street	Signed southbound for High Street only
Government Center			—	Dock Square / Clinton Street	Former southbound exit and northbound entrance; closed pre-Big Dig construction
Government Center			24	Callahan Tunnel (Route 1A north) – Logan Airport, Government Center	
North End			25	Causeway Street – Haymarket Square, North Station, Government Center	No northbound entrance; no southbound signage for Causeway Street
North End			26	Route 3 north (Storrow Drive) – Cambridge, North Station	Route 3 leaves Central Artery; signed southbound for Storrow Drive only
Charles River			Charlestown High Bridge		
Charlestown			27	US 1 north (Tobin Bridge) – Revere	US 1 leaves Central Artery
Charlestown			–	I-93 north	Continues north along Northern Expressway
1.000 mi = 1.609 km; 1.000 km = 0.621 mi: Closed/former; Incomplete access; Route transition

=== Post-Big Dig ===
The entire route is in Boston, Suffolk County. Exit numbers on I-93 will eventually change to a mileage-based exit numbering as part of Massachusetts Exit Renumbering Project.

Location	mi	km	Old exit	New exit	Destinations	Notes
South End	15.340	24.687		–	I-93 south / US 1 south / Route 3 south – Quincy	Continues south via Southeast Expressway
South End	15.340	24.687	20	16	I-90 / Mass Pike – Logan Airport, Worcester, South Station	Northbound exit and southbound entrance; exits 134A/C on I-90
South End				—	South Station / Airport	Northbound left exit and southbound left entrance. HOV restrictions from I-93 north were lifted by MassDOT.
South End			South end of the Thomas P. O'Neill Jr. Tunnel			
Financial District	17.253	27.766	20A	16A	South Station	Southbound exit and northbound entrance; exit 134A on I-90
Financial District	17.253	27.766	20B	16A	I-90 / Mass Pike west / Albany Street	Southbound exit and northbound entrance; exit 134B on I-90
Financial District	16.694	26.866	22	–	Surface Road – Chinatown	Southbound entrance only
Financial District	17.340	27.906	23	17	Government Center	Northbound exit and southbound entrance via North Street
Financial District	17.487	28.143	23	16B	Purchase Street	Southbound exit and entrance
Government Center	17.874	28.765	24A	17A	Government Center	Southbound exit only
Government Center	17.874	28.765	24B	17B	Route 1A north (Callahan Tunnel) – Airport	Southbound exit and northbound entrance
Government Center			North end of the Thomas P. O'Neill Jr. Tunnel			
Charles River			Leonard P. Zakim Bunker Hill Memorial Bridge			
Charlestown	17.892– 19.585	28.794– 31.519	26	18	Route 3 north / Route 28 (Storrow Drive) – Leverett Circle, Cambridge, North Station	Leverett Connector; signed as Storrow Drive northbound; Route 3 leaves Central Artery
Charlestown	18.603	29.939	27	19	US 1 north (Tobin Bridge) – Revere	Northbound exit and southbound entrance; US 1 leaves Central Artery
Charlestown	18.603	29.939		–	I-93 north – Concord, NH	Continues north via Northern Expressway
1.000 mi = 1.609 km; 1.000 km = 0.621 mi: Closed/former; HOV only; Incomplete access; Route transition
