= Charles River Dam =

Dam in Massachusetts, United States

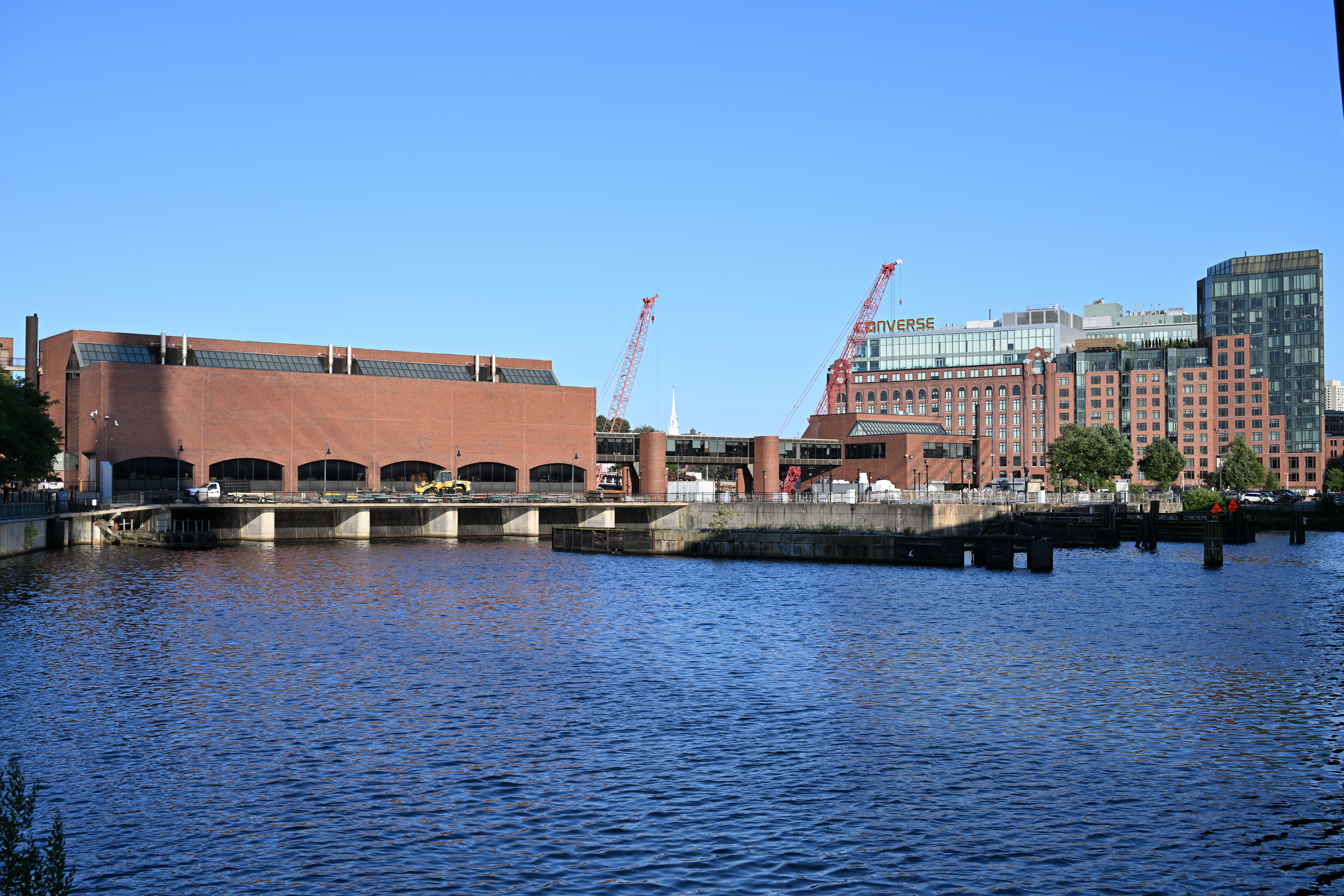
- Charles River Dam. Pump building is on the left, locks are towards the right.

- Location within Boston Location within Massachusetts
- Coordinates: 42.3685°N 71.061°W

The Charles River Dam is a flood control structure on the Charles River in Boston, Massachusetts, located just downstream of the Leonard P. Zakim Bunker Hill Memorial Bridge, near Lovejoy Wharf, on the former location of the Warren Bridge.

== History ==
The Charles River Dam was built by the U.S. Army Corps of Engineers. The structure also includes the "Colonel Richard Gridley Locks", named for General George Washington's first army engineer. Built and operational in 1978, the three locks feature a pedestrian crossing known as the Gridley Locks Footpath. This walkway allows pedestrians to cross the Charles River directly over the lock gates, connecting Paul Revere Park in Charlestown to Lovejoy Wharf and the North Station area. The footpath is part of the popular Boston Harborwalk and functions as a segment of the Mass Central Rail Trail. The dam contains three individual locks, with one wider than the other two to accommodate the occasional passing of a larger vessel. The structure also includes a fish passage. Six diesel-powered, 2700 horsepower turbo-charged engines drive six pumps with a combined capacity of about 3.7 million US gallons (14,000 m^{3}) per minute or 8140 cubic feet per second (CFS).

The dam controls the surface level of the river basin as well its tributaries upstream, including the Back Bay Fens and Muddy River and to prevent sea water from entering the Charles River freshwater basin during high tides. It replaced the 1910 Charles River Dam upstream, now the site of the Boston Museum of Science . The 1910 dam includes two locks (one under the Science Museum parking garage). Both locks are now kept open for navigation. The older dam could not keep sea water out and a layer of salt water accumulated at the bottom of the fresh water basin, contributing to pollution and fish migration problems.

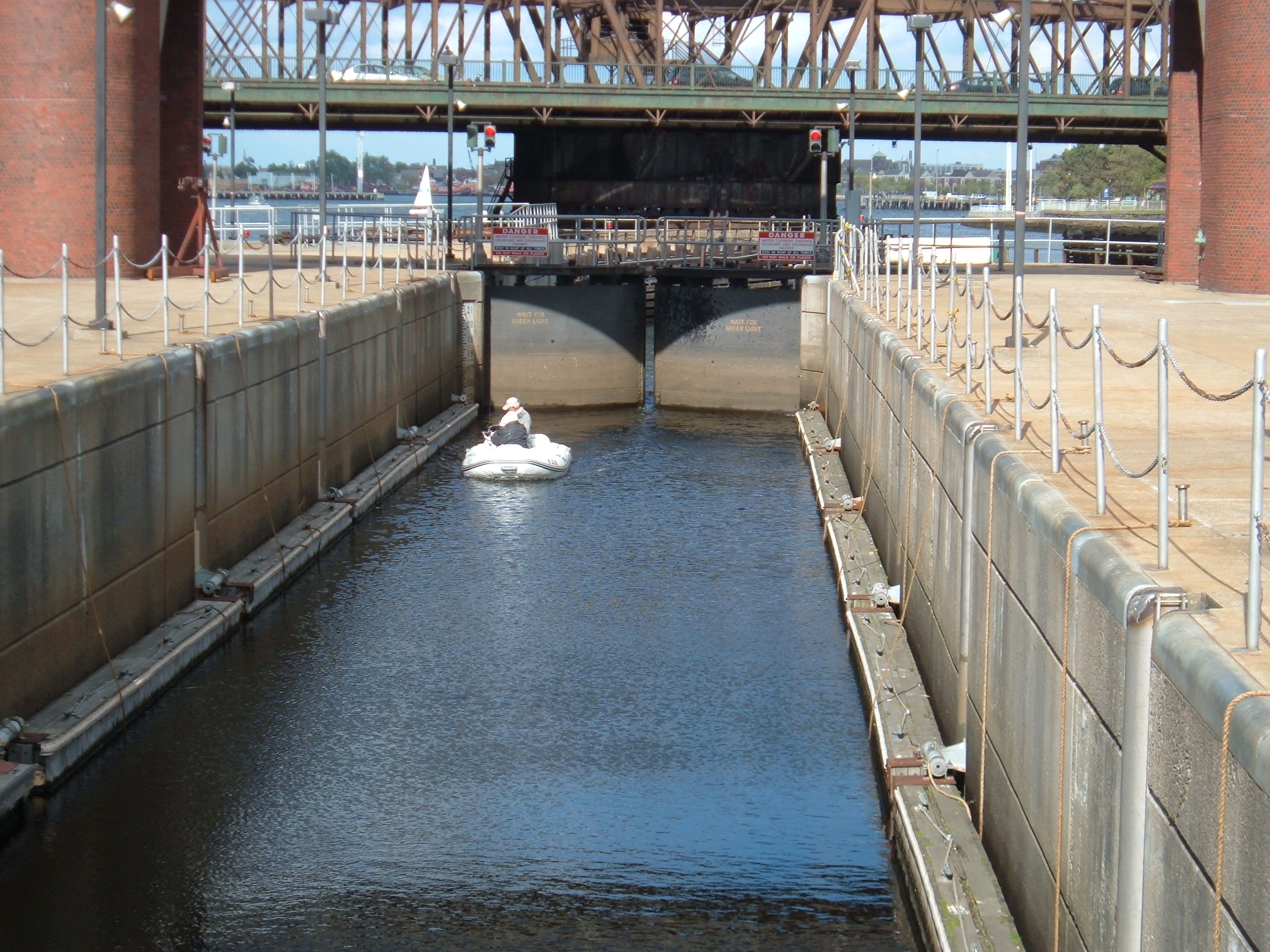
A lock on the Charles River Dam.

The dam's walkway is the site of the "Charlestown Bells", an interactive art installation by Paul Matisse, consisting of a set of chimes mounted on the railing that passers-by can strike. The work was refurbished in 2013 after it had fallen into disrepair.

The Charles River Dam was once in the shadow of the former Charlestown High Bridge located upstream. It was replaced by the Leonard P. Zakim Bunker Hill Bridge just upstream.
