= O'Neill Tunnel =

Highway tunnel in Boston, Massachusetts

Coordinates: 42°21′28″N 71°3′06″W

Thomas P. O'Neill Jr. Tunnel
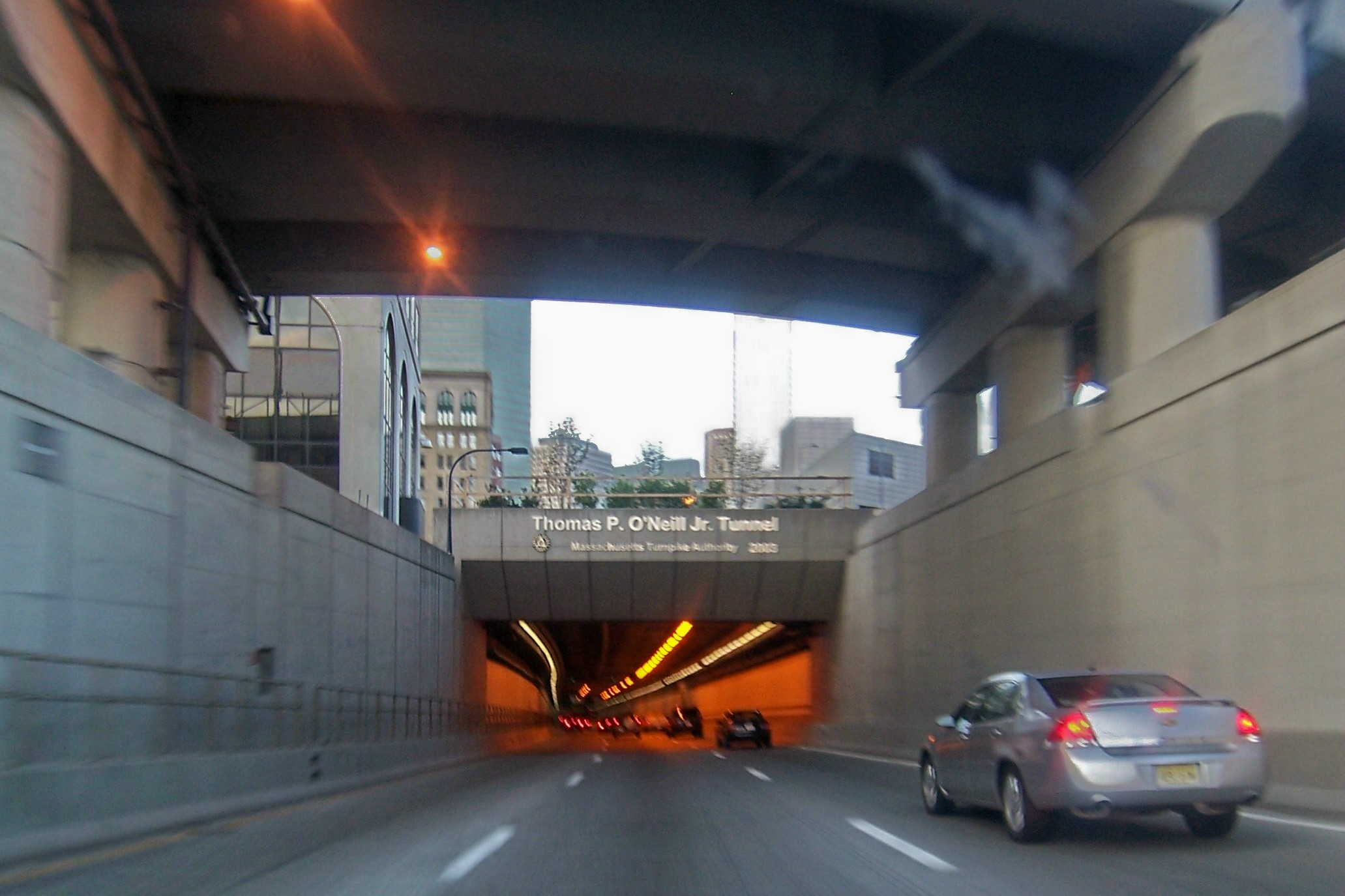
- The northbound entrance to the tunnel from I-93
- Interactive map of Thomas P. O'Neill Jr. Tunnel

Overview
- Location: Boston, Massachusetts
- Status: Open
- Route: I-93 / US 1 / Route 3
- Start: South Boston
- End: Zakim Bunker Hill Bridge

Operation
- Constructed: 1995–2004
- Opened: March 29, 2003 (northbound), December 20, 2003 (southbound)
- Owner: Commonwealth of Massachusetts
- Operator: Massachusetts Department of Transportation

Technical
- Length: 1.5 mi (2.4 km)
- No. of lanes: 6 - 10
- Operating speed: 45 mph (72 km/h)

The Thomas P. "Tip" O'Neill Jr. Tunnel (colloquially O'Neill Tunnel) is a highway tunnel built as part of the Big Dig in Boston, Massachusetts. It carries the Central Artery underneath downtown Boston, and is numbered as Interstate 93 (I-93), U.S. Route 1 (US 1), and Route 3. It roughly follows the route of the old elevated Central Artery, though the northbound entrance, at the corner of Kneeland Street and Atlantic Avenue, is somewhat east of the southbound exit (at Kneeland and Albany streets) to allow for a reconfigured interchange with the Massachusetts Turnpike. It runs from the Zakim Bunker Hill Bridge at its north portal—barely 165 feet (50 m) east of the TD Garden sports facility's eastern corner—to Boston's Chinatown at its south portal. The tunnel is named for Tip O'Neill, former Speaker of the United States House of Representatives, whose constituency included several of the surrounding communities in Metro Boston.

== History ==
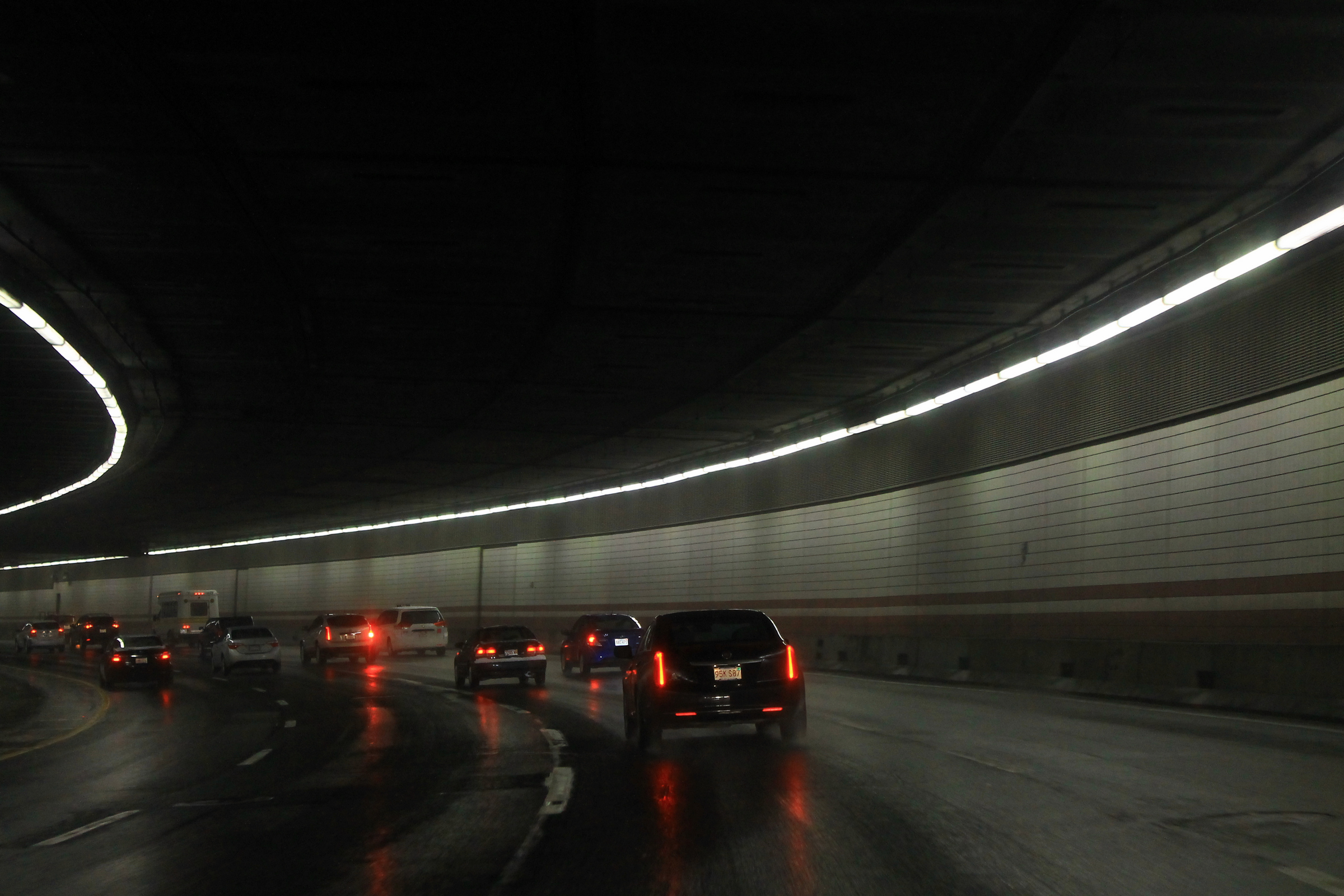
O'Neill Tunnel in 2016

Planning for the tunnel began in the mid-1980s, when it was determined that a replacement for the Central Artery was needed. Originally built for 75,000 vehicles a day, the expressway was carrying 200,000 vehicles a day by the early 1990s. It was even projected that, by 2010, there would be 16-hour daily traffic jams that would cost the local economy $500 million annually. Furthermore, the North End was cut off from the rest of the city, which hampered economic growth.

One challenge for building the tunnel was constructing the project underneath the existing expressway, as well as crippling the city due to the amount of construction involved. In 1992, construction began on the tunnel, with the relocation of utilities. This was followed in 1996 by the beginning of construction on the tunnels with the pouring of slurry to build walls, which was preceded by underpinning the expressway. The northbound portion of the tunnel was opened in March 2003, followed by the opening of the southbound section in December of the same year. The renovated Dewey Square Tunnel, which was eventually incorporated into the O'Neill Tunnel, was opened in 2005.

In March 2003, Massachusetts Governor Mitt Romney proposed to name the tunnel the "Liberty Tunnel". The state legislature and the Massachusetts delegation to Congress opposed the choice, and it was officially named after O'Neill (a longtime Speaker of the United States House of Representatives) by Section 1930 of the Safe, Accountable, Flexible, Efficient Transportation Equity Act: A Legacy for Users (SAFETEA-LU), which was passed by Congress and signed by then-President George W. Bush in 2005.

Within a year of opening, a large leak backed up traffic for miles, which led to more investigation into leaks that were occurring within the structure. Due to the location of the tunnel near the ocean, brackish water was able to seep into cracks within the concrete, which have had the potential to cause flooding. This was also due to the purposeful design of the concrete to withstand 50-degree temperature swings, instead of the actual 100-degree swings that are experienced in Boston. In 2007, there were 500 leaks that needed to be repaired. Corrosion of the tunnel light fixtures also became a problem as well, which was evidenced in 2011 when a light fixture fell onto the roadway. Between fixing the leaks and fixing corroded structures, a report in 2011 estimated that the costs could run a few hundred million dollars.

== See also ==
- Transportation in Boston
