= Dewey Square Tunnel =

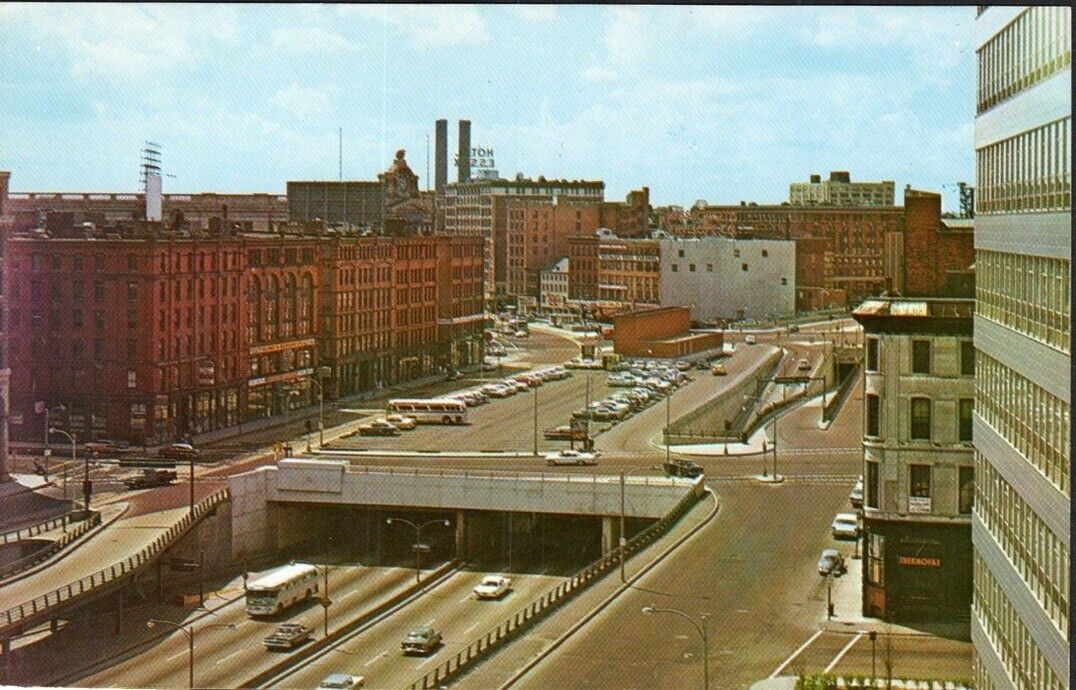
- 1960s postcard of the Dewey Square Tunnel
- Interactive map of Dewey Square Tunnel

Overview
- Official name: Thomas P. O'Neill Jr. Tunnel
- Other name: South Station Tunnel
- Location: Boston, Massachusetts
- Coordinates: 42°20′54″N 71°03′27″W
- Route: I-93 / US 1 / Route 3

Operation
- Work began: 1956
- Constructed: 1951-1959
- Opened: June 20, 1956
- Rebuilt: 1996
- Reopened: March 5, 2005
- Owner: Commonwealth of Massachusetts
- Operator: Massachusetts Department of Transportation
- Traffic: Automotive

Technical
- Length: 0.45 mi (0.72 km)
- No. of lanes: 6 (originally); 4 (current)
- Operating speed: 45 mph (72 km/h)

The Dewey Square Tunnel in Boston, Massachusetts, is part of Interstate 93 (concurrent with US 1 and Route 3), running under the heart of the city's financial district, including Dewey Square. Built in 1959, it was part of Boston's Central Artery freeway construction project of the 1950s. Known to locals as the South Station Tunnel (due to its proximity to South Station), the Dewey Square Tunnel is of cut-and-cover design, and originally was six lanes wide (three in each direction), with no breakdown lanes.

Because of public outcry during construction of The Central Artery, elevated for most of its length and reviled because it cut off views of and access to Boston's historic waterfront, it was decided during the Governorship of John A. Volpe that the final section of the artery was to be put underground from just south of Congress Street to Kneeland Street near Boston's Chinatown section. At the time of its construction, it was the widest vehicular tunnel in the world.

At one time, a bus terminal serving Peter Pan, Bonanza, and other regional bus lines sat atop the tunnel near its northern portal. The bus station has since been relocated to the major intermodal transportation hub at South Station.

The lack of breakdown lanes, the limited number of travel lanes, and the myriad access ramps to and from the Artery and the tunnel caused massive traffic jams and gridlock, forcing transportation officials to consider rebuilding the Artery and putting it totally underground. The Dewey Square Tunnel received new life as part of the massive Big Dig project of the late 1990s and early 2000s. The tunnel was rehabilitated and now serves as exclusive southbound lanes of Interstate 93 and their southern portal of the new Thomas P. O'Neill Jr. Tunnel, complete with a new ventilation system and gently banked corners consistent with appropriate superelevation. Its old northern portal at Congress Street was connected to the underground southbound lanes of the new artery in 2005.

A long-closed northbound off-ramp to Chinatown was rebuilt and reopened as a southbound on-ramp from Surface Road. The refurbished tunnel, with 6 lanes at its widest point, was fully opened on March 5, 2005. The Dewey Square Tunnel is the only remaining section of the original Central Artery still in use. Since the completion of the Big Dig project, the name "Dewey Square (South Station) Tunnel" has fallen into general disuse; instead, it is considered to be part of the Thomas P. O'Neill Jr. Tunnel, a name used for the entire length of the north–south tunnel system.
