= Charlestown High Bridge =

Bridge in Boston, Massachusetts (1954–2004)

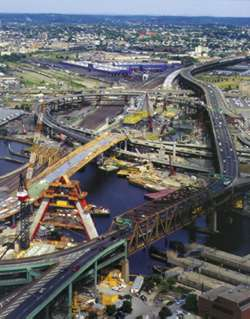
- The Charlestown High Bridge (lower right) has been replaced by the now-complete Zakim Bunker Hill Bridge (center)
- Coordinates: 42.369075°N 71.062472°W
- Carries: I-93 / US 1
- Crosses: Charles River
- Locale: Boston, Massachusetts (North End to Charlestown)

Characteristics
- Design: double-decker Warren truss bridge

History
- Opened: 1954
- Closed: 2004

Location
- Interactive map of Charlestown High Bridge

The Charlestown High Bridge (referred to as the John F. Fitzgerald Bridge on old AAA Tourbook maps) spanned the Charles River in Boston, Massachusetts, and was part of I-93/US 1 at the north end of the Central Artery.

This double-decked truss bridge, built in 1954, was to originally carry I-95 through Boston from southwest to northeast in tandem with the Tobin Bridge, built in 1950. The I-95 project and several other highway projects in and around Boston, including both the highly controversial Inner Belt (I-695) and the Southwest Corridor, completing the right-of-way intended to bring I-95 into Boston from Providence, Rhode Island, were cancelled due to heavy public opposition in the early 1970s. I-93 was allowed to be completed from the Yankee Division Highway (Route 128) to the foot of the Charlestown High Bridge in 1969, and the I-93 designation was extended onto the bridge and the Central Artery in the early 1970s.

Originally intended to carry 75,000 vehicles per day in the 1950s, the Charlestown High Bridge carried upwards of 200,000 vehicles per day in the 1990s. For years, the bridge was a major traffic bottleneck that affected southbound commuters from Boston's North Shore and southern New Hampshire for miles. Travelling northbound, due to a poorly planned lane drop to accommodate incoming vehicles from Storrow Drive, traffic backups leading to the High Bridge threatened to cause hours of daily gridlock in downtown Boston. These problems were addressed in the planning and construction of the $14.6 billion Big Dig project. The cable-stayed Zakim Bunker Hill Bridge, which opened fully to traffic in December 2003, replaced the Charlestown High Bridge, which was demolished in 2004.

== See also ==
- List of crossings of the Charles River
