= Interstate 695 (Massachusetts) =

Proposed highway in Massachusetts

Interstate 695
- Inner Belt
- Proposed I-695 corridor highlighted in red

Route information
- Auxiliary route of I-95
- Maintained by MassDOT
- Length: 7.3 mi (11.7 km)
- Existed: 1955–1971
- NHS: Entire route

Major junctions
- South end: I-93
- North end: I-95

Location
- Country: United States
- State: Massachusetts

Highway system
- Interstate Highway System; Main; Auxiliary; Suffixed; Business; Future; Massachusetts State Highway System; Interstate; US; State
← I-495	→ I-895

Interstate 695 (I-695; also called the Inner Belt) was a planned six-lane auxiliary Interstate Highway in Boston, Massachusetts, that would have run through parts of Boston, Brookline, Cambridge, and Somerville.

== Route description ==
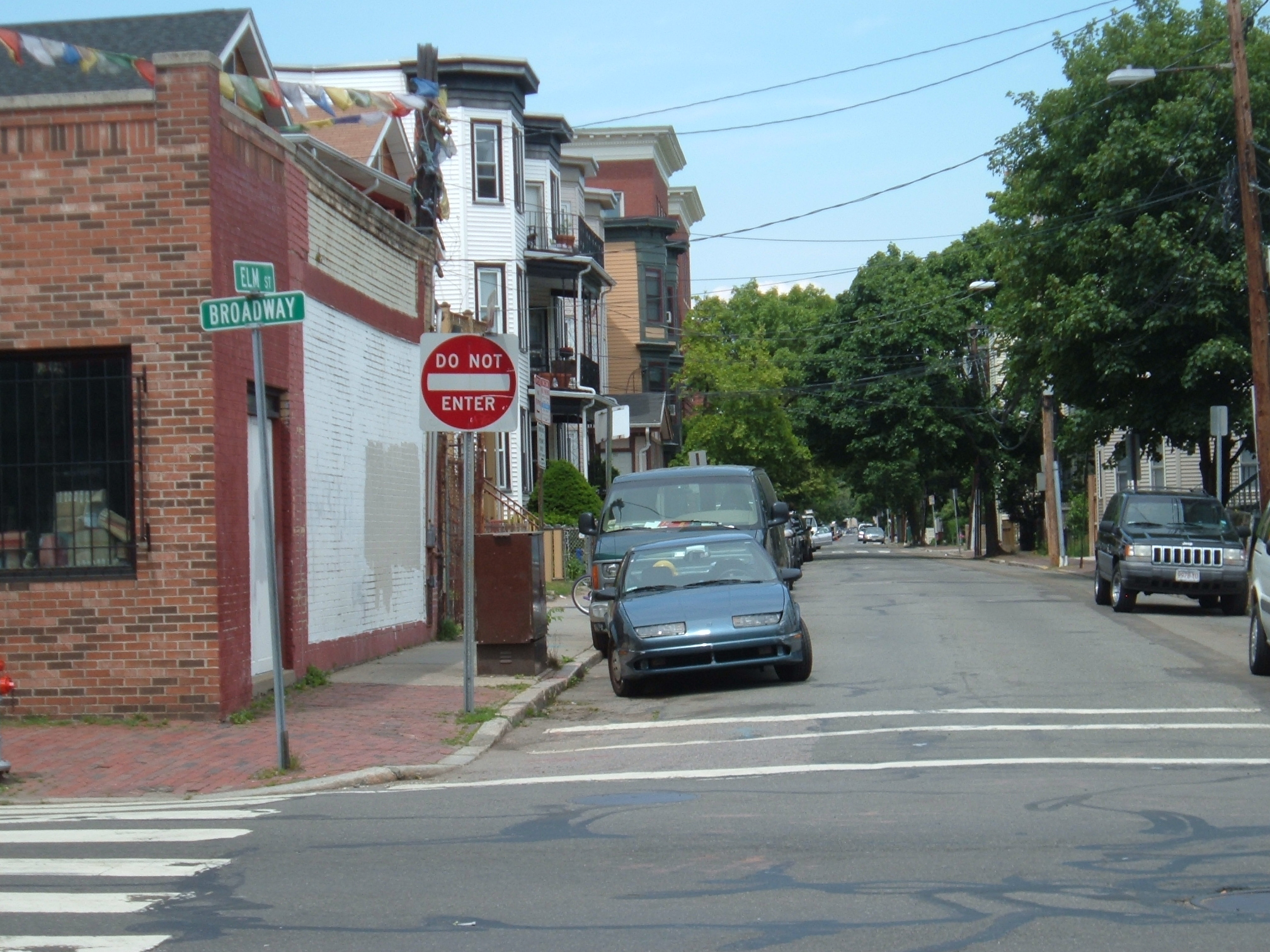
A block of Elm Street in Cambridge along the proposed route of the Inner Belt.

The highway would have been called I-695 and would have provided a circumferential route inside the Route 128 corridor. A 1955 plan suggested this routing:

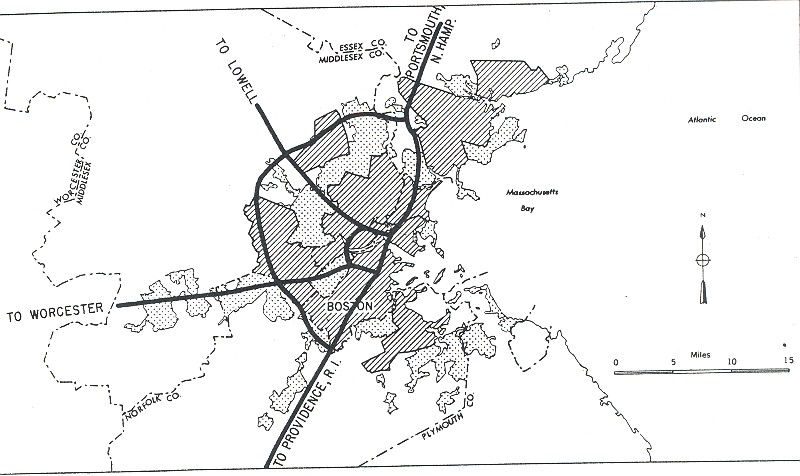
1955 Yellow Book plan for the Boston area showing the Inner Belt and related highways

- Connection with I-93 in Charlestown at Yard 8, what is now Inner Belt Road, Somerville
- Paralleling Washington Street, Somerville (right-of-way is now New Washington Street)
- Connection with Northwest Expressway/US Route 3 (US 3)/Route 2 (unbuilt) in Union Square, Somerville
- Along Elm Street past Inman Square
- Past Central Square, Cambridge, through Cambridgeport paralleling Brookline Street
- Crossing the Charles River at the Boston University Bridge, replacing the local street bridge with a two-level local and elevated highway bridge, or bypassing the bridge with a tunnel
- Connection with the Western Expressway (Massachusetts Turnpike) near the Charles River
- Running under the Back Bay Fens along the Fenway or Park Drive
- Connection with the Southwest Corridor (unbuilt)
- Running via what became Melnea Cass Boulevard
- Connection with the Southeast Expressway via what is now the Mass Avenue connector

(A 1948 plan called for the Southeast Expressway and Southwest Corridor to meet the Inner Belt at the same point.)

== History ==
=== Cancellation ===
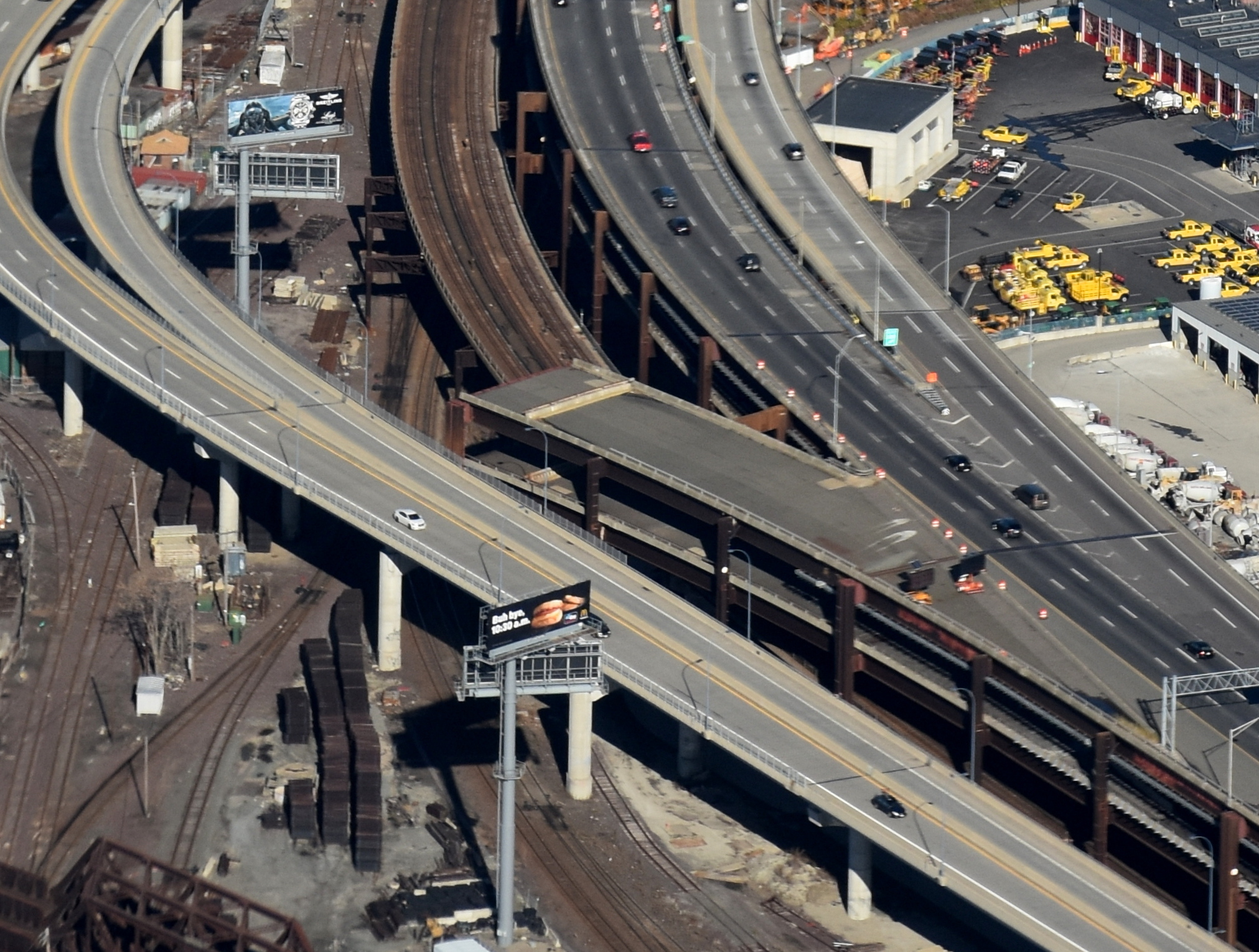
"Ghost ramp" off I-93 northbound in Somerville, which was built as a future connection to the Inner Belt and never used

Organized community opposition to the project began in 1965, when three city planners at the Boston Redevelopment Authority (now the Boston Planning & Development Agency)—Tunney Lee, Fred Salvucci, and Dennis Blackett—founded the Cambridge Committee on the Inner Belt. The group, which later became incorporated as the Urban Planning Aid (UPA), published articles in the Cambridge Chronicle criticizing the highway plan and disseminated maps of the route to residents, highlighting the Inner Belt's potentially disastrous effects on Cambridge's urban landscape. With the help of Father McManus, a local priest, the UPA mobilized Cambridge residents against the state's highway plan, and the anti-highway activists won over the Cambridge City Council, which became committed to stopping the project. The following year, in 1966, Cambridge residents protested the Inner Belt outside the Massachusetts State House, leading then-Governor John A. Volpe to order a restudy of the highway's route through Cambridge.

The Black United Front (established in 1968) also mobilized residents in Roxbury against the Inner Belt and broader racial justice issues, working with the UPA to mobilize residents across Greater Boston. A new group, the Greater Boston Committee (GBC) on the Transportation Crisis, was founded in 1968 to coordinate the anti-highway movement. The GBC's work culminated in the People Before Highways protest on January 25, 1969, when hundreds of residents flooded the Massachusetts State House, demanding that Governor Francis Sargent (who assumed office just three days prior when Volpe was confirmed as President Richard Nixon's secretary of transportation) cancel the Inner Belt and Southwest Corridor.

The project was canceled in 1971 after intense protests organized by community activists, and following Sargent's 1970 moratorium on highway construction inside Route 128. It would have displaced some 7,000 people from their homes, created what opponents at the time called a "Chinese wall" dividing long established neighborhoods, and gutted large parts of the city of Cambridge and the Boston neighborhood of Roxbury. There was also speculation that the construction of the Inner Belt would essentially bypass Downtown Boston completely, resulting in economic stagnation in a city that was already having considerable financial problems. Unresolved traffic problems resulting from the cancelation were among the factors eventually leading to Boston's Big Dig highway project, decades later.

The Northwest Expressway was to carry Route 2 and Route 3 along a four-lane highway from the northwest (the current outer intersection of US 3 and Route 128 in Burlington) via Cambridge to connect with the Inner Belt in Union Square, Somerville. Instead, the Route 2 highway was never rerouted to the Fitchburg Line right-of-way and alternately now terminates along the right-of-way of the old Cambridge and Concord Turnpike (Route 2). That intersection left the highway terminating at a traffic circle in northwest Cambridge, where it intersected Route 16. In the 1980s, the rotary was replaced by a traffic light and the highway was connected to the park-and-ride garage at Alewife station on the newly extended Red Line.

An outer belt, I-495, was completed by 1982 around Greater Boston.

=== Reuse of right-of-ways ===
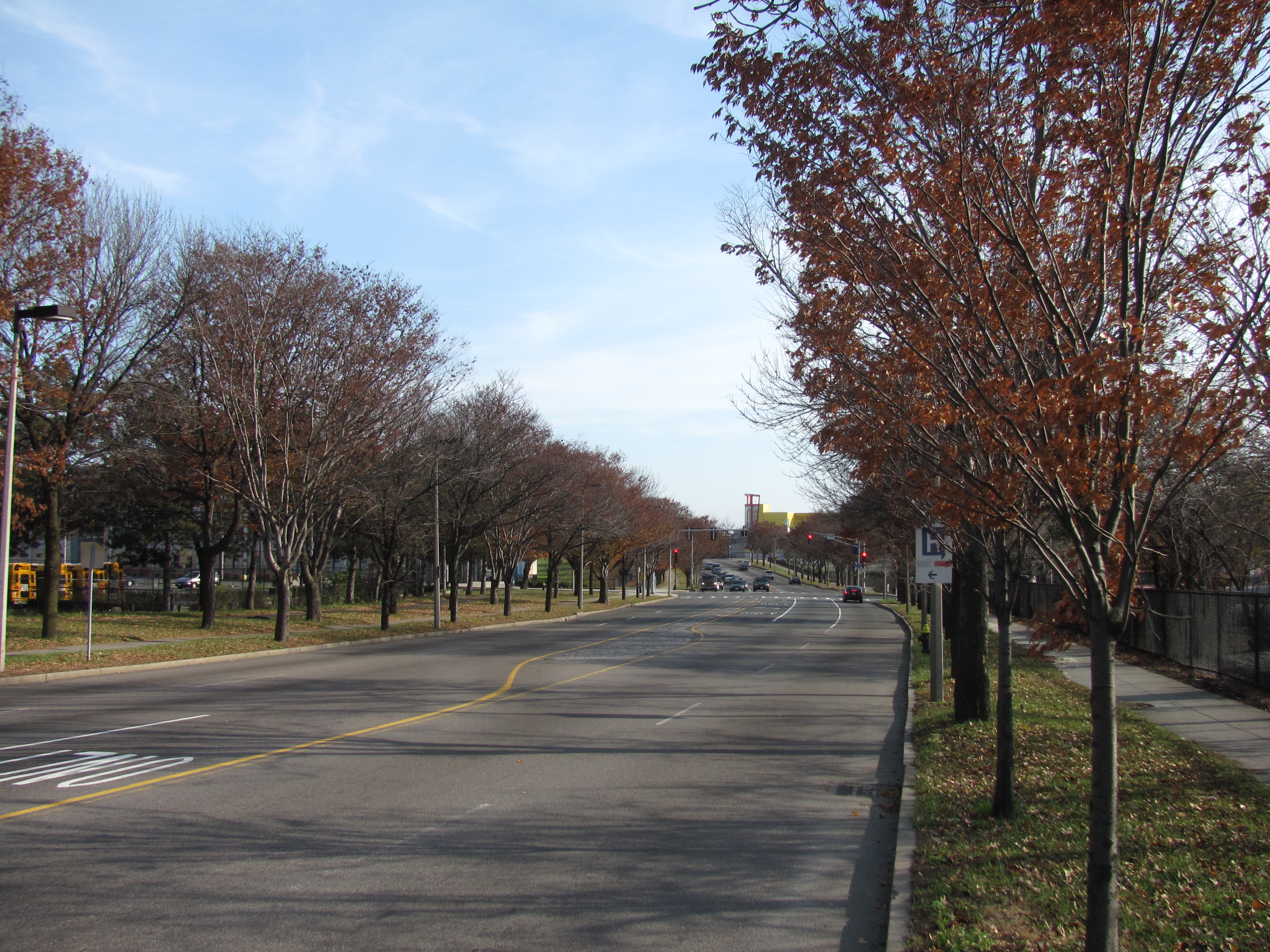
Melnea Cass Boulevard in Roxbury, built along the right-of-way cleared, but never used, for I-695

With the cancelation of the "Southwest Corridor" route for I-95, and the resultant alternate usage of much of that right-of-way for a significant length of the relocated southwest section of the Orange Line subway's above-ground run, Route 128 between I-95 south and I-95 north was made part of the Interstate System as I-95. The right-of-way for the I-695 portion of the beltway in Roxbury had already been cleared and now contains an arterial road, Melnea Cass Boulevard. The former Southwest Corridor portion of the right-of-way was converted into Southwest Corridor Park and the new route for the new depressed southern section of Boston's Orange Line subway, from Tufts Medical Center station southwestward. The older elevated Orange Line right-of-way along Washington Street was subsequently torn down by 1987 and eventually replaced by the Silver Line rapid bus service.

Remnants of the Inner Belt were visible for many years on I-93 at what is now the Storrow Drive Connector interchange (exit 18 [old exit 26] southbound) in Somerville (which would have been the northern terminus of I-695) and at the Massachusetts Avenue interchange in Boston (which would have been the Route 3/I-95 junction at the southern terminus of the beltway). Some, but not all, of these remnants have been demolished as part of the Big Dig; in particular, the Leverett Circle Connector Bridge uses the northern pair of ramps in Somerville and had to be built around the southern pair of ramps. A still-extant but barricaded spur just north of the new Leonard P. Zakim Bunker Hill Memorial Bridge on both levels of I-93 north was intended to connect to the Inner Belt.

An industrial park in Somerville, built on the remnants of the Boston and Maine Railroad's Yard 8, near the intended northern terminus of the highway is built around a street known as "Inner Belt Road".

== See also ==
- California State Route 480 — similar project in San Francisco, also cancelled
- Freeway and expressway revolts
- Inner Belt District
- NIMBY
- Urban Ring Project (MBTA) — proposed mass transit route along approximate Inner Belt path
- Category:Cancelled highway projects in the United States
