= Paul Revere Park =

Park in Charlestown, Massachusetts, United States

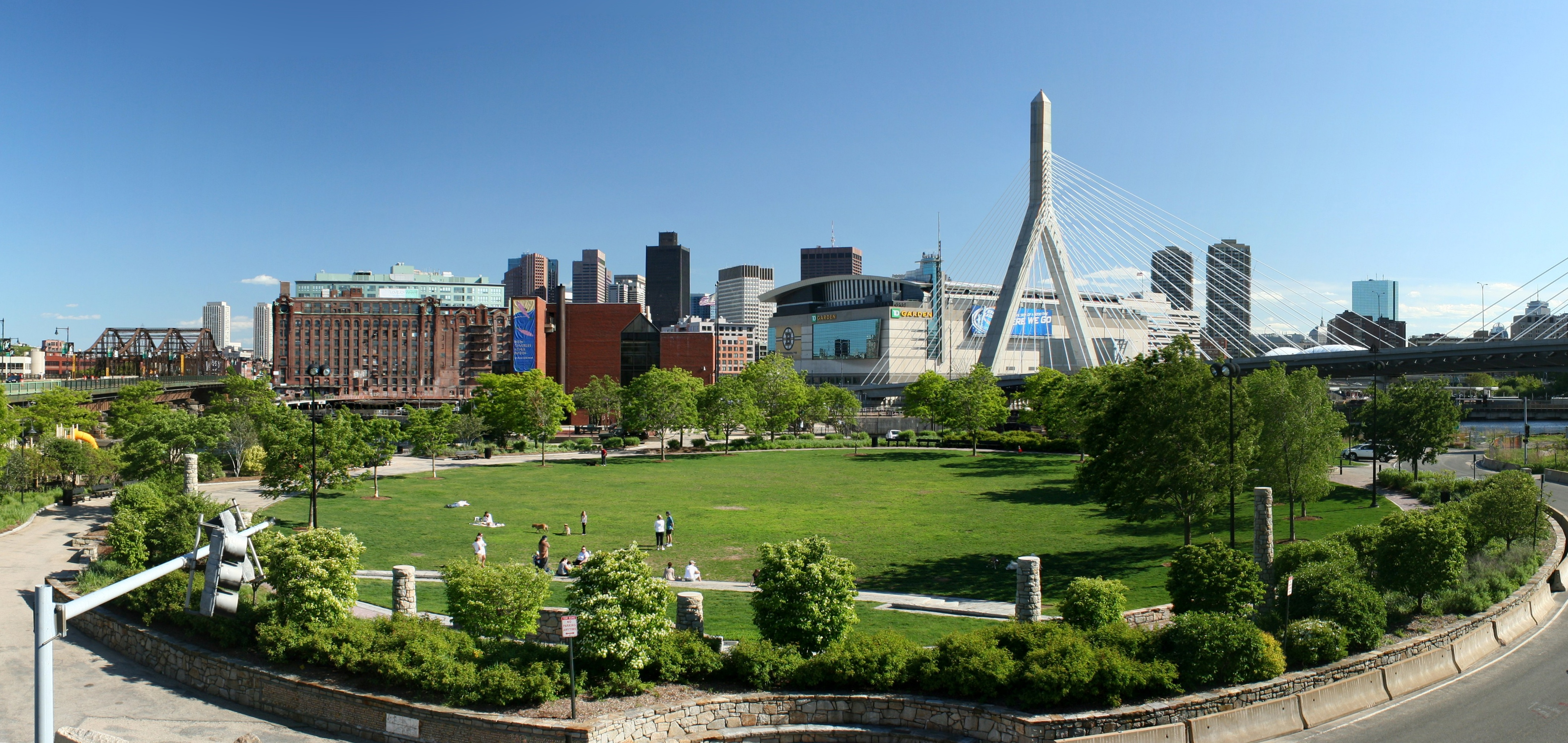
- The eastern (down-river) portion of Paul Revere Park, taken in 2010 before the western half was completed. The oval and amphitheater are in the foreground, and the playground is visible through the trees on the left of the image. The Leonard P. Zakim Bunker Hill Memorial Bridge and the TD Garden are in the background.
- Interactive map of Paul Revere Park
- Type: Park
- Location: Charles River
- Nearest city: Charlestown, Massachusetts
- Coordinates: 42°22′12″N 71°03′45″W
- Area: 5-acre (2.0 ha)
- Created: 1999

Paul Revere Park is a five-acre (2.0 ha) park located on the Charles River in Charlestown, Massachusetts. The park was the first park to open along the "Lost Half Mile" of the Charles River as mitigation for the taking of planned parkland for the construction of the Big Dig. The park runs along the Charles River between the Freedom Trail on North Washington Street and the Leonard P. Zakim Bunker Hill Memorial Bridge. The park features a large oval-shaped lawn, an informal performance area, and a playground.

The park first opened in 1999, although the upstream portions of the park were used as a staging area for the construction of the Zakim Bridge and did not open until 2007. The North Bank Bridge, a 690-foot pedestrian bridge under the Zakim Bridge and over the MBTA railroad tracks leading into North Station, opened in 2012, connecting the park to North Point Park in Cambridge, Massachusetts. A portion of the park is a segment of the Mass Central Rail Trail and the East Coast Greenway.
