= Leverett Circle Connector Bridge =

Leverett Circle Connector
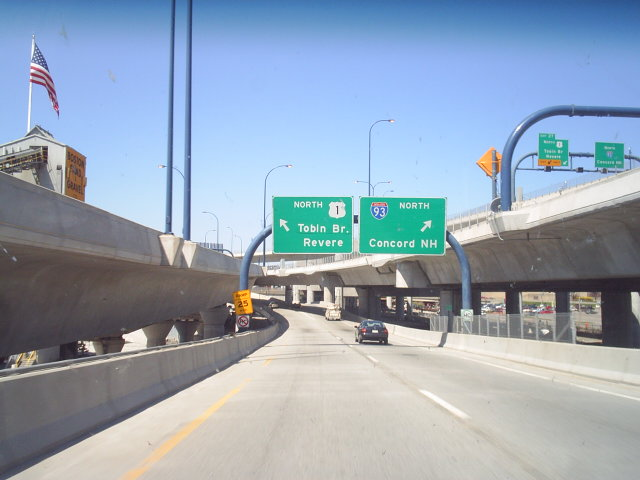
- Leverett Circle Connection, c. 2005
- Coordinates: 42.36909°N 71.06459°W
- Carries: highway access ramp
- Crosses: Charles River
- Locale: Boston, Massachusetts

Characteristics
- Design: Box girder bridge
- Material: Steel
- Total length: 1.7 miles (2.7 km)

History
- Opened: October 7, 1999

Location
- Interactive map of Leverett Circle Connector

The Leverett Circle Connector Bridge is a 1.7 mile-long highway bridge over the Charles River in Boston, Massachusetts, carrying two lanes each of northbound and southbound traffic. It connects to Interstate 93 (I-93) at the northern end (exit 18, formerly 26 from I-93 south) and splits at the southern end, providing direct access to both Storrow Drive and Leverett Circle in Boston. Going northbound, there is also a fork which provides access to the City Square Tunnel under Charlestown to proceed on U.S. Route 1 (US 1) northbound via the Tobin Bridge.

The span was built in conjunction with the more dramatic Leonard P. Zakim Bunker Hill Bridge as part of the Central Artery/Tunnel Project, widely known as the Big Dig. During construction, the Leverett Circle Connector Bridge was sometimes called "Baby Bridge". The bridge opened for traffic on October 7, 1999, at a cost of $22.27 million (equivalent to $39.3 million in 2024).

Also known as the Storrow Drive Connector, it is the largest steel box girder bridge in the United States. It was the winner of a July 2001 National Steel Bridge Alliance (NSBA) "prize bridge" award. Its weaving design was determined by the other major structures involved in the Big Dig but unlike other parts of the project, it was finished eight days ahead of schedule.

== Major intersections ==
The entire route is in Boston, Suffolk County. All exits are unnumbered.

Location	mi	km	Destinations	Notes
West End	0.0	0.0	Route 28 north (O'Brien Highway) – Leverett Circle, North Station	At-grade intersection; North Station access via Nashua Street
West End	0.2	0.32	Route 28 south / Route 3 north (Storrow Drive)	Southbound exit and northbound entrance; no commercial vehicles
Charles River	0.4– 0.5	0.64– 0.80	Bridge	
Charlestown	0.7	1.1	US 1 north (Tobin Bridge) – Revere	E-ZPass or pay-by-mail tolls on bridge; loop ramp via City Square Tunnel
Charlestown	1.7	2.7	I-93 north – Concord, NH	Exit 18 on I-93; Somerville city line
1.000 mi = 1.609 km; 1.000 km = 0.621 mi: Electronic toll collection; Incomplete access

== Gallery ==
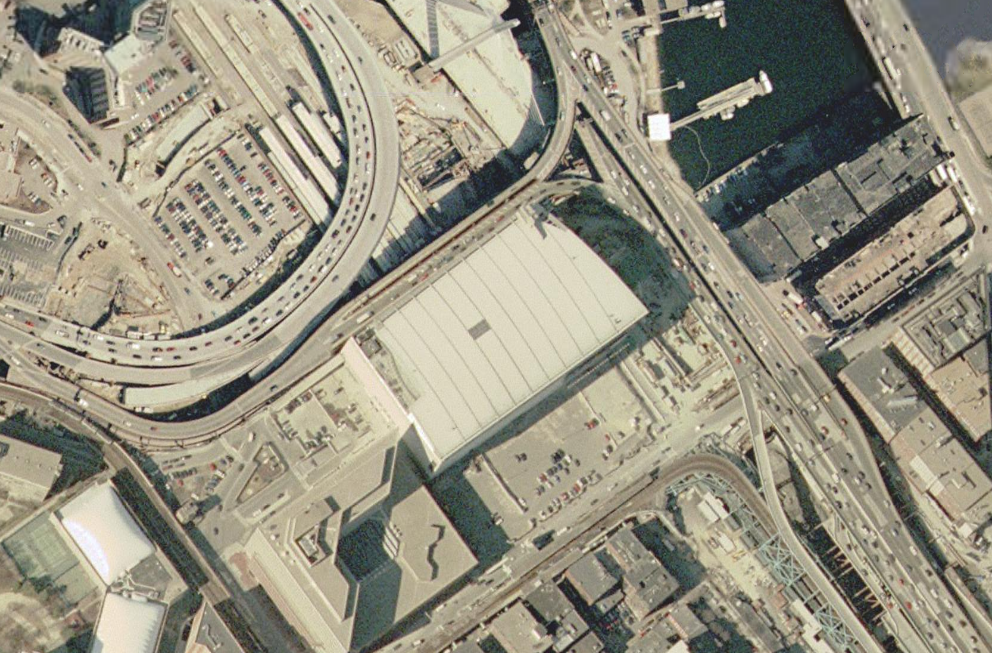
Leverett Circle as seen behind North Station during Big Dig construction.

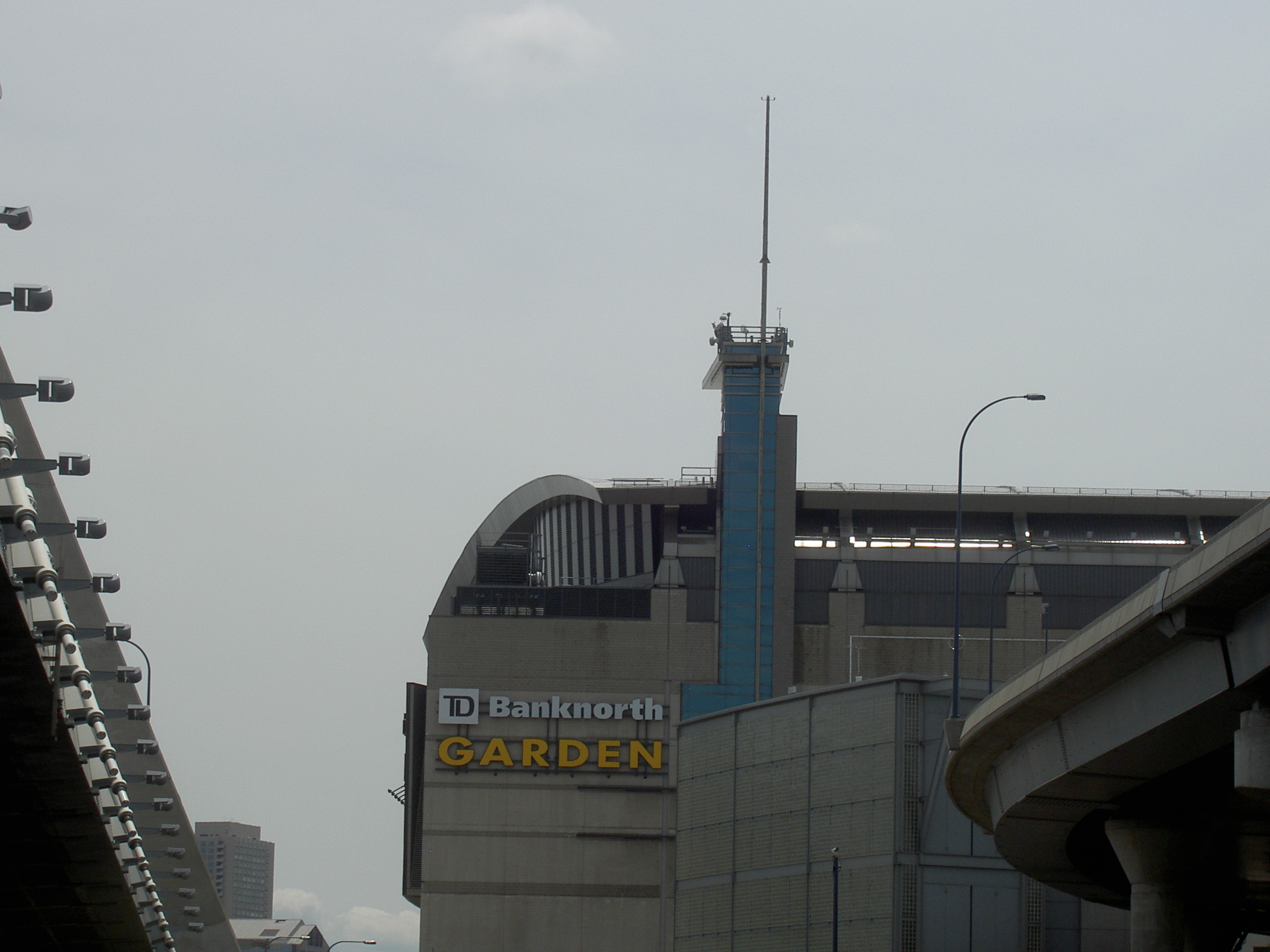
Part of the rebuilt connector bridge at right.
