= Leonard P. Zakim Bunker Hill Memorial Bridge =

Cable-stayed bridge in Boston, Massachusetts

Zakim Bunker Hill Bridge
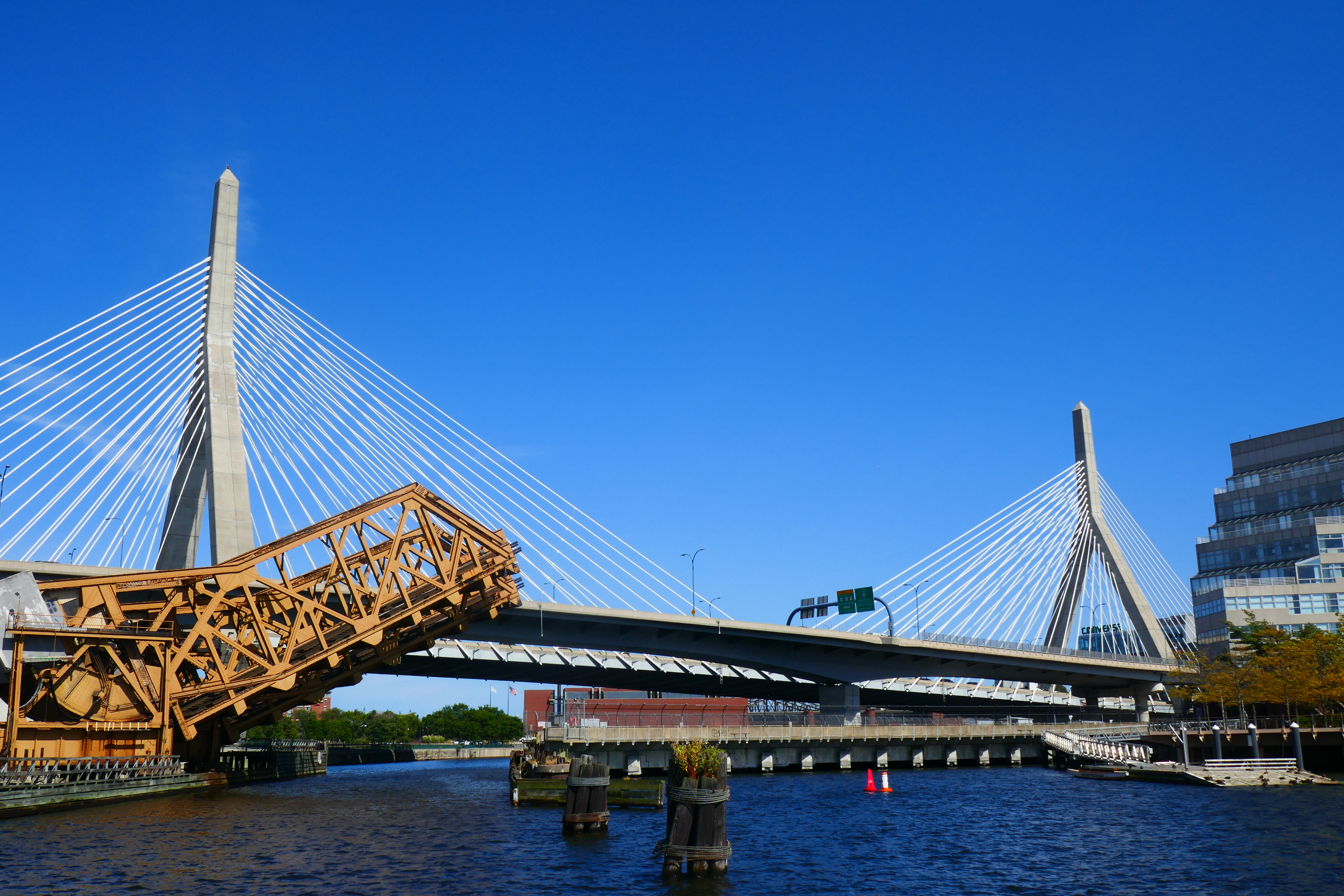
- Zakim Bunker Hill Bridge, alongside the Leverett Circle Connector Bridge, 2017
- Coordinates: 42°22′08″N 71°03′48″W
- Carries: 10 lanes of I-93 / US 1
- Crosses: Charles River, MBTA Orange Line
- Locale: Boston, Massachusetts (North End–Charlestown)
- Official name: Leonard P. Zakim Bunker Hill Memorial Bridge
- Owner: Commonwealth of Massachusetts
- Maintained by: Massachusetts Department of Transportation

Characteristics
- Design: Cable-stayed bridge
- Material: Steel, prestressed concrete
- Total length: 1,432 ft (436 m)
- Width: 183 ft (56 m)
- Height: 270 ft (82 m)
- Longest span: 745 ft (227 m)
- Clearance below: 40 ft (12 m)

History
- Construction cost: $105 million
- Opened: March 30, 2003 (northbound); December 20, 2003 (southbound)

Location
- Interactive map of Zakim Bunker Hill Bridge

The Leonard P. Zakim Bunker Hill Memorial Bridge (/ˈzeɪkəm/; also known as "The Zakim") is a cable-stayed bridge completed in 2003 across the Charles River in Boston, Massachusetts. It replaced the Charlestown High Bridge, an older truss bridge constructed in the 1950s.

The bridge and connecting tunnel were built as part of the Big Dig, the largest highway construction project in the United States. The bridge's unique styling quickly became an icon for Boston, often featured in the backdrop of national news channels to establish location, and included on tourist souvenirs. The bridge is commonly referred to as the "Zakim Bridge" or "Bunker Hill Bridge" by residents of nearby Charlestown.

The Leverett Circle Connector Bridge was constructed in conjunction with the Zakim Bridge, allowing some traffic to bypass it.

== Design ==
The bridge concept was designed by Swiss civil engineer Christian Menn in collaboration with bridge designer Miguel Rosales and its design was engineered by American civil engineer Ruchu Hsu with Parsons Brinckerhoff (now WSP USA). Wallace Floyd Associates, sub-consultants to Bechtel/Parsons Brinckerhoff, was the lead architect/urban designer and facilitated community participation during the design process.

The bridge is a cable-stayed bridge in a harp configuration with cradles carrying each strand through its pylon. The top of each pylon is shaped like an obelisk, echoing the nearby Bunker Hill Monument.

The main portion of the Zakim Bridge carries four lanes each way (northbound and southbound) of Interstate 93 (concurrent with U.S. Route 1) between the Thomas P. "Tip" O'Neill Jr. Tunnel and the elevated highway to the north. Two additional lanes are cantilevered outside the cables, which carry northbound traffic from the Sumner Tunnel and North End on-ramp. These lanes merge with the main highway north of the bridge. I-93 heads toward New Hampshire as the "Northern Expressway", and US 1 splits from the Interstate and travels northeast toward Massachusetts' North Shore communities, crossing the Mystic River via the Tobin Bridge.

The 1975-built MBTA Orange Line's Haymarket North Extension tunnel lies beneath the bridge.

== Dedication ==
The bridge's full name commemorates Boston area leader and civil rights activist Leonard P. Zakim, who championed "building bridges between peoples", and the Battle of Bunker Hill.

The bridge was dedicated on October 4, 2002, in a ceremony held on the new span. The dedication speakers included members of Zakim's family, government officials, and a performance of the song "Thunder Road" by Bruce Springsteen.

Introducing the song, Springsteen said about Zakim, "... I knew him a little bit during the last year of his life, he was one of those people whose, intensity, inner spirit you could feel even when he was very ill, ... we honor his memory obviously not with this beautiful bridge, very lovely, but by continuing on in his fight for social justice."

== Landscape design and public art ==
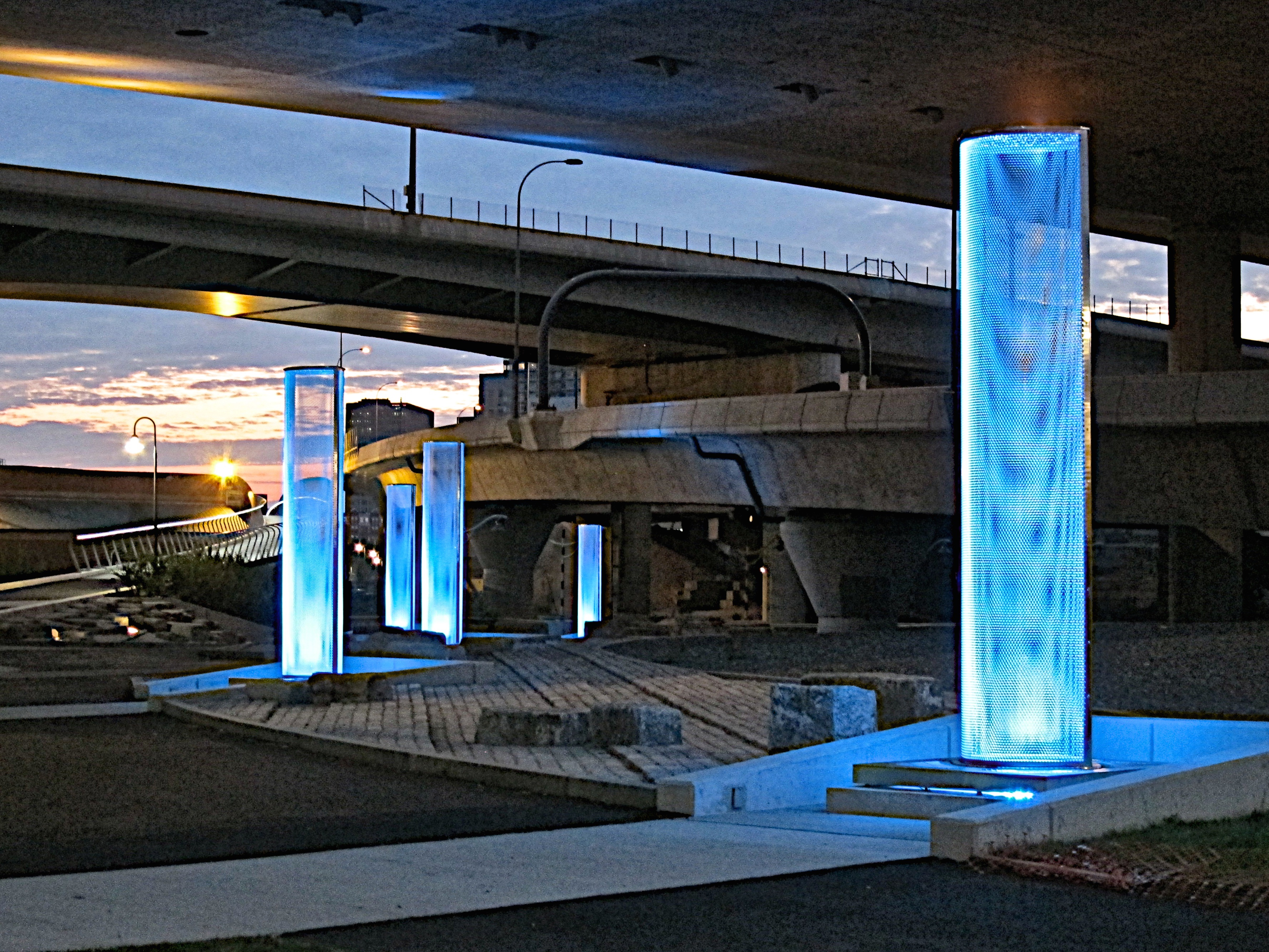
Under Zakim Bridge, Five Beacons for the Lost Half Mile, blue phase

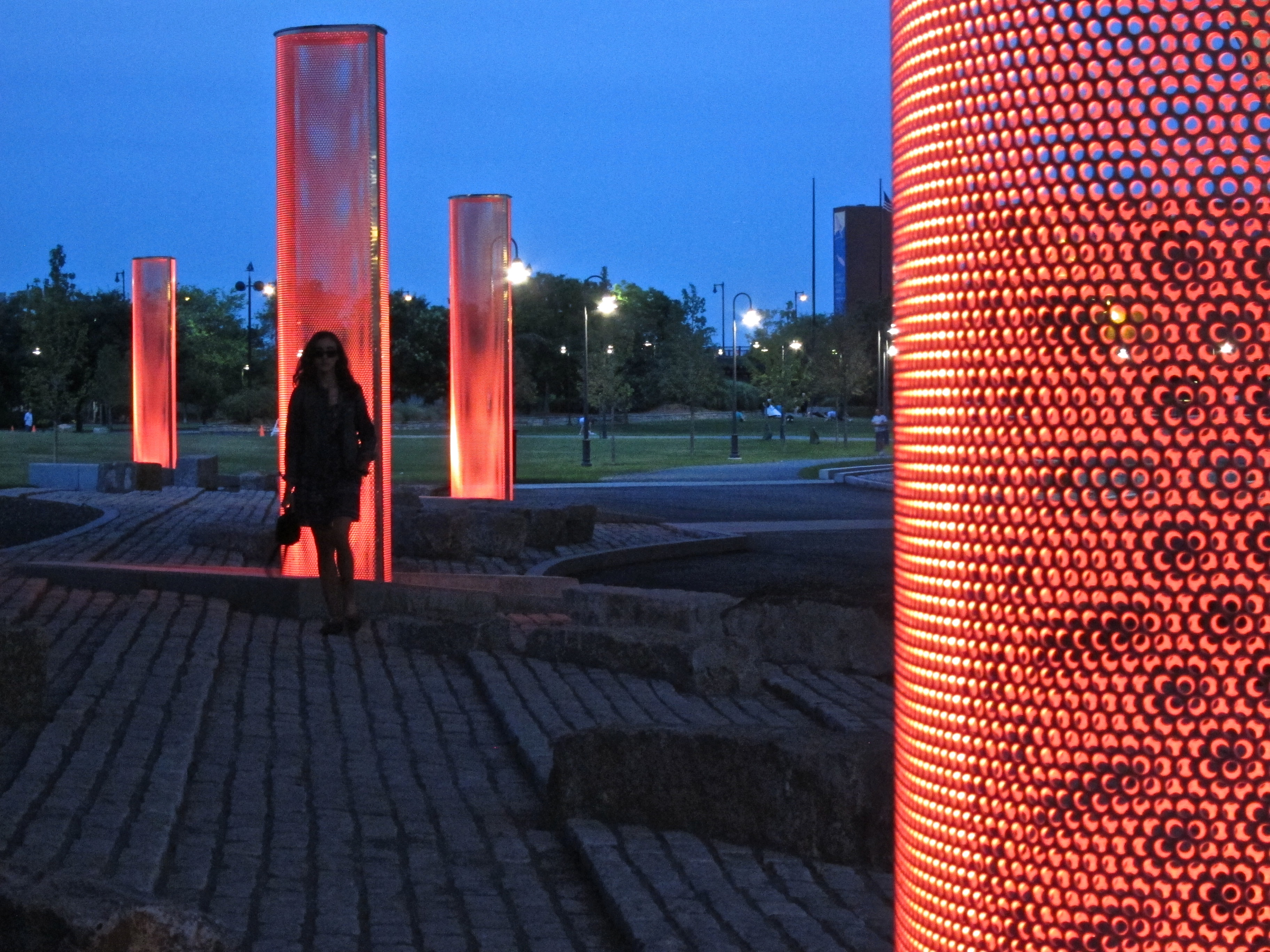
Five Beacons for the Lost Half Mile, orange phase, View to West

Placement of footings for the Zakim Bridge required environmental permits to relocate areas of open water surface, changing the contour of the Charles River shoreline. The process of landscape design and environmental mitigation under the bridge deck and around the bridge supports allowed for the creation of a new and accessible public landscape designed by Carol R. Johnson Associates. This under-bridge landscape contains a series of perforated stainless steel lighting-based public artworks, entitled Five Beacons for the Lost Half Mile.

Pedestrians and cyclists are able to travel from Charlestown toward Cambridge over the adjacent North Bank Bridge to North Point Park. This bridge is a link in the Charles River Bike Path and a segment of the Mass Central Rail Trail and the East Coast Greenway.

== Gallery ==
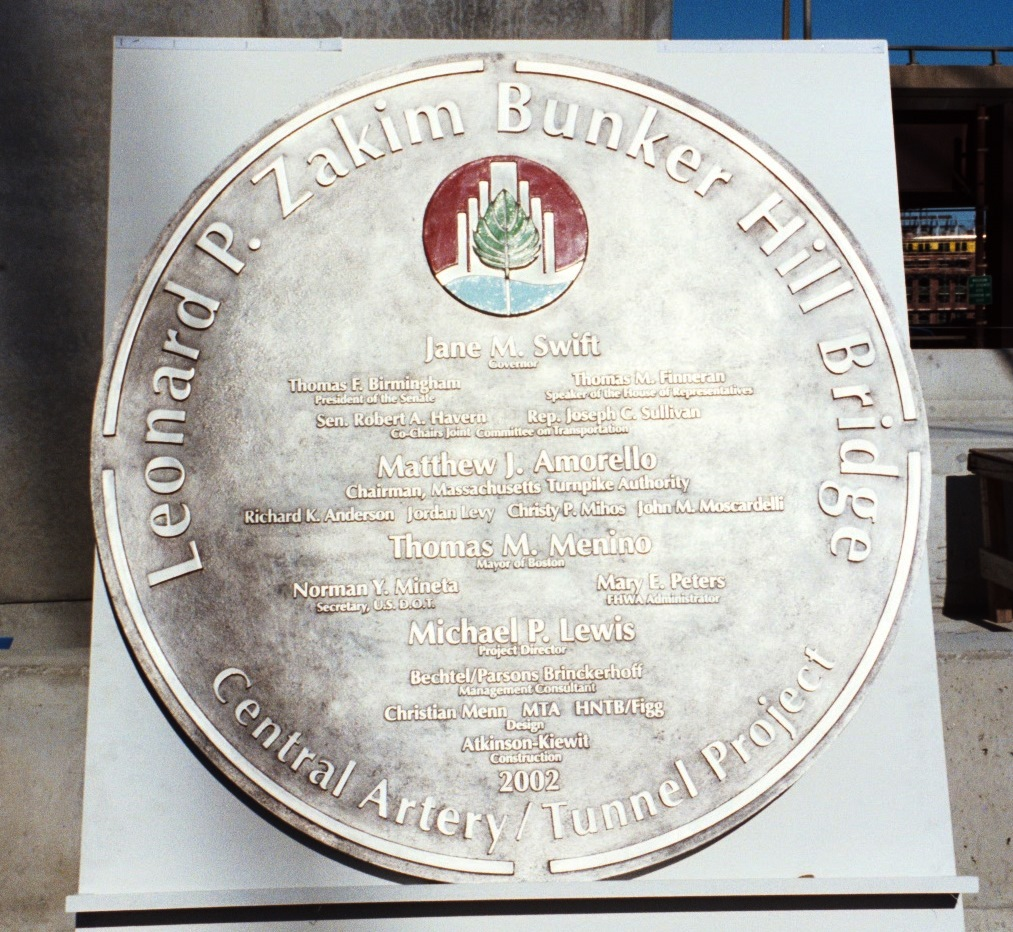
Dedication plaque for the bridge

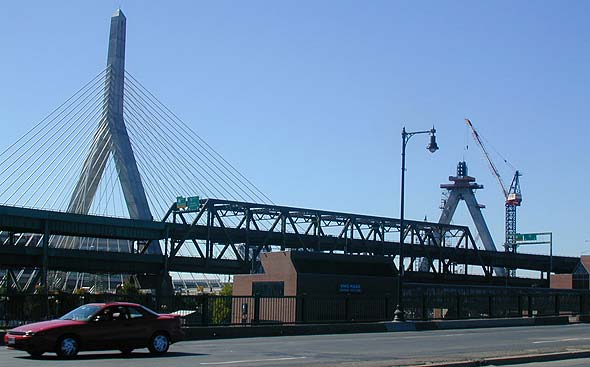
Zakim Bridge under construction behind the Charlestown High Bridge in 2000

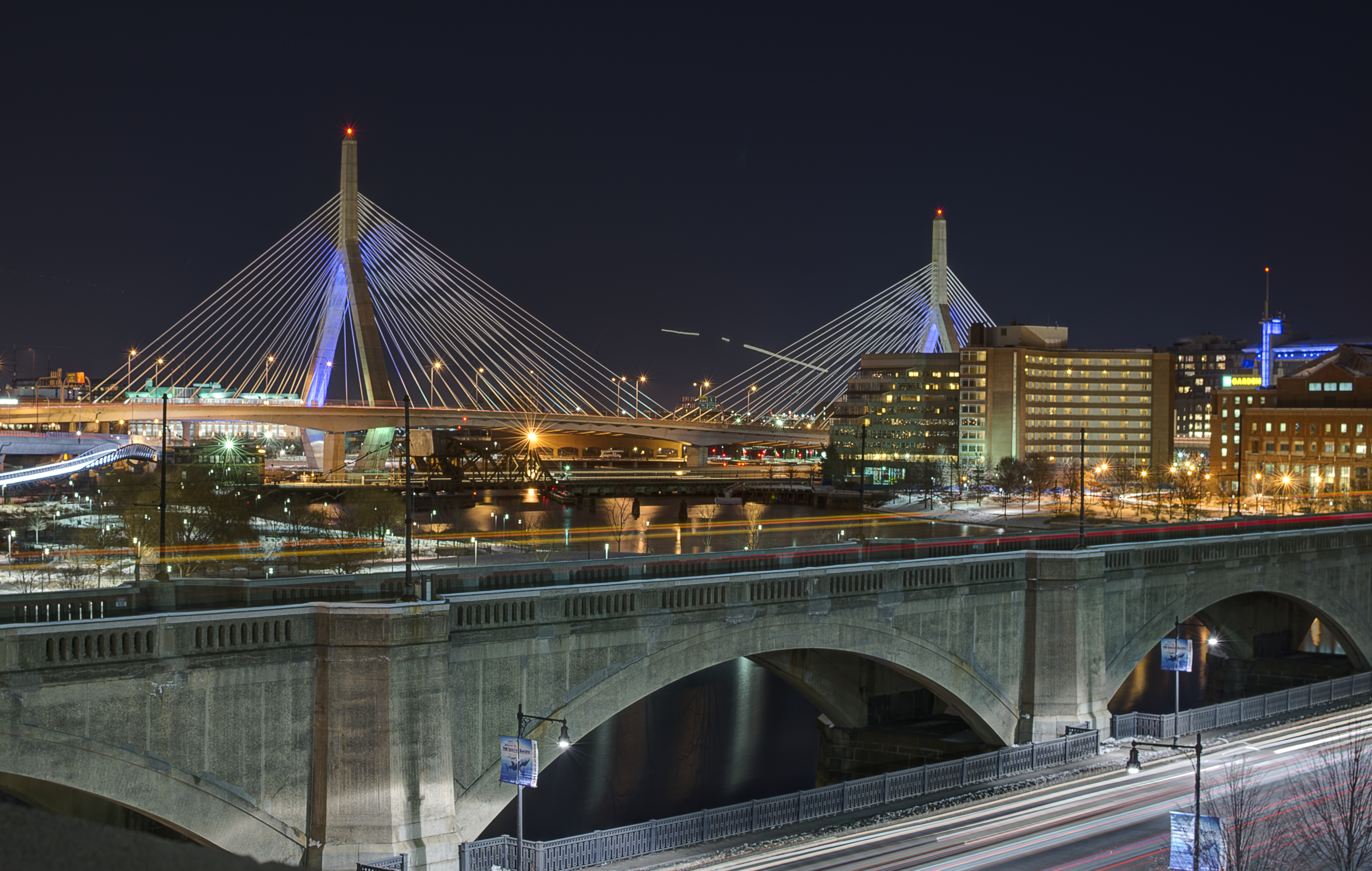
Nighttime view with the Lechmere Viaduct

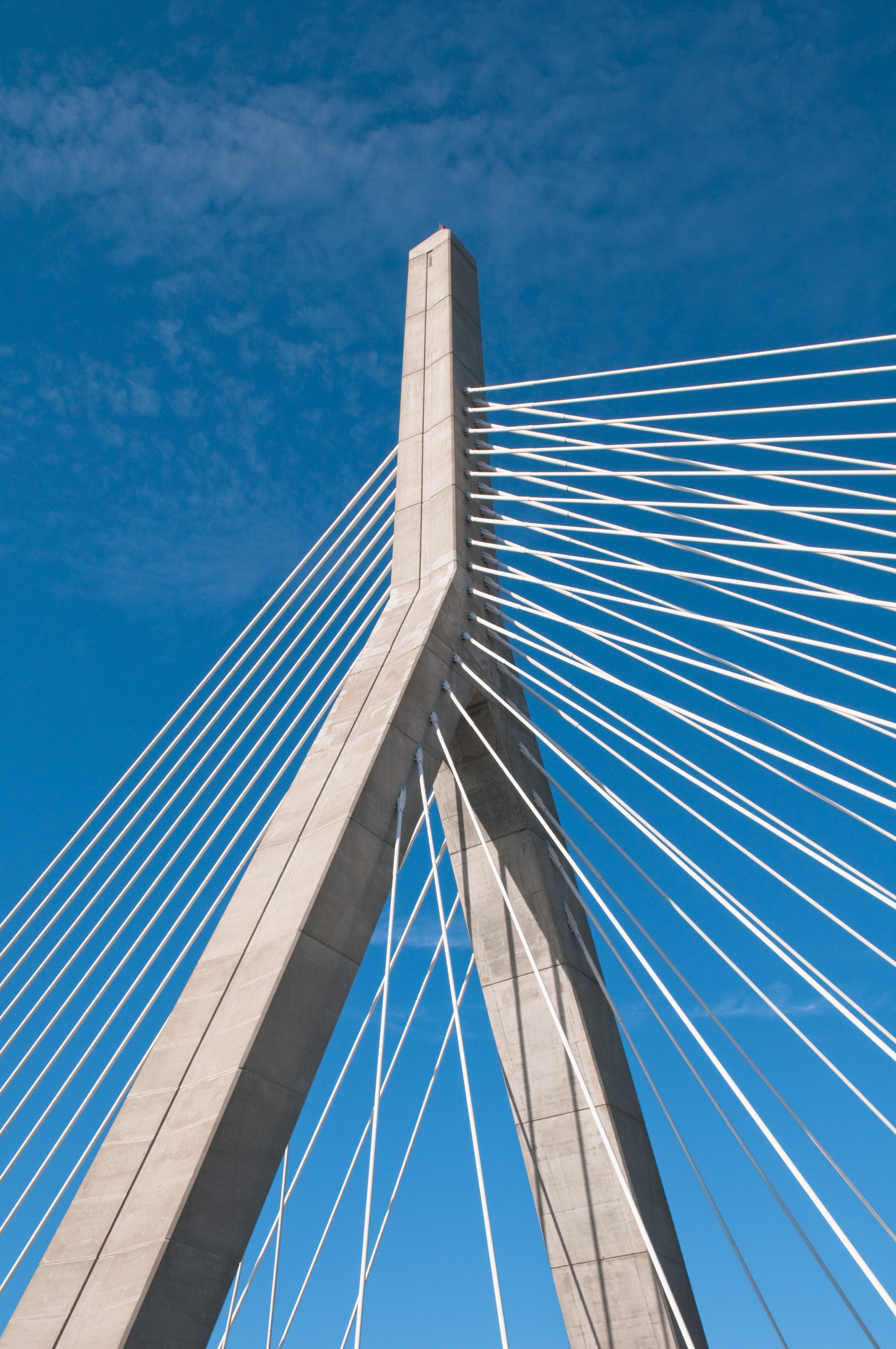
Detail of the cabling and tower on the bridge

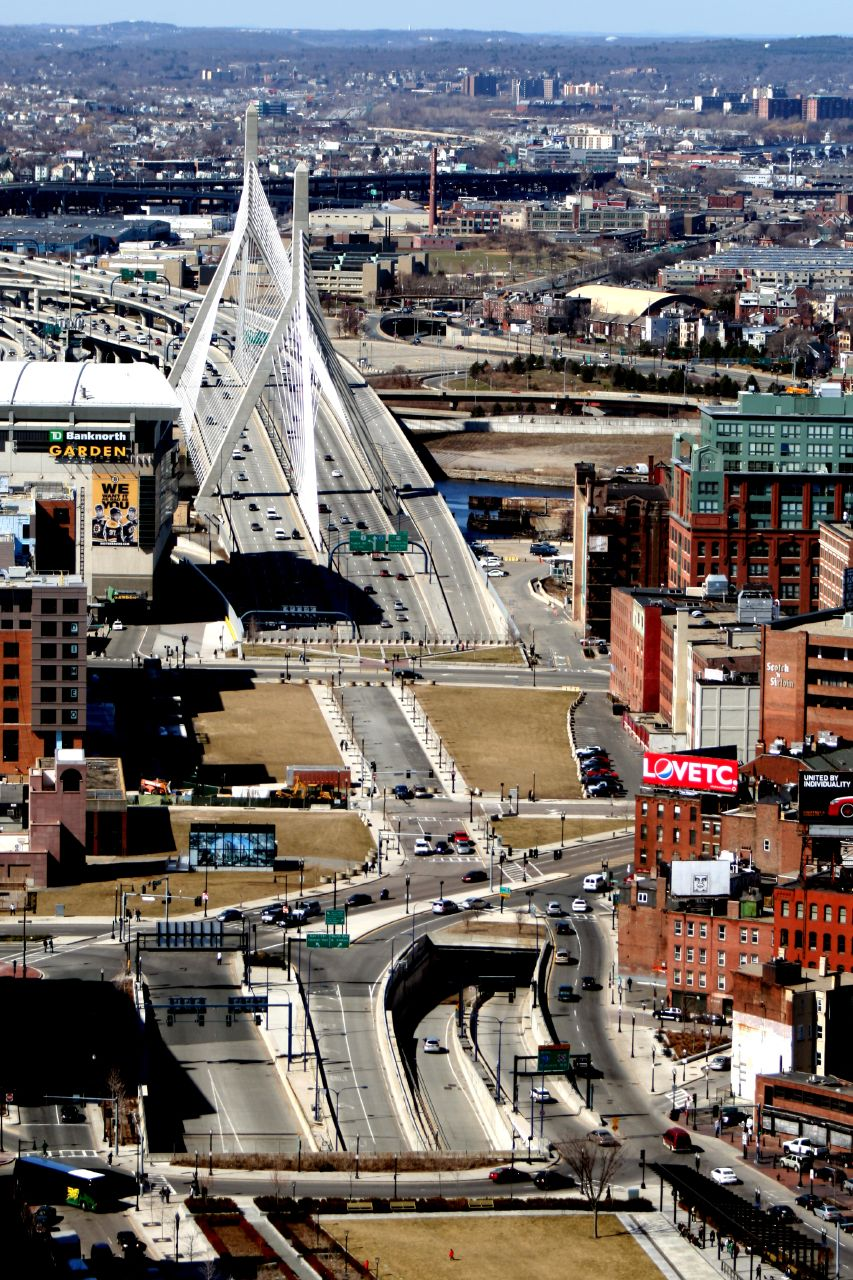
The bridge and the northern portion of the Rose Fitzgerald Kennedy Greenway

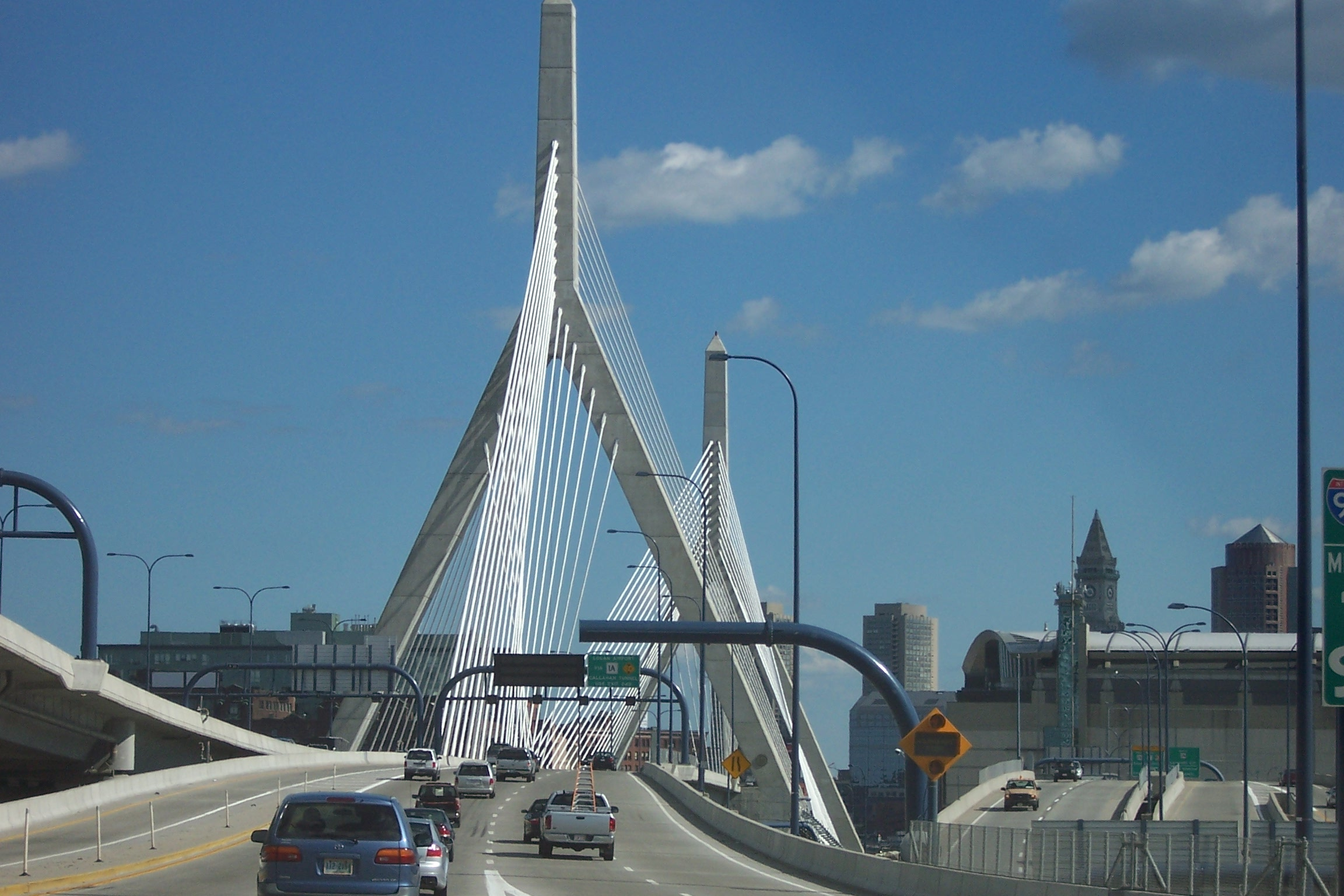
View traveling south into Boston

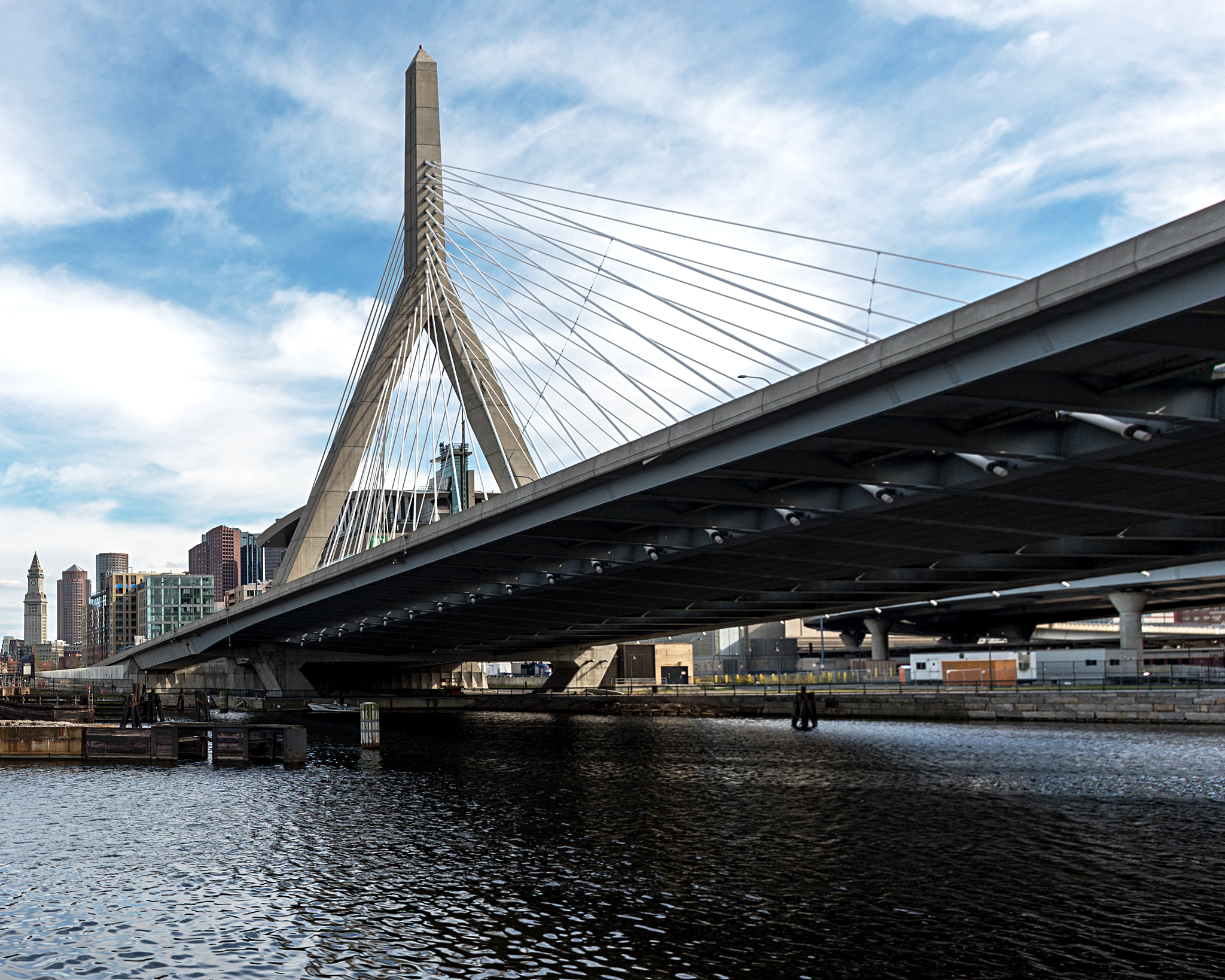
View from Paul Revere Park in Charlestown

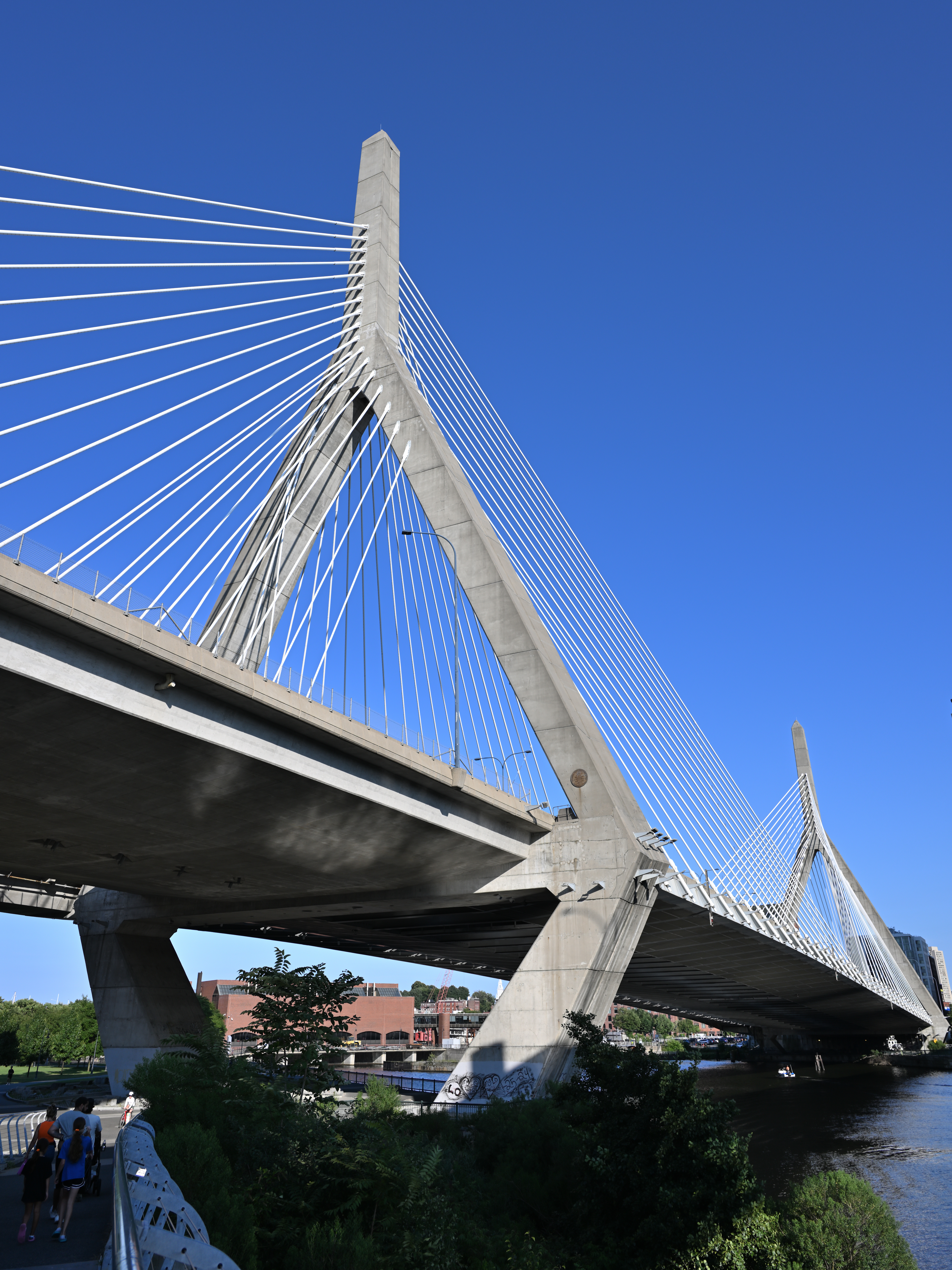
View from below

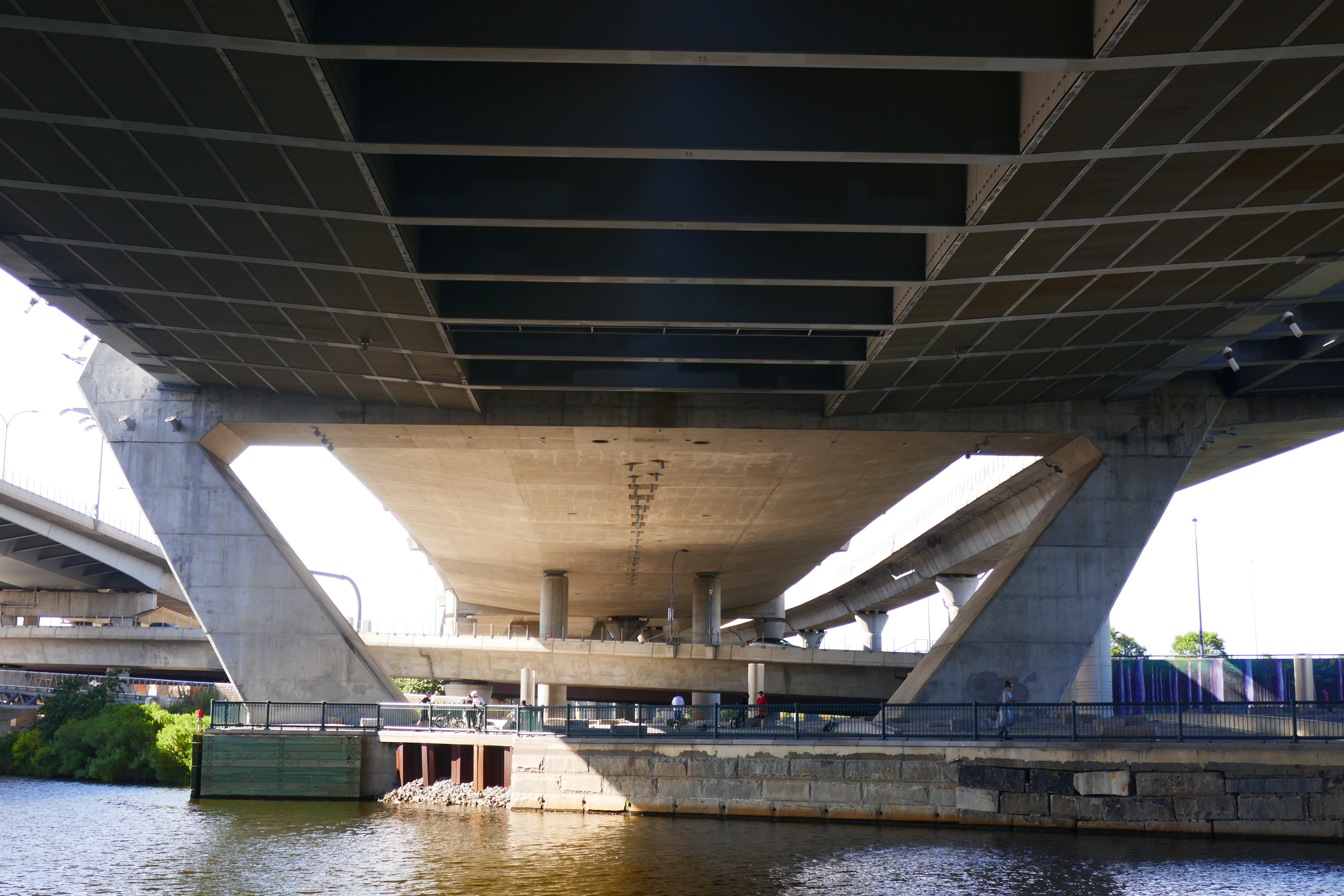
View from a Charles River tour boat

== See also ==
- Josh Zakim
- List of crossings of the Charles River
