= List of Charles River boathouses =

The Charles River in Massachusetts has a significant number of boathouses on its banks, from its mouth at Boston Harbor to its source at Echo Lake in Hopkinton.

The boathouses are mostly situated along the Boston and Cambridge banks of the Charles River Basin, upstream as far as the Arsenal Street Bridge, and downstream as far as the Charles River Dam. Many of the boathouses belong to universities, including Boston University, Harvard University, the Massachusetts Institute of Technology, and Northeastern University. Other boathouses belong to private clubs, some of which date back to the 19th century, while others belong to non-profit organizations dedicated to making the river accessible to the public for various types of boating. There are a modest number of for-profit boathouses that offer public boating services on the river above the Watertown Dam. Charles River Canoe & Kayak, which operates a boathouse in Newton, also provides rental services at other locations on the river.

The biggest event of the year involving the boathouses is the Head of the Charles Regatta, held every October. The houses see usage nearly year-round, weather permitting and pending the icing over of the Charles in winter months.

== Listings ==
This list starts from the mouth of the river, with the first house near the Charles River Dam Bridge, and continues upstream. The nearest crossing to each boathouse is marked with an asterisk (*).

Boathouse name	Location	Owner	Downstream crossing	Upstream crossing	Built	Notes
DCR boathouse	1 Edwin H. Land Blvd., Cambridge; 42.36839°N 71.073348°W	Massachusetts Department of Conservation and Recreation	*Charles River Dam Bridge	Longfellow Bridge	c. 1910	Located to the north of the Museum of Science parking garage at the mouth of the Lechmere Canal, this boathouse dates to the period of the first dam's construction.
Charlesgate Yacht Club	20 Cambridge Parkway, Cambridge	Charlesgate Yacht Club	*Charles River Dam Bridge	Longfellow Bridge		This club has small structures on its docks, and no land-based facilities.
Community Boating Boathouse	21 David Mugar Way, Boston MA; 42.359836°N 71.073015°W	Community Boating, Inc	*Longfellow Bridge	Harvard Bridge	1941	Community Boating is a non-profit operation providing sailing lessons and access to small sailboats.
Union Boat Club Clubhouse	144 Chestnut Street, Boston MA; 42.357815°N 71.073374°W	Union Boat Club	*Longfellow Bridge	Harvard Bridge	1851? (founding of the club)	The Union Boat Club is the longest continuously operating rowing club in Boston.
MIT Sailing Pavilion	Memorial Drive, Cambridge MA	Massachusetts Institute of Technology (MIT)	Longfellow Bridge	*Harvard Bridge	1935	The first facility constructed for college sailing
Charles River Yacht Club	Memorial Drive, Cambridge MA	Charles River Yacht Club	Longfellow Bridge	*Harvard Bridge		
H.W. Pierce Boathouse	409 Memorial Drive, Cambridge MA	Massachusetts Institute of Technology (MIT)	*Harvard Bridge	Boston University Bridge	September 9, 1966	Also called the "MIT Boathouse".
DeWolfe Boathouse	619 Memorial Drive, Cambridge MA	Boston University	Harvard Bridge	*Boston University Bridge	1999	Commonly referred to as the "BU Boathouse".
Riverside Boat Club	796 Memorial Drive, Cambridge MA	Riverside Boat Club	Boston University Bridge	*River Street Bridge	1912	The Riverside Boat Club was founded in 1869. Those wishing to join must go through a five step application process before becoming a provisional member. Used by Northeastern University from 1963 to 1990.
BU Sailing Pavilion	Storrow Drive, Boston MA		*Boston University Bridge	River Street Bridge		Boathouse for the Boston University Dinghy Sailors (BUDS)
Weld Boathouse	971 Memorial Drive, Cambridge MA	Harvard University	John W. Weeks Bridge	*Anderson Memorial Bridge	1889 main section built in 1906.	Commonly referred to as the "Radcliffe Boathouse". Home of Harvard's women's rowing team. It is also home to Harvard University's club sculling program, the Harvard Kennedy School Rowing Club, and the intramural crew teams for Harvard College's houses.
Newell Boathouse	65 Soldiers Field Road, Boston (Allston), MA	Harvard University	*Anderson Memorial Bridge	Eliot Bridge	1900	Home of the men's heavyweight and lightweight rowing teams and the Harvard University Boat Club
Cambridge Boat Club	2 Gerry's Landing, Cambridge MA	Cambridge Boat Club (CBC)	Anderson Memorial Bridge	*Eliot Bridge	1909? (founding of the club)	A 325-member private rowing and social club involved in a variety of outreach projects. Also home to the Cambridge Rindge & Latin School rowing team.
BB&N Boathouse	Cambridge MA	Buckingham Browne & Nichols	Anderson Memorial Bridge	*Eliot Bridge		Immediately adjacent to the Cambridge Boat Club.
Winsor and Belmont Hill Boathouse	5 Greenough Blvd, Cambridge MA	The Winsor and Belmont Hill Schools	*Eliot Bridge	Arsenal Street Bridge	2002	Eight time New England Youth 4+ Champions (2003–2010)
Henderson Boathouse	1350 Soldiers Field Road, Boston (Brighton) MA	Northeastern University	Eliot Bridge	*Arsenal Street Bridge; 42°21′51″N 71°8′29.7″W	1989	Cost $2.5 Million.
Harry Parker Boathouse	20 Nonantum Road, Boston (Brighton) MA; 42°21′31″N 71°9′56″W	Community Rowing, Inc. (CRI)	*North Beacon Street Bridge	Watertown Bridge	2008	30,000 sq ft. building, cost $11.45 Million. A nonprofit facility open to the public, offering a wide range of rowing classes and recreational and competitive teams for people of all ages and abilities. Also home to the Boston College women's and men's rowing teams.
Newton Boathouse	2401 Commonwealth Avenue (Route 30), Newton MA; 42°20.683′N 71°15.582′W	Boston Outdoor Recreation	Gold Star Mothers Bridge (Prospect Street, Waltham)	*Commonwealth Avenue (Rt. 30)		Does rentals, sales, and instructional programs.
Lasell College Boathouse	Charles Street, Auburndale, Newton, MA; 42.341550°N 71.258297°W	Lasell College	I95-I90 connector bridge	*closed footbridge between Charles Street, Auburndale and Recreation Road, Weston		Used primarily by the Noble and Greenough School, as well as a recreational rowing program at Lasell College.
Nahanton Park Boathouse	Nahanton Street, Newton MA; 42.29731°N 71.207421°W	Charles River Canoe and Kayak	*Nahanton Street Bridge	Needham Street Bridge		Does rentals, sales, and instructional programs.
Dexter Southfield Boathouse	100 Bridge Street, Dedham MA; 42°16′04.9″N 71°10′30.2″W	Dexter Southfield School	*Cawley Memorial Bridge (Route 109)	Ames Street Bridge		
Noble and Greenough Boathouse	Campus Dr., Dedham MA; 42°15′30.5″N 71°11′17.8″W	Noble and Greenough School	*Route 109 Bridge	I-95 Bridge		
