= List of bridges in Boston =

Notable bridges in Boston include:

- Anderson Memorial Bridge
- Andrew P. McArdle Memorial Bridge
- Arsenal Street Bridge
- Arthur Fiedler Footbridge
- Boston Public Garden Foot Bridge
- Boston University Bridge
- Bowker Overpass
- Charles River Dam Bridge
- Charlestown Bridge
- Chelsea Street Bridge
- Congress Street Bridge
- Eliot Bridge
- Evelyn Moakley Bridge
- Frances Appleton Bridge
- Grand Junction Railroad Bridge
- Great Bridge
- Harvard Bridge
- John W. Weeks Bridge
- Leonard P. Zakim Bunker Hill Memorial Bridge
- Leverett Circle Connector Bridge
- Long Island Bridge
- Longfellow Bridge
- North Beacon Street Bridge
- Northern Avenue Bridge
- Paul's Bridge
- River Street Bridge
- Summer Street Bridge
- Tobin Bridge
- Warren Bridge
- Western Avenue Bridge
- William Felton "Bill" Russell Bridge, Boston

== See also ==
- List of crossings of the Charles River
