= Ronald Lee Fleming =

American town planner (1941–2026)

Ronald Lee Fleming (May 13, 1941 – November 10, 2026) was an American town planner who was the founder and president of The Townscape Institute, a not-for-profit public interest planning organization founded in the United States in 1979. He was a fellow of the American Institute of Certified Planners.

== Life and career ==
Fleming attended Pomona College and the Harvard Graduate School of Design. In 2006, he received the William H. Whyte Lifetime Achievement Award from Partners for Livable Communities in Washington, D.C. He also won several awards for his 1998 Radnor Gateways Enhancement Strategy in Radnor, Pennsylvania.

He wrote several books on the urban landscape covering preservation, corporate visual responsibility and placemaking, most recently The Art of Placemaking: Interpreting Community Through Public Art and Urban Design. According to WorldCat, the book is held in 335 libraries He was instrumental in the early Main Street Revitalization movement of the 1970s.

Fleming resided in Cambridge, Massachusetts and Newport, Rhode Island, at Bellevue House. Additionally, he was one of the Directors and Officers of Fathers & Families, a fathers' rights organization.

Fleming died on November 10, 2026, at the age of 85.

== Publications ==
- Fleming, Ronald Lee. The Art of Placemaking: Interpreting Community Through Public Art and Urban Design. London: Merrell, 2007. ISBN 9781858943718
- Fleming, Ronald Lee, Rachel Goldsmith, and J. A. Chewning. Saving Face: How Corporate Franchise Design Can Respect Community Identity. Chicago, IL: American Planning Association, Planning Advisory Service, 1994. OCLC 30925448
- Fleming, Ronald Lee, and Renata von Tscharner. Place Makers: Creating Public Art That Tells You Where You Are : with an Essay on Planning and Policy. Boston: Harcourt Brace Jovanovich, 1987. ISBN 9780151720002

Fleming, Ronald Lee. Facade Stories: Changing Faces of Main Street : Storefronts and How to Care for Them. Cambridge, MA: Townscape Institute, 1982. ISBN 9780803823983

- Fleming, Ronald Lee, Renata von Tscharner, and George Melrod. Place Makers: Public Art That Tells You Where You Are. Cambridge, MA.: Townscape Institute, 1981. OCLC 30925448
