= Riverside Boat Club =

American rowing club

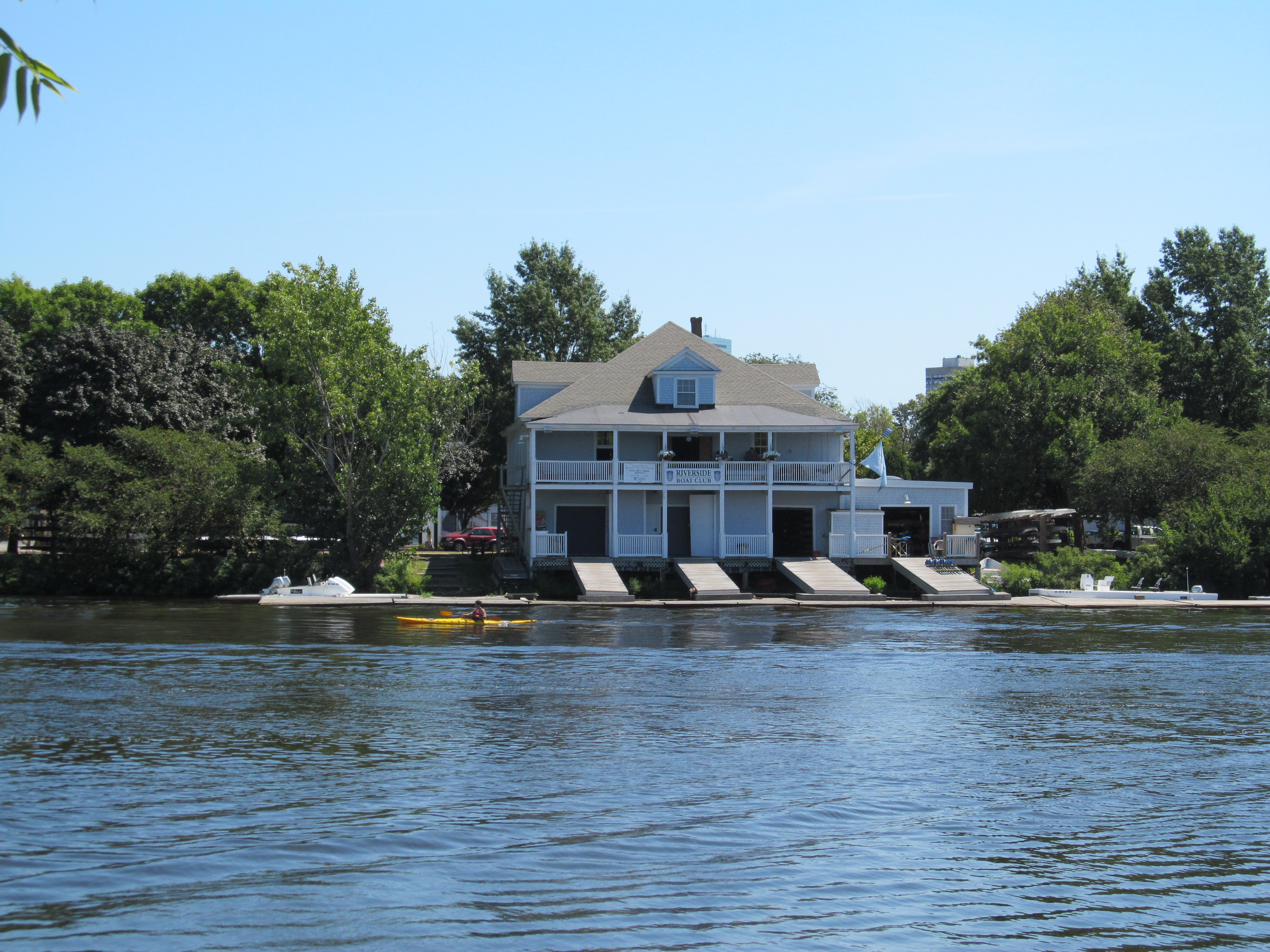
- Location: Cambridge, Massachusetts
- Coordinates: 42°21′29.1″N 71°6′57.1″W
- Home water: Charles River
- Founded: 1869
- Website: www.riversideboatclub.com

Notable members
- See below

The Riverside Boat Club is a private, non-profit, rowing club on the Charles River in Cambridge, Massachusetts, United States of America. Founded in 1869 by workers from the Riverside Press.

== Prominent members ==
- Lauren Schmetterling - 2016 US Olympic Team member (Women's Open Eight)
- Alex Rothmeier - 2009 US National Team member (Lightweight Men's Pair)
- Hillary Saeger - 2009 US National Team member (Lightweight Women's Quadruple Sculls)
- Stefanie Sydlik - 2009 US National Team member (Lightweight Women's Quadruple Sculls)
- John Wainwright - 2009 US National Team member (Lightweight Men's Pair)
- Liane Malcos - 2008 US Olympic Team member (Alternate)
- Will Daly - 2007 US National Team member (Men's Lightweight Eight)
- Andrew Diebold - 2007 US National Team member (Men's Lightweight Eight)
- Jeff Forrester - 2007 US National Team member (Men's Lightweight Eight)
- Esther Lofgren - 2007 US National Team member (Spare)
- John Nichols - 2007 US National Team member (Men's Lightweight Eight)
- Tyler Resch - 2007 US National Team member (Men's Lightweight Eight)
- Greg Ruckman - 2007 US National Team member (Men's Lightweight Eight)
- Andrew Hashway - 2012 US National Team member (Men's Lightweight Eight)
- Bruce Smith - 2007 US National Team Coaching Staff
- Kent Smack - 2001 US National Team member (Men's Double Sculls); 2004 USA Olympic Team

== See also ==
- List of Charles River boathouses
