= Cambridge Boat Club =

Rowing club on the Charles River, Cambridge, Massachusetts, USA

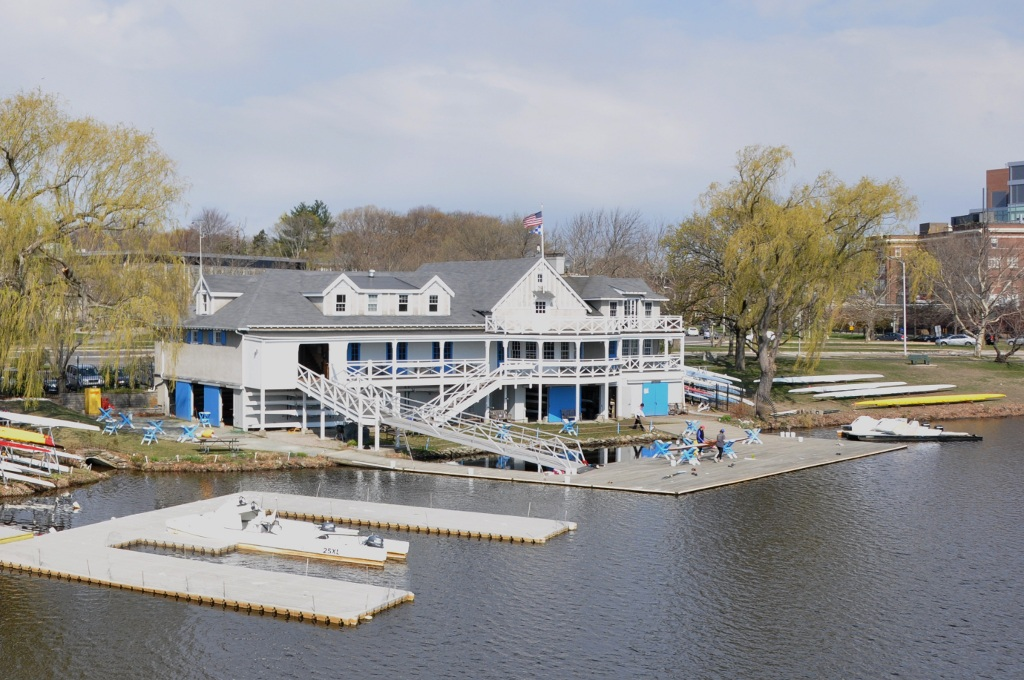
- Location: Cambridge, Massachusetts
- Coordinates: 42°22′20.3″N 71°8′01.7″W
- Home water: Charles River
- Founded: 1909
- Website: www.cambridge-boat-club.org

Notable members
- See below

The Cambridge Boat Club is a private, non-profit, rowing club on the Charles River in Cambridge, Massachusetts, United States of America. Founded on April 7, 1909 by Cambridge residents as an athletic and social resource, Cambridge Boat Club quickly established itself in the rowing community.

When the club opened, it already had membership of over 100, and that number has crept up over the past century. Originally on the North Bank of the Charles near Hawthorne Street, the club moved to its present location at Gerry’s Landing in 1947. In 1965, Cambridge Boat Club members founded the Head of the Charles Regatta, and it has been managed by the Club since. Cambridge Boat Club offers many learn-to-row opportunities, quality equipment, and coaching for members of all levels. Many members of the club are former world champions, olympians, and well-known coaches.

== See also ==
- List of Charles River boathouses
- Head of the Charles Regatta
