= Community Rowing, Inc. =

Non-profit rowing club on the Charles

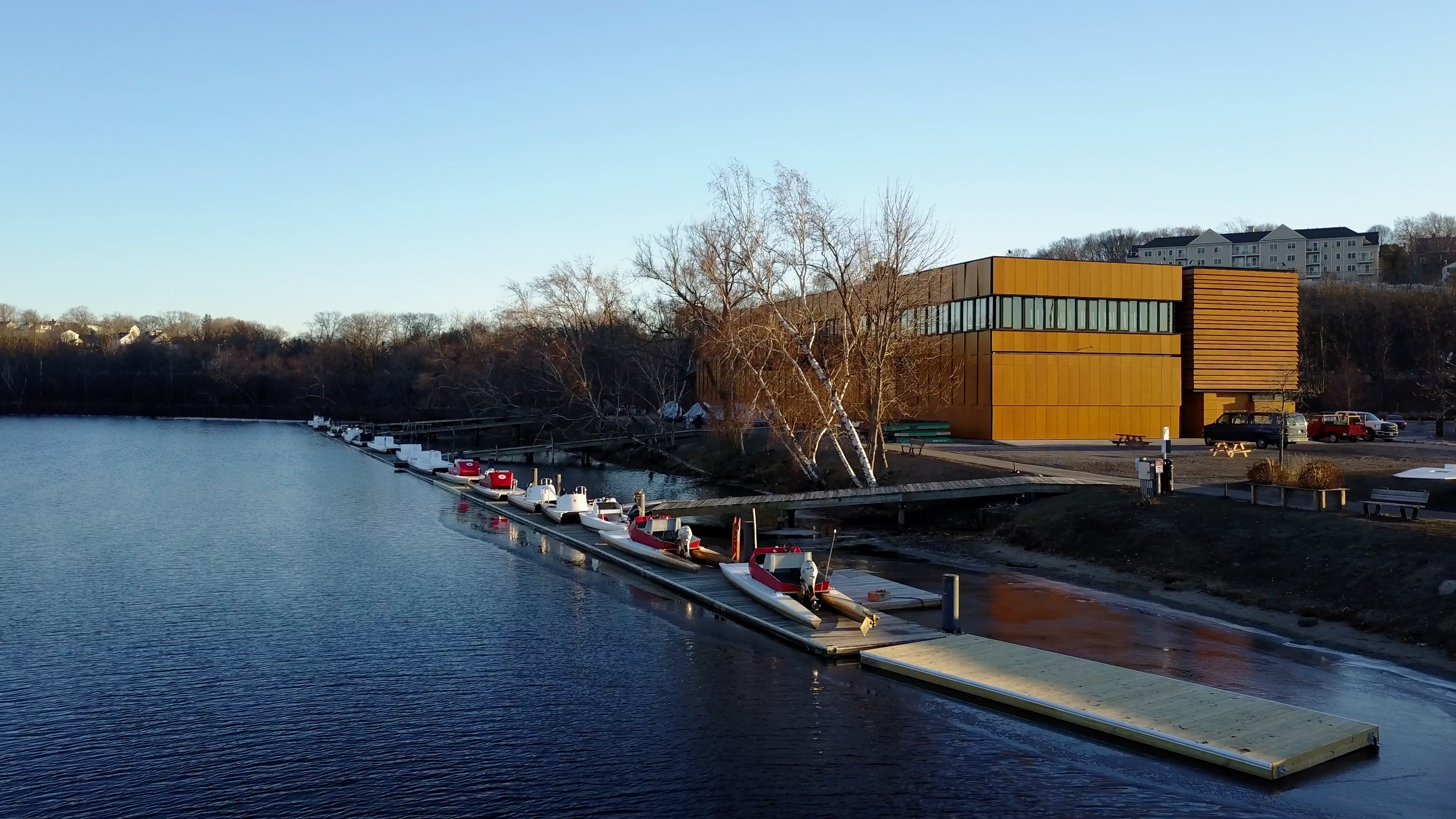
- Harry Parker Boathouse
- Motto: "Rowing For All"
- Location: Brighton, Massachusetts
- Home water: Charles River
- Founded: 1985
- Affiliations: Boston Children's Hospital: Boston Public Schools; Spaulding Rehabilitation Hospital; USRowing
- Website: www.communityrowing.org

Notable members
- Kristin Hedstrom

Community Rowing Inc. (CRI) is a non-profit rowing club located on the Charles River in the Brighton neighborhood of Boston.

== See also ==
- List of Charles River boathouses
- Head of the Charles Regatta
- Harry Parker (rower)
- USRowing
- National Paralympic Committee
