= Community Boating, Inc. =

Sailing organization in Boston

Coordinates: 42.359836°N 71.073051°W

Community Boating Inc.
- Type: Not-for-profit corporation
- Industry: Sailing
- Founded: 1937
- Headquarters: Boston, Massachusetts
- Key people: Joseph Lee Jr, Founder
- Website: community-boating.org

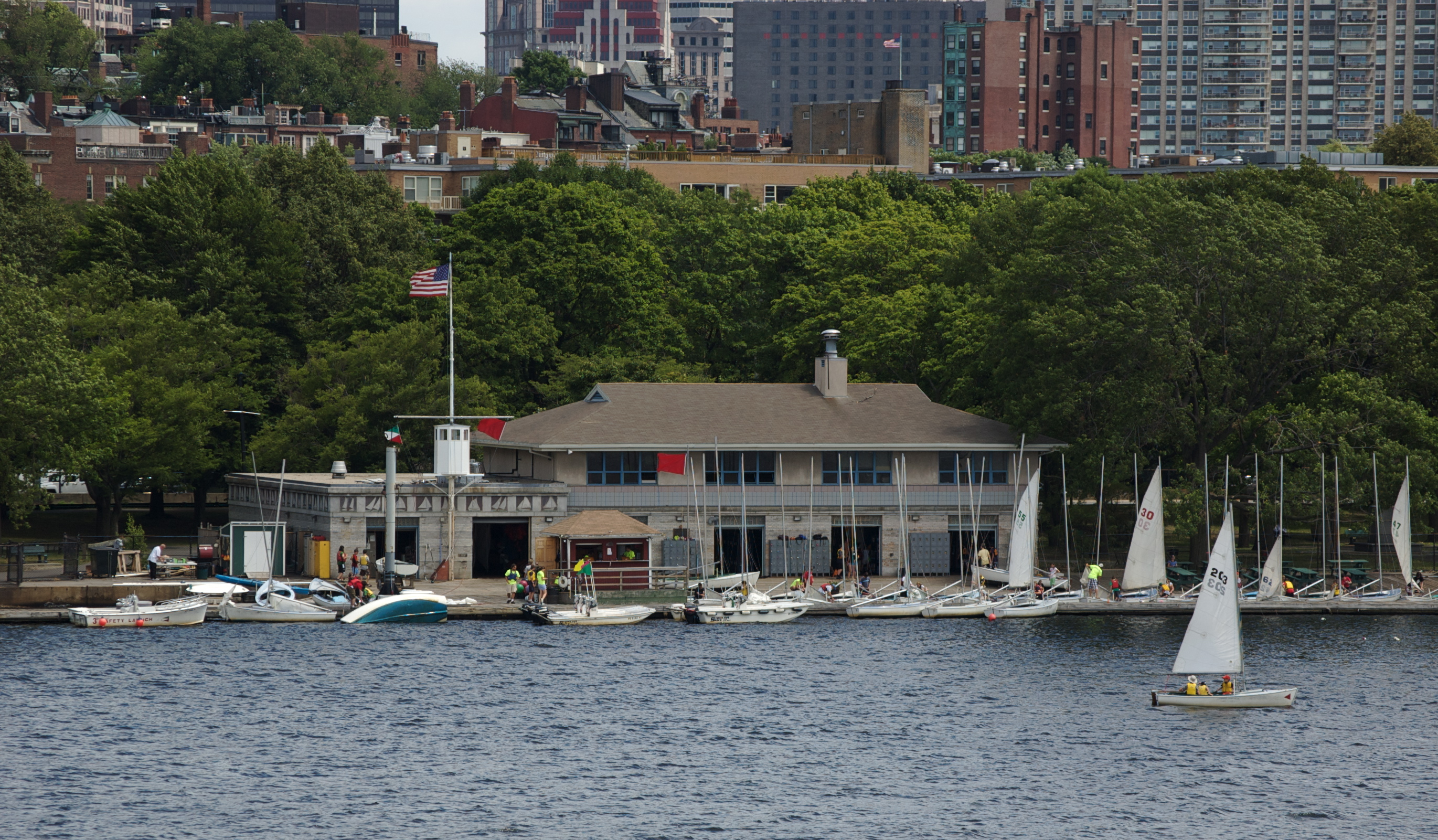
Community Boating Inc. as seen from across the Charles River.

Community Boating, Inc. (CBI) is a public not-for-profit corporation founded in 1937 to teach sailing to those who would not typically have access. CBI was officially incorporated in 1946. Located on the Charles River Esplanade between the Hatch Shell and the Longfellow Bridge, it is the oldest public sailing organization in the United States. It is also the largest; to date, they have had over half a million sailors use their organization.

== History ==
Community Boating, Inc. was founded by Joseph Lee Jr., a wealthy Bostonian and recreation advocate. In 1932, the city of Boston set $200,000 aside to build a boathouse at the West End, Boston Beach. However, by 1937 the boathouse still had not been built and so Lee partnered with William F. Brophy, a lawyer who worked in the West End, to push for the boathouse's construction to advance opportunities for public boating for local children. Lee also began regular meetings of the "Community Boat Club" in the basement of the West End Community Center to build simple plywood sailboats and the group of 100 began sailing out of the boathouse on the Charlesbank with seven boats. The Community Boat Club later relocated to Metropolitan District Commission (MDC) property on the Upper Basin without permission over concerns that they had been sailing too close to the Charles River Dam.

The Community Boat Club and Lee continued to advocate for a city-funded boathouse. In 1938, they regularly drew attention to their cause by sailing under the Longfellow Bridge into the Upper Basin, including once during the annual American Henley Regatta at the Union Boat Club. Metropolitan police towed them out of the basin in response. In another protest, the Community Boat Club marched from the West End to the State House, placing a boat called the Eugene C. Hultman inside the Hall of Flags. In 1939, the Community Boat Club petitioned the recently elected governor Leverett Saltonstall, to use a portion of the $1 million gifted to the city by Helen Storrow for the improvement of the Charles River Basin to build a boathouse. In the summer of 1939, Saltonstall attended the club's boat christening ceremony, one of which was named after him, and in 1940 he asked the state legislature to designate part of Helen Storrow's gift for completing the boathouse. In 1946, Community Boating, Inc. was formally incorporated by several sailors who had trained under Lee, following their return from World War II.

In 2007, they began a universal access program to allow people with disabilities to sail. This program was developed in partnership with the Department of Conservation and Recreation who provided funds to modify the boats and buy accessible launch equipment.

In 2026, CBI will celebrate its 80th anniversary by doing a sail-a-thon from 10:00 AM on June 20 to 10:00 AM on the 21st, having sailors sail a course for 24 hours to raise money for charity.

== Operations ==
Community Boating, Inc. operates out of a boathouse built in 1941. They employ staff to run operations and also rely on volunteers to teach classes. Available boats include kayaks, paddleboards, and sailboats. Operations are funded through corporate sponsors and membership fees. In 2021, the organization served roughly 4,000 individuals.

== Activities ==
Community Boating, Inc. continues to provide boating training and equipment with an emphasis on accessibility. As of 2025, roughly 250 members participate in the universal access program.
