= Arsenal Street Bridge =

Bridge in Watertown, Massachusetts

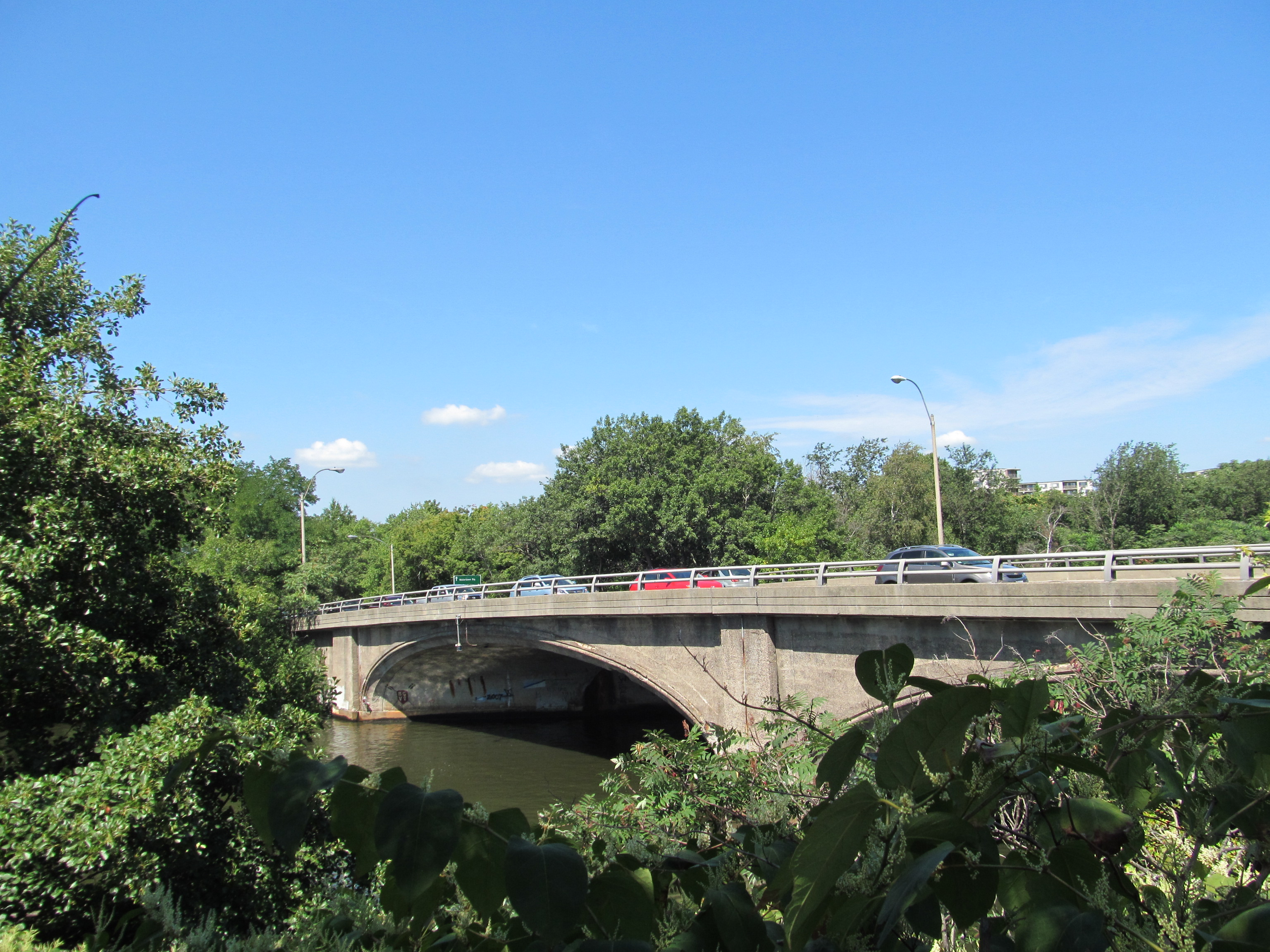
- Arsenal Street Bridge
- Coordinates: 42.361712°N 71.147221°W
- Carries: vehicular traffic
- Crosses: Charles River
- Locale: Watertown, Massachusetts to Boston, Massachusetts
- Maintained by: Massachusetts Department of Transportation

History
- Opened: 1925

The Arsenal Street Bridge is a bridge crossing the Charles River and connecting Arsenal Street in Watertown, Massachusetts to Western Avenue in Allston, Boston, Massachusetts. It was built in 1925 by the Commonwealth of Massachusetts Metropolitan District Commission.

The bridge and street are named for the nearby Watertown Arsenal. Western Avenue later crosses the Charles River again into Cambridge, Massachusetts over the Western Avenue Bridge.

== History ==
The original Arsenal Street Bridge was constructed in 1824.

== See also ==
- Arsenal Mall
- Watertown Arsenal Historic District
- Charles River Bike Path
