= Union Boat Club =

Athletic club in Boston, Massachusetts, US

Coordinates: 42.356°N 71.073°W

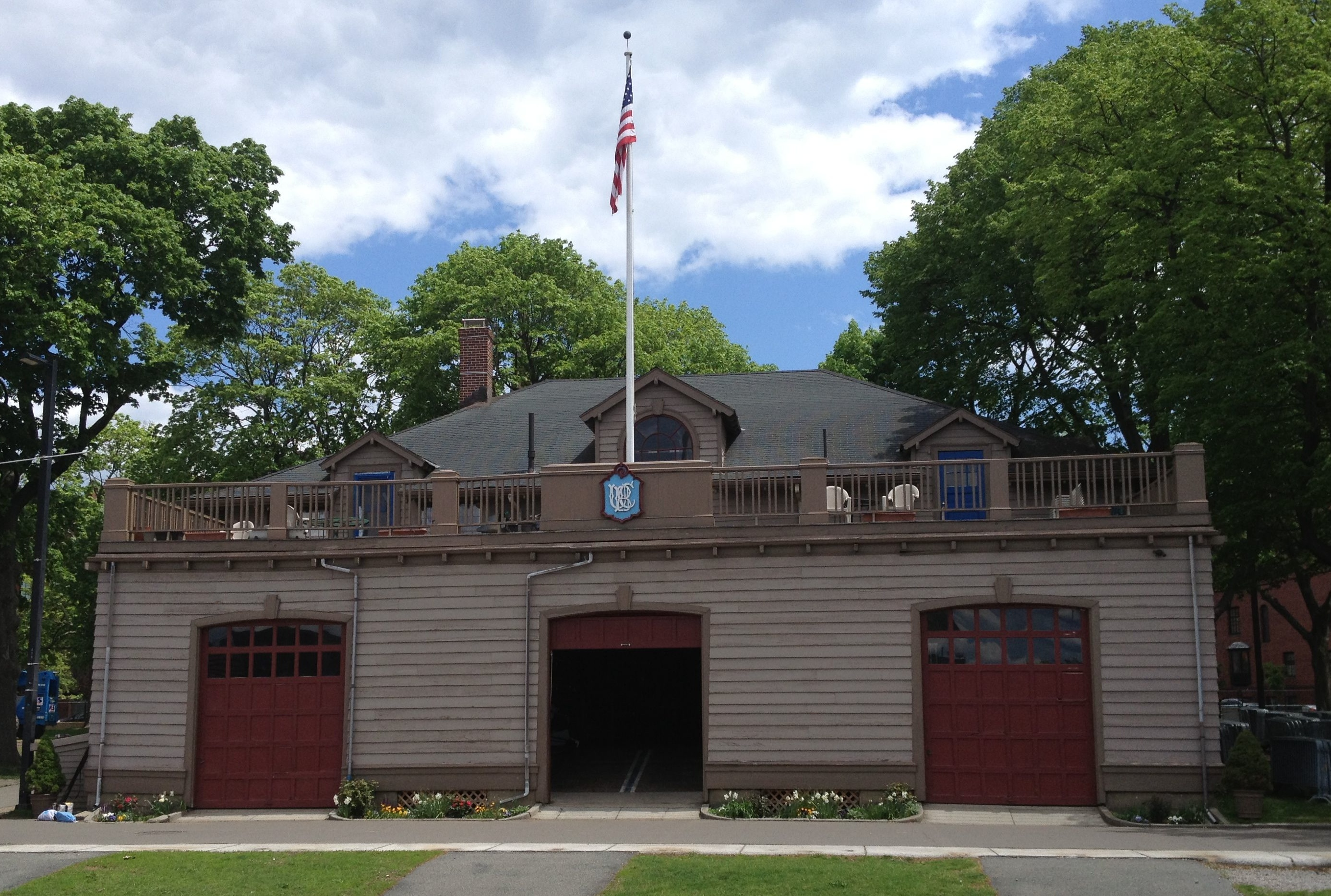
- Location: Boston
- Home water: Charles River
- Founded: 1851
- Website: www.unionboatclub.org

Notable members
- See below

The Union Boat Club (also known as UBC), founded in 1851, is an athletic club in Boston. It is the longest continuously operating rowing club in Boston. Located in the Beacon Hill neighborhood along the Charles River, the Club has grown beyond rowing and now features squash and general fitness facilities for its 700 members. In 1914, UBC placed second in the prestigious Grand Challenge Cup. The 1914 crew lost to Harvard after beating a crew from Germany to enter the finals at the Henley Royal Regatta.

Union is the sister club of University Barge Club of Philadelphia. For more than 60 years, the two sister clubs have held an annual interclub "UBC" regatta. In 2009, Michelle Guerette, an eight-time senior US National Team member and two-time Olympian, joined Union Boat Club to serve as head coach.

== Prominent members ==
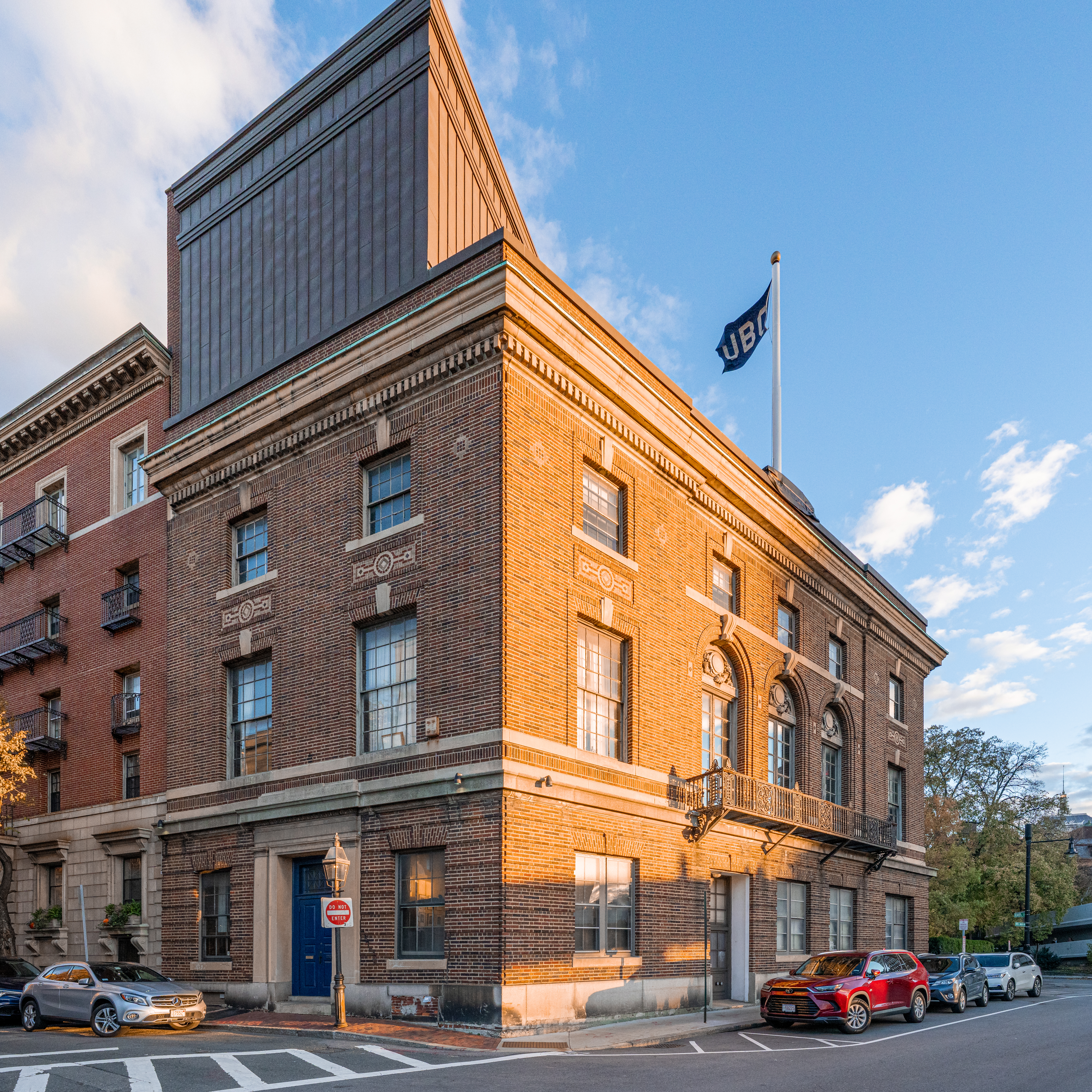
- Clubhouse at Chestnut Street (2025)
  Francis Cuddy - 2006 & 2007 US National Team member (Men's 2X 06' & Spare 07'), 2007 Pan American Team
- Catherine Humblet - 2000 & 2001 US National Team, 2003 Pan American Team
- Greg Ruckman - 2000 & 2004 US Olympic Teams
- Pete Raymond - 1972 & 1968 US Olympic Teams
- Lawrence Terry - 1972 & 1968 US Olympic Teams

== See also ==
- List of American gentlemen's clubs
- List of Charles River boathouses
