= Arsenal Yards =

Coordinates: 42.36178°N 71.15699°W

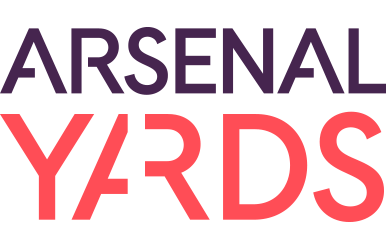
- Address: 485 Arsenal Street, Watertown, Massachusetts
- Opened: First stores opened in 2019
- Owner: Boylston Properties, Wilder Companies
- Floor area: 250,000 sq ft (23,000 m^{2})
- Parking: Surface, garage
- Public transit: MBTA: Route 70
- Website: arsenalyards.com

Arsenal Mall / Arsenal Project
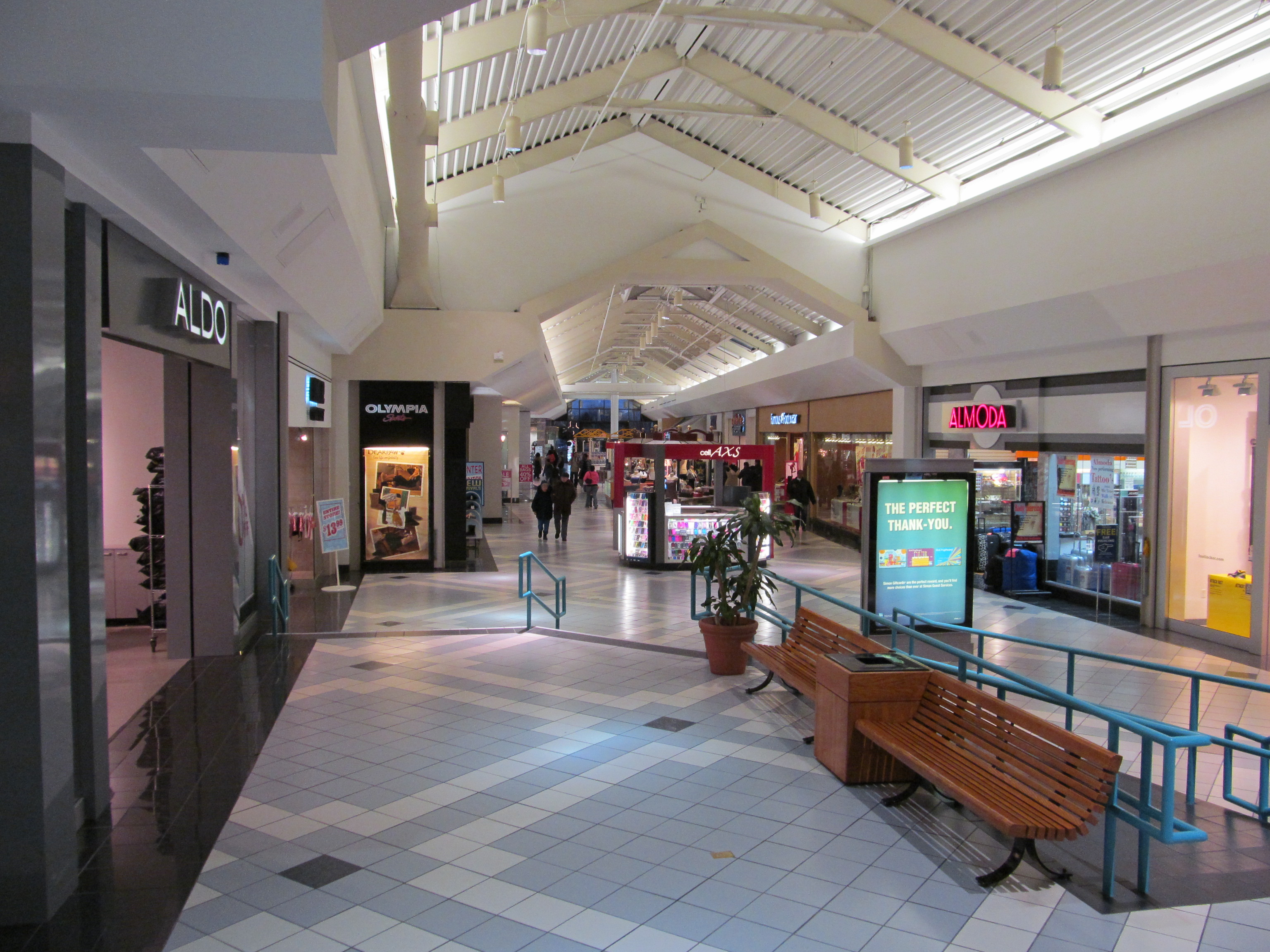
- Arsenal Mall interior, 2012
- Address: 485 Arsenal Street, Watertown, Massachusetts
- Opened: 1983; 43 years ago
- Closed: January 18, 2018; 8 years ago
- Owner: Wilder Companies, Boylston Properties
- Num. of stores: 56
- Num. of anchor tenants: 4
- Floor area: 311,000 sq ft (28,900 m^{2})
- Floors: 2
- Website: none (defunct)

Arsenal Yards (formerly known as Arsenal Mall from 1983 to 2013 and the Arsenal Project from 2013 to 2016) is a mixed-use, smart growth development in Watertown, Massachusetts. The area is home to the original Arsenal Mall site, which was redeveloped for Arsenal Yards. It includes 250,000 sq ft (23,000 m^{2}) of retail and restaurants, 200,000 sq ft (19,000 m^{2}) of office space, a 150-room Hampton Inn hotel, and 425 residences.

== History ==
Located on the site of the former Watertown Arsenal, predating the Civil War, New England Development opened the mall as Arsenal Marketplace in 1983. Original anchor stores included Marshalls and Ann & Hope. Ann & Hope closed in the early 2000s, and was replaced by Home Depot and (since closed) Linens 'n Things (replaced by Golfsmith). Simon Property Group purchased the center in 1999.

The mall featured the only digital game clock (made by the Day Sign Company of Toronto, Canada) ever used at the Boston Garden (from 1969–70 until closure) in its food court.

The mall was then purchased by developers Boylston Properties and The Wilder Companies in 2013 and renamed The Arsenal Project. In 2016, plans were introduced by Boylston Properties to redevelop the property into Arsenal Yards, a mixed-use neighborhood for residents and visitors. In January 2017, the Watertown Planning Board unanimously approved the plans. Two stores remained open throughout the duration of construction – Marshalls and the Home Depot. The first stores opened in late 2019, with Old Navy, Gap Outlet, and Chipotle, which were the last stores to be closed prior to renovation of the mall, being reopened. Shake Shack, Cinemaworld Majestic Cinema, and Ulta Beauty, among other stores, were opened afterward. A Hampton Inn hotel, Roche Bros., and other stores and restaurants were opened in 2021.

A residential community within Arsenal Yards, Blvd & Bond, opened in June 2021. It is managed by the Bozzuto Group and was developed by Boylston Properties.

== Gallery ==
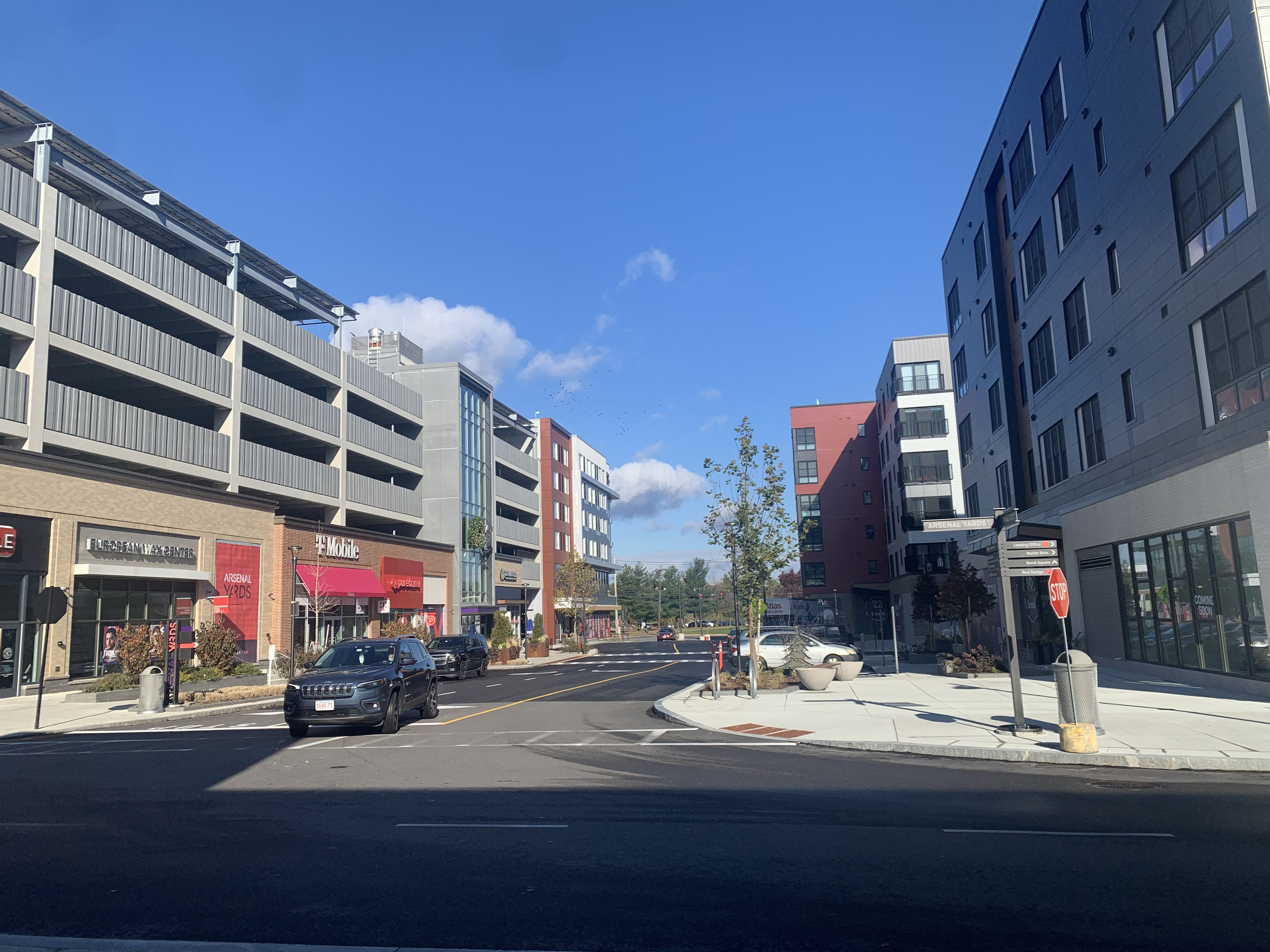

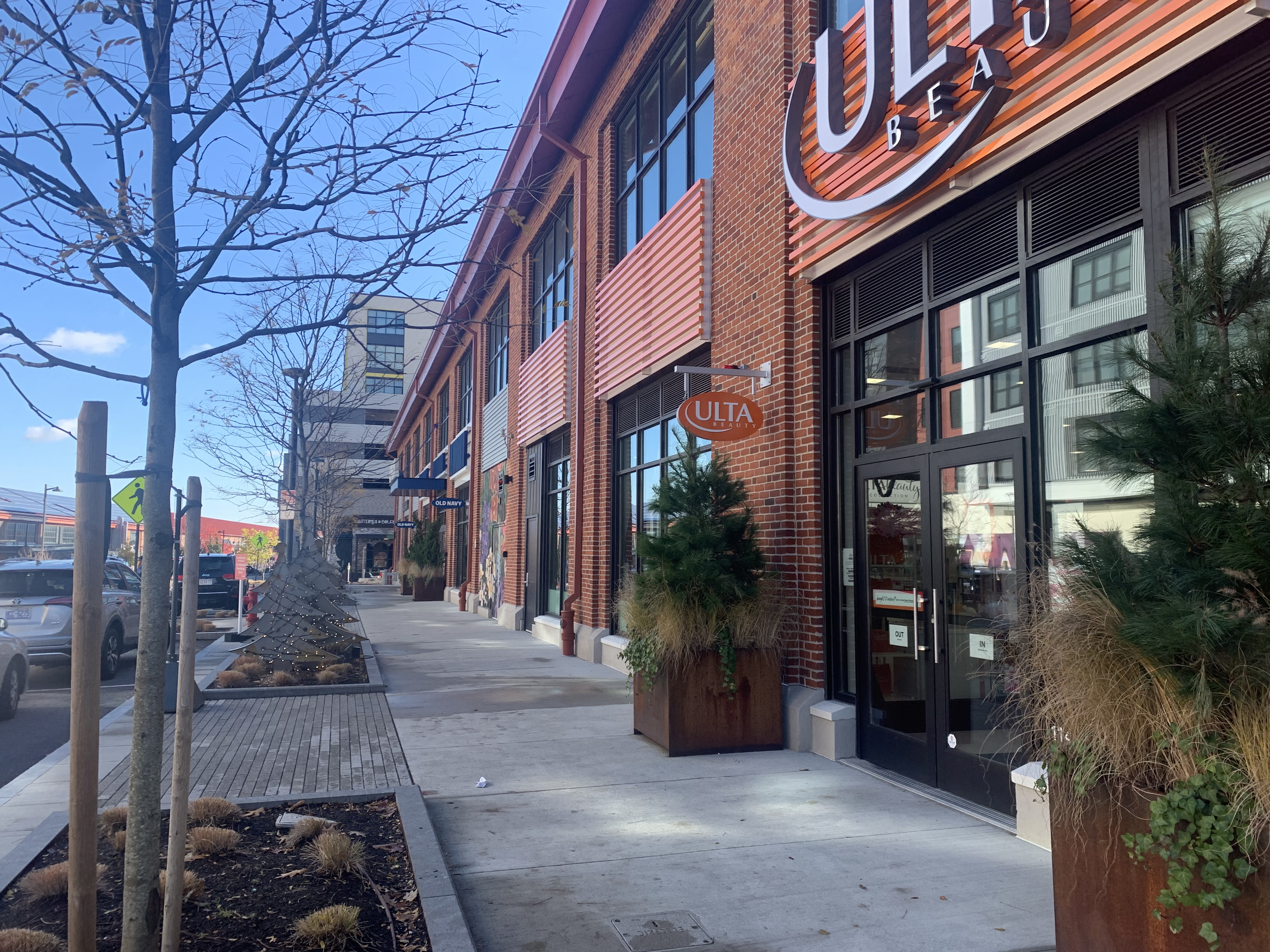
