= Renata von Tscharner =

American urban planner

Renata von Tscharner was the founder and president of the Charles River Conservancy, which has worked on the stewardship and renewal of the Charles River Parklands since 2000.

This public interest organization aims at making the 400 acres (160 ha) of urban parklands from the Boston Harbor to the Watertown Dam more attractive, active and accessible for all. The Charles River Conservancy built a 40,000 sq ft skatepark that opened in 2015. She hosts a regular TV shows on CCTV (Cambridge). Under her leadership the Conservancy began plans for a SwimPark, a pool in the Charles River.

von Tscharner has co-written several books on public art, urban design and environmental education and has taught at several academic institutions in New England. Prior to starting the Charles River Conservancy, she taught in the landscape program of Harvard's Radcliffe Seminars, she was a principal of The Townscape Institute, Assistant City Planner in Bern, Switzerland, and Planning Officer with the Greater London Council’s Covent Garden Task Force. She has a degree in architecture and city planning from the Institute of Technology in Zurich, Switzerland.

She resides in Cambridge, Massachusetts with her husband Peter Munkenbeck.

== Awards ==
- 2018: Doctorate Honoris Causa honorary degree from Boston Architectural College
- 2015: Stratton Award by Friends of Switzerland
- 2013: The Olmsted Medal by American Society of Landscape Architects
- 2011: Zone Conservation Award, the Garden Club of America
- 2008: Upstander Award by Facing History and Ourselves
- 2005: Medal of Merit by the Garden Club of America
- 2003: Excellence Award by the Boston Society of Architects

== Publications ==
- "RiverStories" Volume 3, 2015, published by the Charles River Conservancy, contributor
- "RiverStories" Volume 2, 2010, published by the Charles River Conservancy, contributor
- "Safe Crossings" op-ed, Boston Globe, April 5, 2010
- RiverStories, Volume 1, 2007 published by the Charles River Conservancy, contributor
- Keeping Parkland Promises op-ed, The Boston Globe, Feb. 10, 2003
- Foreword for Inventing the Charles River, MIT Press and the Charles River Conservancy, Dec. 2002
- Saving Parkways and a Legacy co-author of op-ed, The Boston Globe, April 30, 2001
- Making Cities Memorable World Monitor Magazine, Feb 1989
- New Providence: A Changing Cityscape- executive producer of book and poster series with seven tableaux illustrating the evolution of American city from 1875 to 1987 plus curriculum guide (San Diego, Harcourt, Brace, Jovanovich, 1987)
- Place Makers: Public Art That Tells You Where You Are co-author (First edition, New York: Hasting House, Oct. 1981. 128 Pages, 150 Photographs) (Second expanded and completely revised edition, Boston: Harcourt, Brace, Jovanovich, 1987)
