= North Beacon Street Bridge =

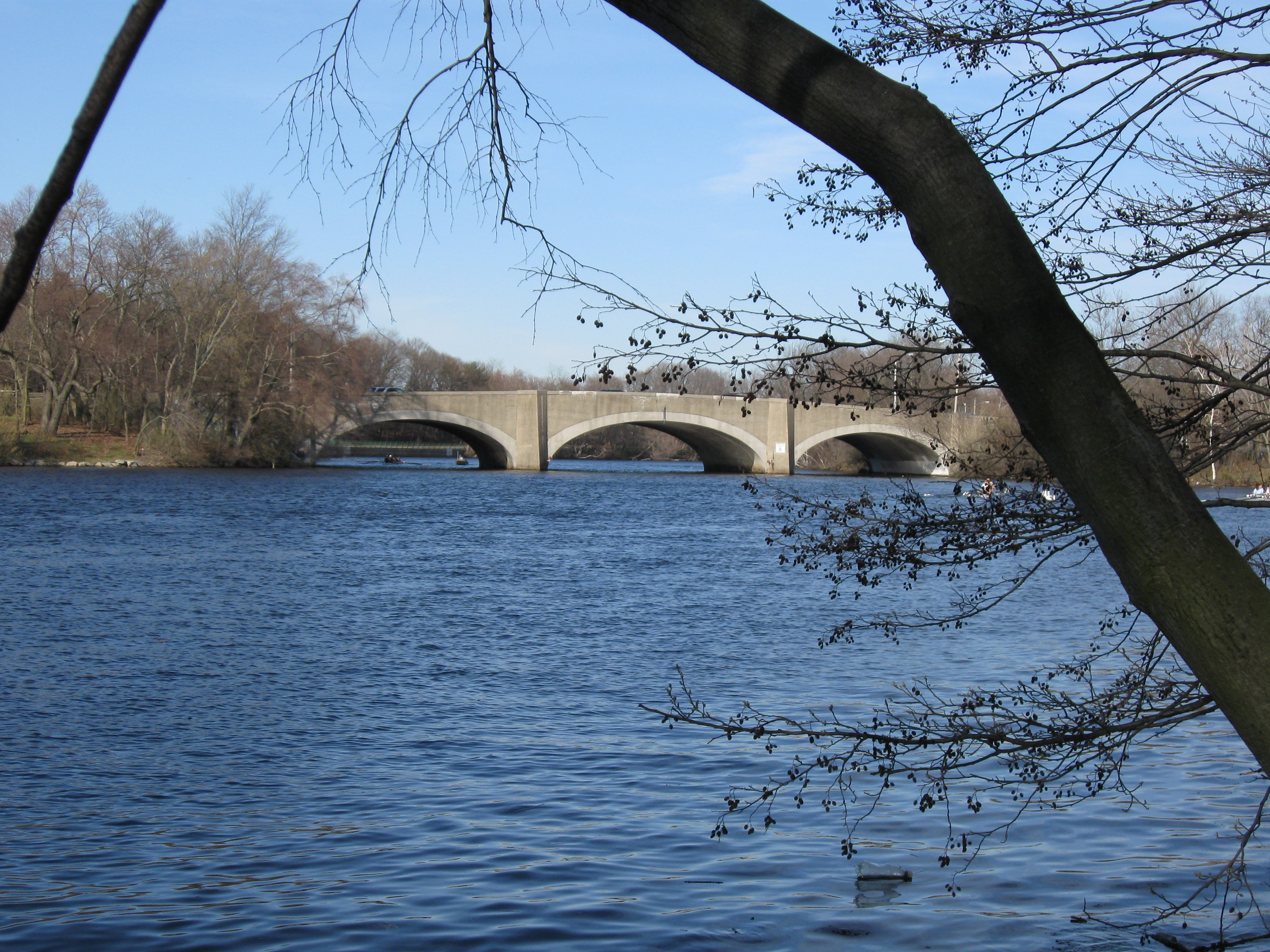
- The North Beacon Street Bridge in April 2009
- Coordinates: 42.358974°N 71.16155°W
- Carries: US 20
- Crosses: Charles River
- Locale: Watertown, Massachusetts to Boston, Massachusetts
- Maintained by: Massachusetts Department of Transportation

History
- Designer: John R. Rablin (engineer); Haven & Hoyt (architects)
- Opened: 1917

The North Beacon Street Bridge is a bridge carrying North Beacon Street (U.S. Route 20) over the Charles River between Watertown, MA and Brighton, Boston, MA. It was built in 1917.

The southern end of the bridge is also at the western terminus Birmingham Parkway (and the extension of Soldiers Field Road, not built until 1935, itself an extension of Storrow Drive), while its northern end is at the western terminus of Greenough Boulevard, an extension of Memorial Drive.

The North Beacon Street carried by this bridge is not the same street as the well-known Beacon Street in Boston.

== See also ==
- List of crossings of the Charles River
