= Eliot Bridge =

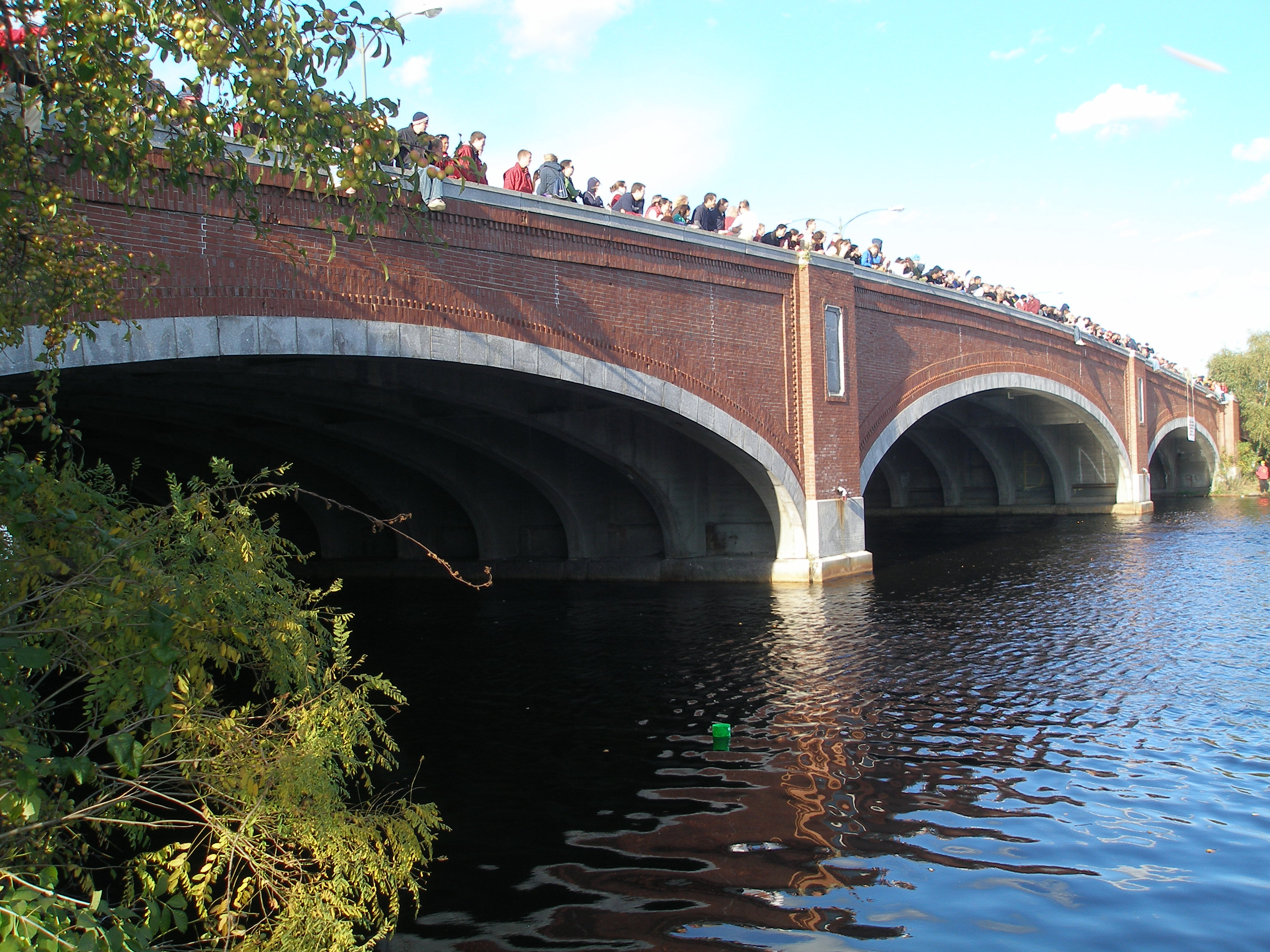
- The Eliot Bridge in October 2008
- Coordinates: 42.3718°N 71.1328°W
- Crosses: Charles River
- Locale: Cambridge, Massachusetts to Allston

Characteristics
- Design: arch bridge

History
- Construction end: 1950

Location
- Interactive map of Eliot Bridge

The Eliot Bridge is a bridge over the Charles River between Cambridge, Massachusetts and Allston, Boston, Massachusetts. It connects Soldiers Field Road in Allston with Gerry's Landing Road, Memorial Drive, Greenough Boulevard, and the Fresh Pond Parkway in Cambridge.

The bridge was built in 1950 as a memorial to Charles W. Eliot, Harvard president 1869–1909, and his son Charles Eliot, landscape architect for the Metropolitan Park Commission.

== See also ==
- List of crossings of the Charles River
