= John W. Weeks Bridge =

Charles River overpass

John W. Weeks Memorial Bridge
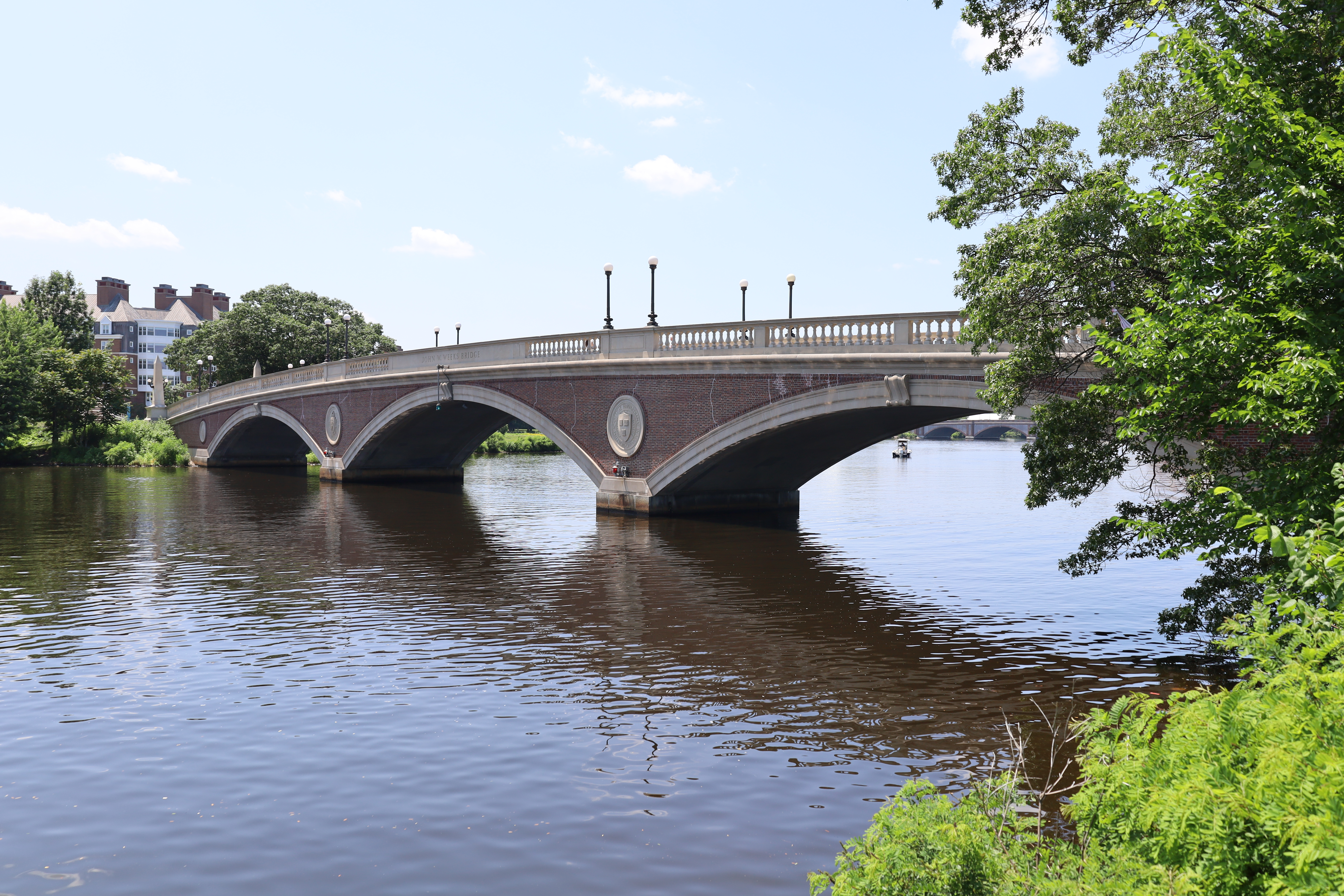
- The Weeks Bridge in 2023
- Coordinates: 42.36853°N 71.11807°W
- Carries: Pedestrians
- Crosses: Charles River
- Locale: Boston, Massachusetts to Cambridge, Massachusetts

Characteristics
- Design: arch bridge
- Material: Brick facing with limestone trim on reinforced concrete sub-structure.

History
- Designer: McKim, Mead & White, Architects. Andrew Canzanelli, Structural Engineer.
- Opened: June 1927

Location
- Interactive map of John W. Weeks Memorial Bridge

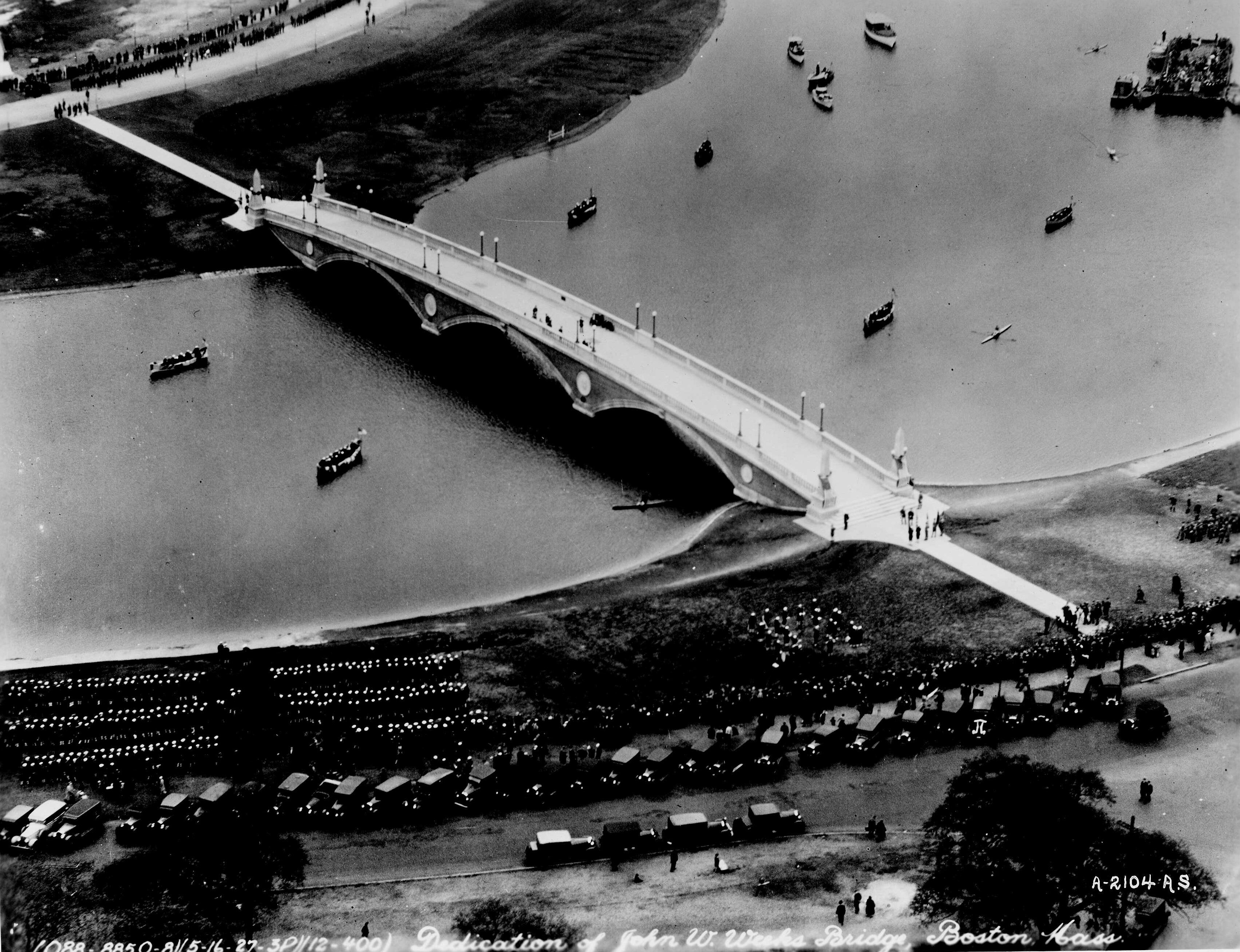
The bridge's dedication ceremony in June 1927

The John W. Weeks Memorial Bridge, usually called the Weeks Footbridge or simply Weeks Bridge, is a pedestrian bridge over the Charles River, located four miles northwest of downtown Boston on the Harvard University campus. The bridge connects Harvard’s original Cambridge campus with the Harvard Business School and many of the school’s athletic facilities in Allston.

The Weeks Bridge opened in 1927 to carry pedestrian traffic between the Harvard Business School's newly built Allston campus and Harvard's main campus in Cambridge. It is named for John W. Weeks, a longtime U.S. Representative and later U.S. Senator from Massachusetts, and the U.S. Secretary of War in the Harding and Coolidge administrations.

The bridge's concrete underbelly conceals branches of the University's steam, electrical, and communications networks.

The bridge is a popular vantage point from which to enjoy the Head of the Charles Regatta. An abrupt bend in the river prompts most boats to crowd through the bridge's center span, and collisions have occurred when coxswains could not make themselves heard above the cheering of the crowd.

== Renovation ==
On September 21, 2015, the Massachusetts Department of Conservation and Recreation held a ribbon cutting to mark completion of a $3 million renovation that made the Weeks bridge handicap accessible in compliance with the Americans with Disabilities Act. Stairs at either end were replaced with ramps and accessibility-compliant railings were installed on the bridge. Other improvements included new accessible approach paths, new lighting using replicated historic fixtures, restoring the eroded river bank adjacent to the bridge, and repairs to the bridge masonry and structure. Harvard University contributed $150,000 to the project.
