= Charles River =

River in Massachusetts, United States

Charles River Quinobequin
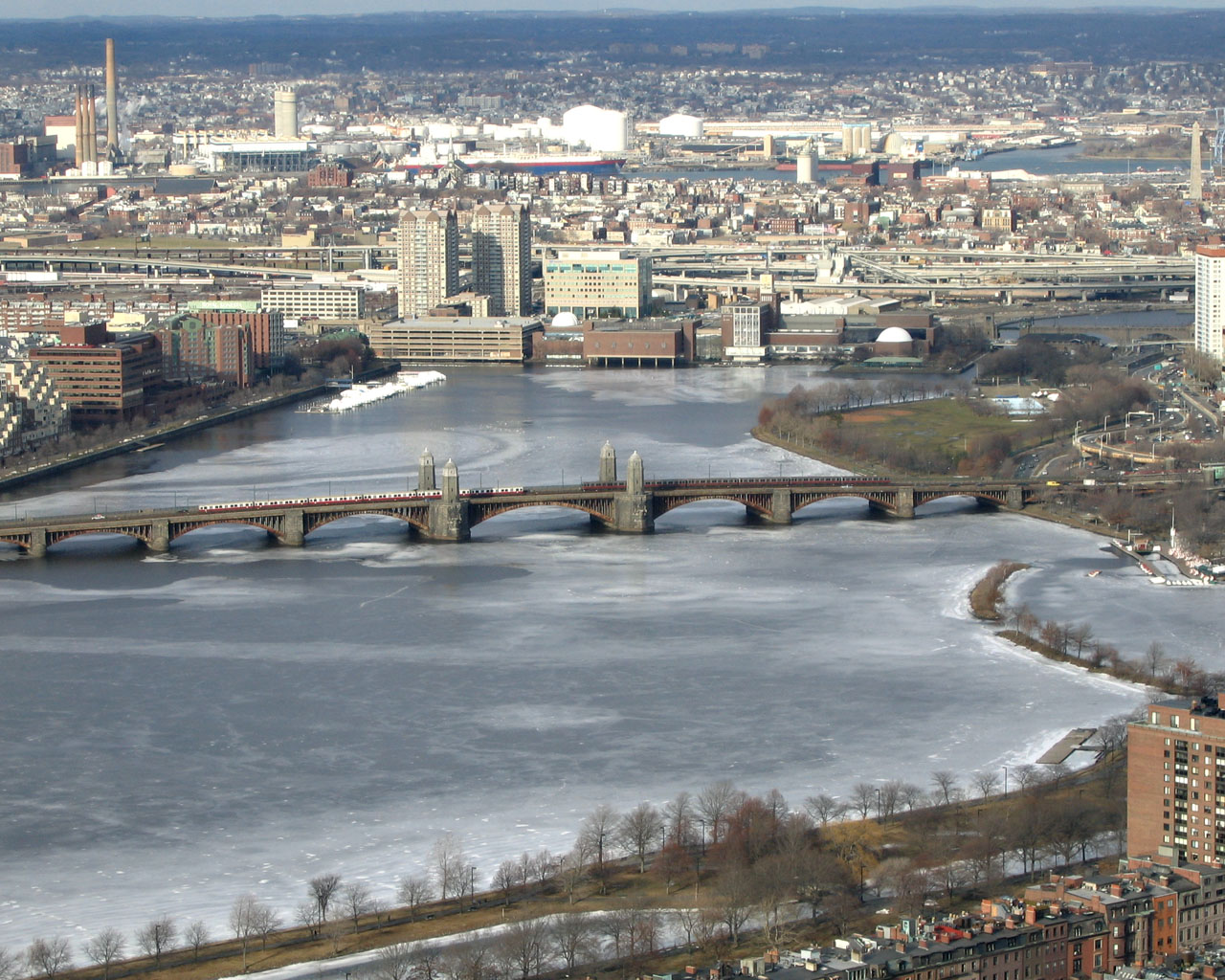
- Longfellow Bridge (center) connecting Boston and Cambridge crossing a frozen Charles River

Location
- Country: United States
- State: Massachusetts
- Cities: Hopkinton, Cambridge, Boston

Physical characteristics
- Source: Echo Lake
  - location: Hopkinton, Massachusetts, United States
  - coordinates: 42°11′34″N 71°30′43″W
  - elevation: 350 ft (110 m)
- Mouth: Boston Harbor
  - location: Boston, Massachusetts, United States
  - coordinates: 42°22′14″N 71°3′13″W
  - elevation: 0 ft (0 m)
- Length: 80 mi (130 km)
- Basin size: 308 mi^{2} (800 km^{2})
- Discharge
  - average: 302 cu ft/s (8.6 m^{3}/s)
  - minimum: 0.1 cu ft/s (0.0028 m^{3}/s)
  - maximum: 4,150 cu ft/s (118 m^{3}/s)

The Charles River (Massachusett: Quinobequin), sometimes abbreviated to the Charles, is an 80-mile-long (129 km) river in eastern Massachusetts. It flows northeast from Hopkinton to Boston along a meandering route which doubles back on itself several times and travels through 23 cities and towns before reaching the Atlantic Ocean.

== Hydrography ==
The Charles River is fed by approximately eighty streams and several major aquifers as it flows 80 miles (129 km), starting at Teresa Road just north of Echo Lake (42.215°N 71.514444°W) in Hopkinton, passing through 23 cities and towns in eastern Massachusetts before emptying into Boston Harbor. Thirty-three lakes and ponds and 35 municipalities are entirely or partially part of the Charles River drainage basin. Despite the river's length and relatively large drainage area (308 square miles; 798 km^{2}), its source is only 26 miles (42 km) from its mouth, and the river drops only 350 feet (107 m) from source to sea. The Charles River watershed contains more than 8,000 acres (32 km^{2}) of protected wetlands, referred to as Natural Valley Storage. These areas are important in preventing downstream flooding and providing natural habitats to native species.

Brandeis University, Fisher College, Harvard University, Boston University, and the Massachusetts Institute of Technology are located along the Charles River. Near its mouth, it forms the border between downtown Boston and Cambridge and Charlestown. The river opens into a broad basin and is lined by the parks of the Charles River Reservation. On the Charles River Esplanade stands the Hatch Shell, where concerts are given in summer evenings. The basin is especially known for its Independence Day celebration. The middle section of the river between the Watertown Dam and Wellesley is partially protected by the properties of the Upper Charles River Reservation and other state parks, including the Hemlock Gorge Reservation, Cutler Park, and the Elm Bank Reservation.

A detailed depth chart of the lower basin of the Charles River, from near the Watertown Dam to the New Charles River Dam, has been created by a partnership between the MIT Sea Grant College Program and the Charles River Alliance of Boaters (CRAB). Online and hardcopy charts are available as a public service.

== Recreation ==
The river is busy, apart from the winter months, with rowing, sculling, canoeing, kayaking, paddleboarding, dragonboating, and sailing, both recreational and competitive. Most of the watercraft activity occurs from the Museum of Science to the center of Watertown, above which is a dam. These 17 miles (27 km) see motorboat traffic from two marinas and a boat ramp near Watertown, as well as two marinas downstream and boats entering from Boston Harbor through an old lock next to the Museum of Science. A canoe and kayak ADA-accessible launch at Magazine Beach in Cambridge opened 23 September 2019.

The Charles is renowned as a rowing and sculling locale, with many boathouses and the three-mile Head of the Charles Regatta, the world's largest long-distance rowing regatta. The major boathouses, starting up stream near Watertown, are Community Rowing, Inc., housing Boston College Crew; Northeastern University's Henderson Boathouse; Cambridge Boat Club; Newell, home of Harvard Men's Rowing; Weld, home of Harvard Women's Rowing; Riverside Boat Club; Boston University's DeWolfe; Massachusetts Institute of Technology's Pierce; and Union Boat Club.

The Lower Basin between the Longfellow and Harvard (Massachusetts Avenue) bridges has the sailing docks of Community Boating, the Harvard University Sailing Center, and the MIT Sailing Pavilion. Sailboat, kayak, and paddleboard rentals are available at the Boston University Sailing Pavilion. Charles River Canoe and Kayak has four locations along the Charles, renting kayaks, canoes, and paddleboards.

Duck Boats regularly enter the Charles near the Museum of Science and river tour boat excursions depart from a lagoon near the museum. In early June, the Hong Kong Boston Dragon Boat Festival is held in Cambridge, near the Weeks Footbridge.

The Charles River Bike Path runs 23 miles (37 km) along the banks of the Charles, starting at the Museum of Science and passing the campuses of MIT, Harvard and Boston University. The path is popular with runners and bikers. Many runners gauge their distance and speed by keeping track of the mileage between the bridges along the route.

After two decades of water quality improvement efforts spearheaded by the Environmental Protection Agency, on July 13, 2013, swimming for the general public was officially permitted for the first time in more than 50 years.

Fishing from the banks or small craft is common along the Charles. With catches from the Charles from Natick to Boston the public is advised not to eat carp, and for non-pregnant, non-nursing adults, to limit large mouth bass consumption to no more than twice a month. Children and pregnant or nursing women should eat nothing from the Charles River. Both cautions are due to PCB and pesticide contamination. Up river from Natick, similar advisories are in effect for all fish on account of mercury, chlordane, and DDT in the fish.

== History ==
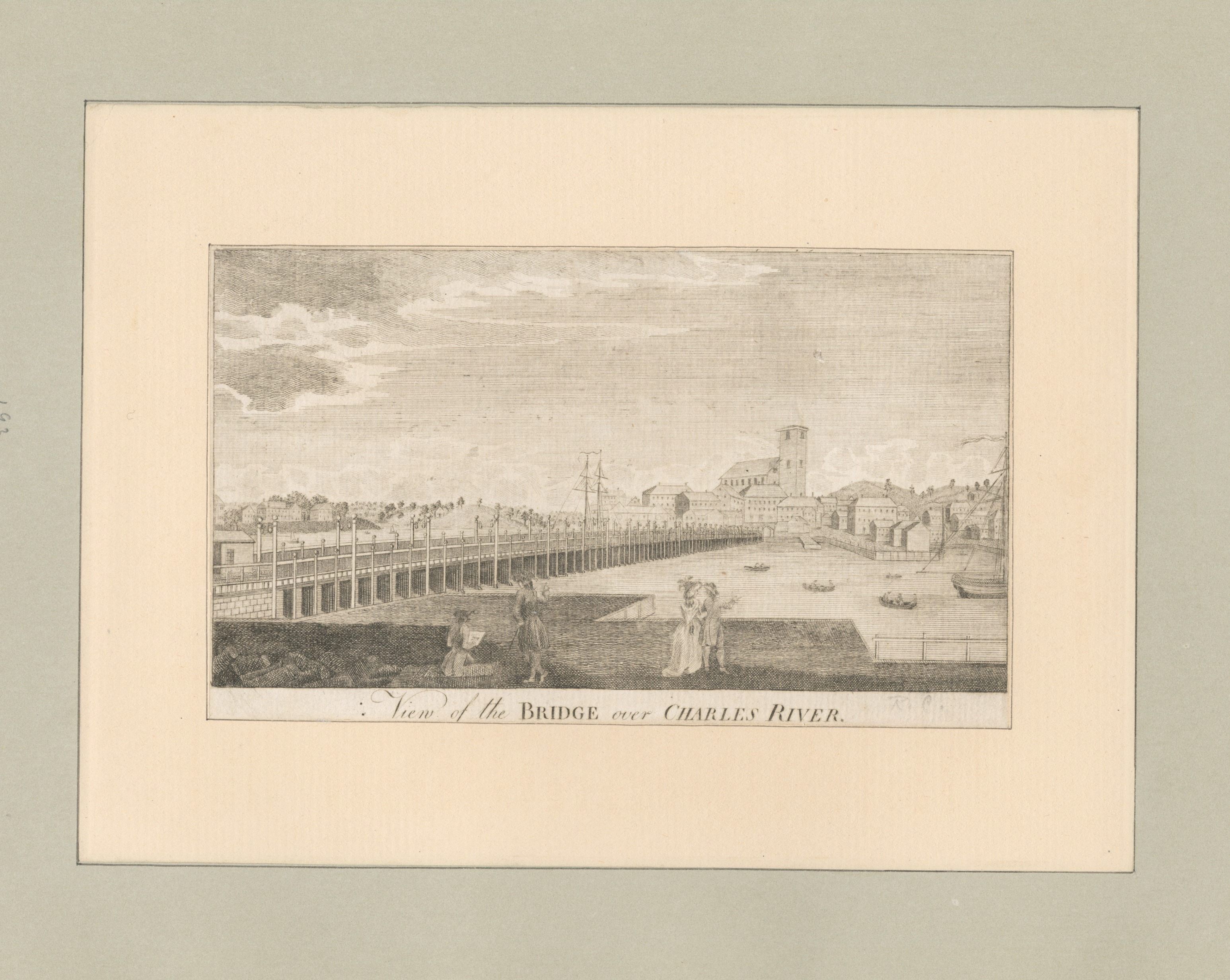
View of the bridge over Charles River, an illustration now housed in the New York Public Library

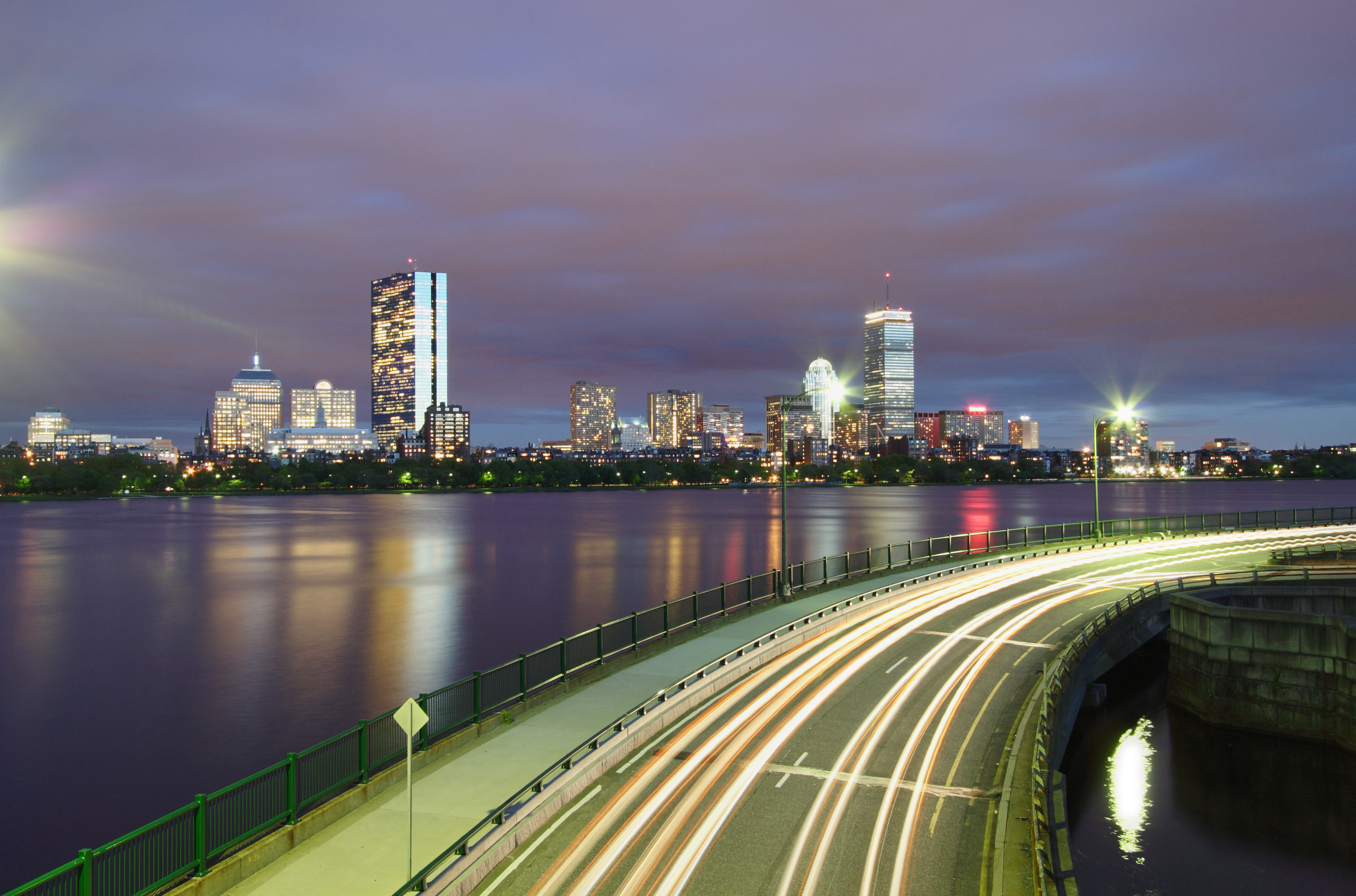
View of the Charles River and Memorial Drive in Cambridge (foreground), and the Back Bay skyline of Boston at night

=== Precolonial ===
Long before European settlers named and shaped the Charles, Native Americans living in New England made the river a central part of their lives. At the time of European colonization in the early 1600s, settlements of Massachusett people were present along the river at Nonantum in current-day Newton and Pigsgusset in current-day Watertown.

Prior to the arrival of Puritan colonists in the 1620s, Captain John Smith of Jamestown explored and mapped the coast of New England, originally naming the Charles River the Massachusetts River, which he derived from the Massachusett people living in the region, not from their actual name for the river, Quinobequin. When Smith presented his map to Prince Charles, future King Charles I, he suggested that the Prince should feel free to change any of the "barbarous names" for "English" ones. The Prince made many such changes, but only four survive today, one of which is the Charles River which Charles named for himself.

The native name for the Charles River was Quinobequin, possibly meaning "meandering" in Massachusett from quinnuppe or "it turns." Other sources state this name was transferred from the Kennebec River in Maine to Cambridge by Prince Charles at the time he renamed this river in his name. Still another explanation is that Quinobequin was a descriptive term for any long body of water for Eastern Algonquin peoples, which European explorers and settlers interpreted as a local proper name. Examples include the Kennebec River ("long water place") and Kennebunk in Maine, the Quinebaug River ("long pond"), Quinapoxet River ("at the little long pond"), and Quinnipiac River ("long pond") in present-day Massachusetts, Connecticut, and New Hampshire.

=== Industrial ===
As native populations were driven out by European settlers, the Charles River became an early center for hydropower and manufacturing in North America. Although in portions of its length, the Charles drops slowly in elevation and has relatively little current, early settlers in Dedham, Massachusetts, found a way to use the Charles to power mills. In 1639, the town dug a canal from the Charles to a nearby brook that drained to the Neponset River. By this action, a portion of the Charles's flow was diverted, providing enough current for several mills. The new canal and the brook together are now called Mother Brook. The canal is regarded as the first industrial canal in North America. It remains in use for flood control.

Waltham was the site of the first fully integrated textile factory in America, built by Francis Cabot Lowell in 1814, and by the 19th century the Charles River was one of the most industrialized areas in the United States. Its hydropower soon fueled many mills and factories. By the century's end, 20 dams had been built across the river, mostly to generate power for industry. An 1875 government report listed 43 mills along the 9 1/2-mile (15 km) tidal estuary from Watertown Dam to Boston Harbor.

From 1816 to 1968, the U.S. Army operated a gun and ammunition storage and later production facility known as the Watertown Arsenal. While it was key to many of the nation's war efforts over its several decades in operation, not the least of which being the American Civil War and World War I, its location in Watertown so near the Charles did great environmental harm. The arsenal was declared a Super Fund site, and after its closure by the government it had to be cleaned at significant expense before it could be safely used again for other purposes. Likewise, the many factories and mills along the banks of the Charles supported a buoyant economy in their time but left a legacy of massive pollution.

For several years, the Charles River Speedway operated along part of the river.

=== Creation of the modern Boston-Cambridge basin ===
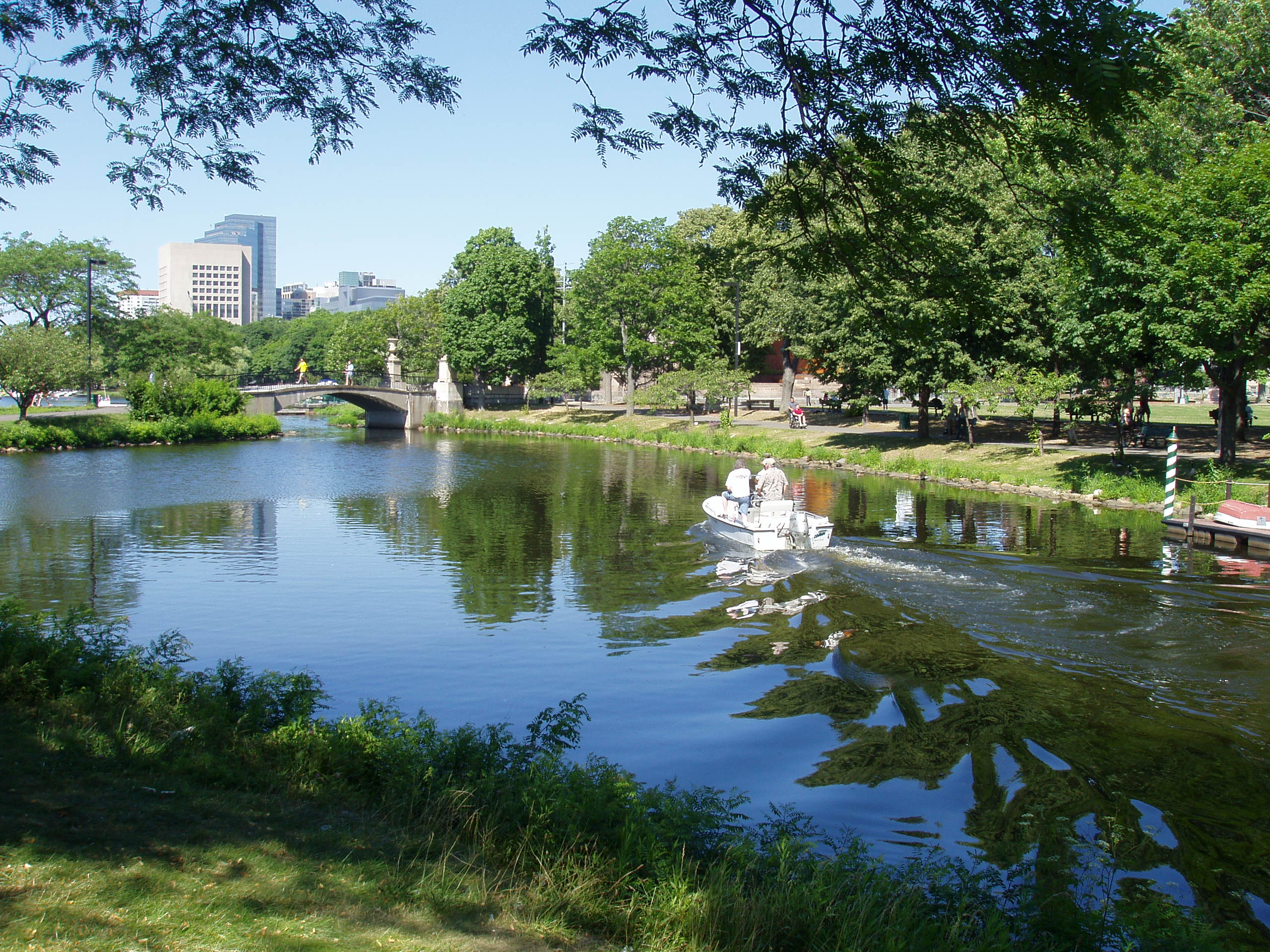
A sunny day on the Charles River Esplanade

Today's Charles River basin between Boston and Cambridge is almost entirely a work of human design. Owen A. Galvin was appointed head of the Charles River Improvement Commission by Governor William E. Russell in 1891. Their work led to the design initiatives of noted landscape architects Charles Eliot and Arthur Shurcliff, both of whom had apprenticed with Frederick Law Olmsted and Guy Lowell. This designed landscape includes over 20 parks and natural areas along 19 miles (31 km) of shoreline, from the New Dam at the Charlestown Bridge to the dam near Watertown Square.

Eliot first envisioned today's river design in the 1890s, an important model being the layout of the Alster basin in Hamburg, but major construction began only after Eliot's death with the damming of the river's mouth at today's Boston Museum of Science, an effort led by James Jackson Storrow. The new dam, completed in 1910, stabilized the water level from Boston to Watertown, eliminating the existing mud flats, and a narrow embankment was built between Leverett Circle and Charlesgate. After Storrow's death, his widow Mrs. James Jackson Storrow donated $1 million toward the creation of a more generously landscaped park along the Esplanade; it was dedicated in 1936 as the Storrow Memorial Embankment. This also enabled the construction of many public docks in the Charles River Basin. In the 1950s a highway, Storrow Drive, was built along the edge of the Esplanade to connect Charles Circle with Soldiers Field Road, and the Esplanade was enlarged on the water side of the new highway.

The Inner Belt highway was proposed to cross the Charles River at the Boston University Bridge, but its construction was canceled in the 1970s.

=== History of pollution and remediation efforts ===
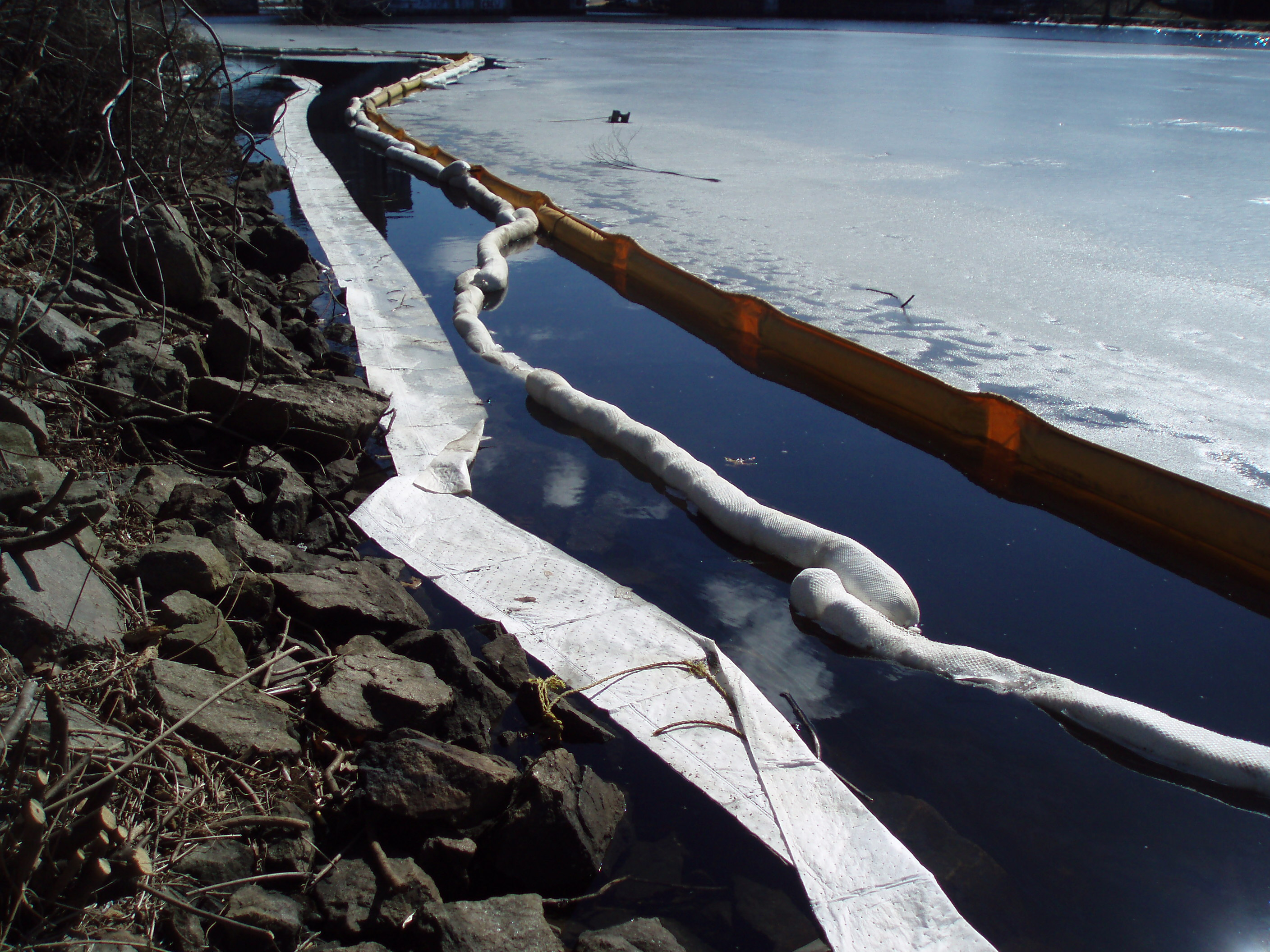
Release of heating oil to the Charles River from an MWRA pumping station in Cambridge, 2010

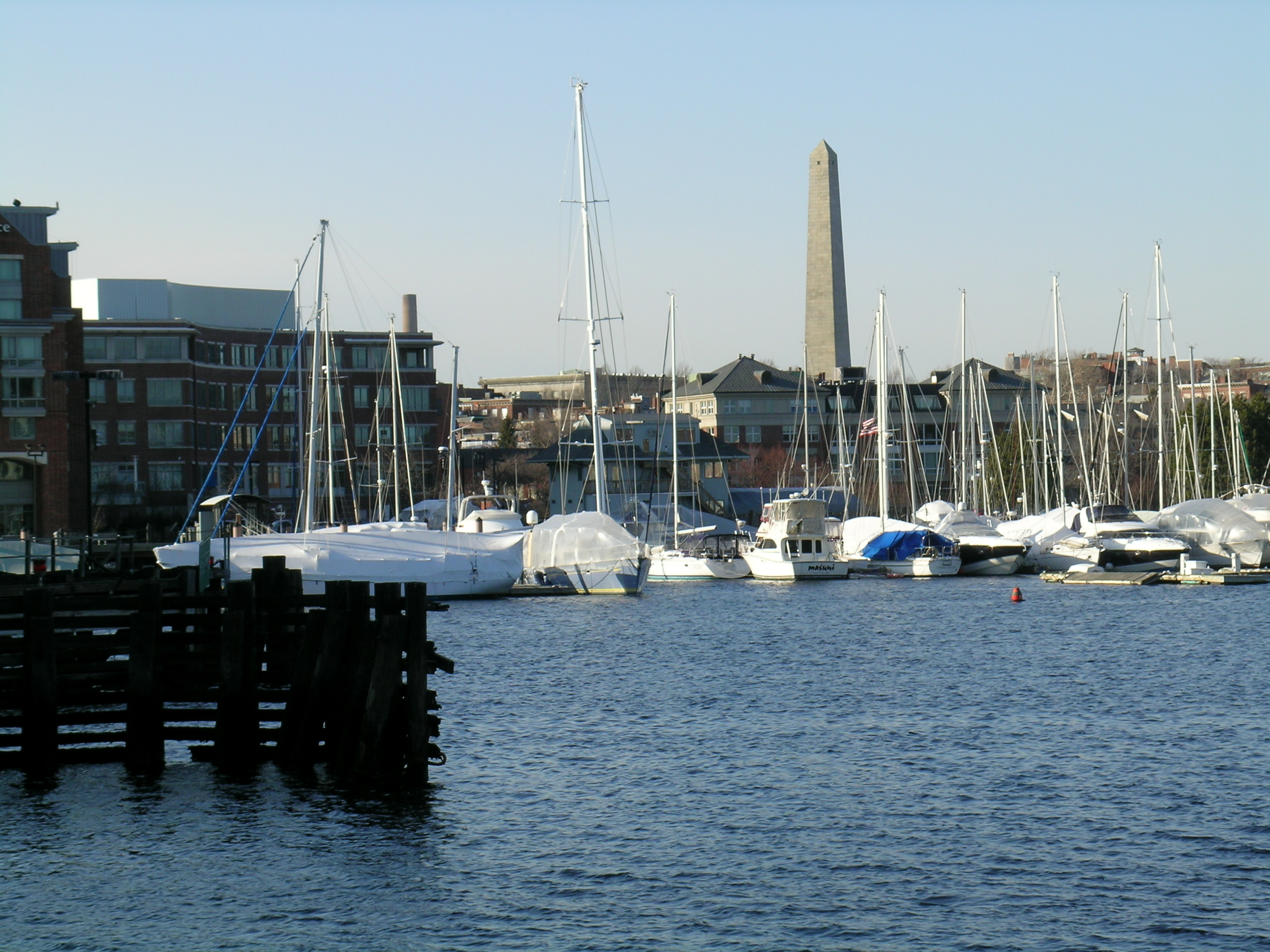
Sailboats moored on the Charlestown side of the Charles River with Bunker Hill Monument in the distance

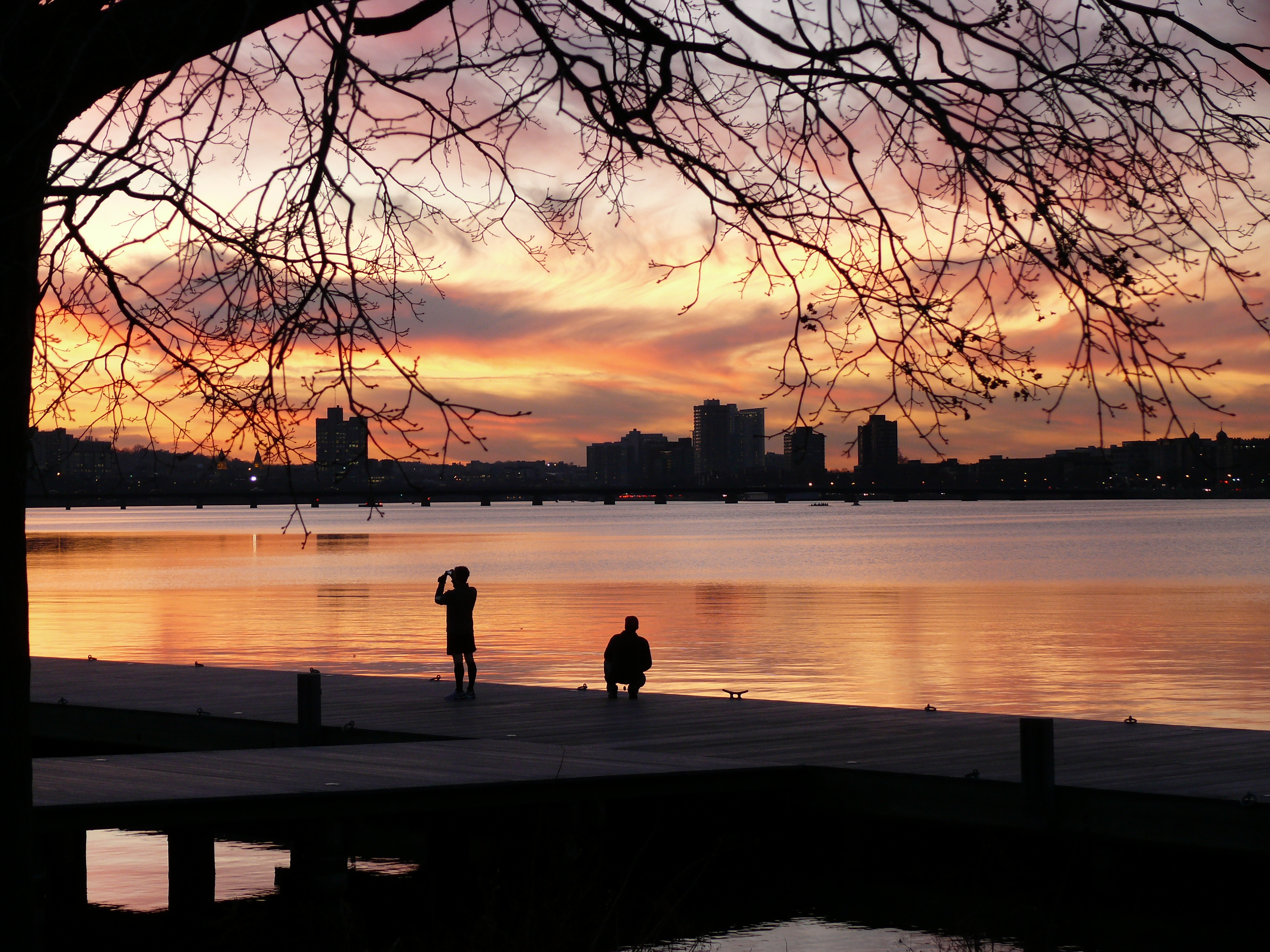
Sunset on the Charles River in December 2010

As sewage, industrial wastewater and urban runoff flowed freely into the river from the surrounding city, the Charles River became well known for its high level of pollutants, gaining such notoriety that by 1955, Bernard DeVoto wrote in Harper's Magazine that the Charles was "foul and noisome, polluted by offal and industrious wastes, scummy with oil, unlikely to be mistaken for water." Fish kills and submerged vehicles were a common sight, along with toxic chemical plumes that colored parts of the river pink and orange. The Standells sang about the sorry state of the Charles in their 1965 song "Dirty Water".

Once popular with swimmers, awareness of the river's high pollution levels forced the state to shut down several popular swimming areas, including Cambridge's Magazine Beach and Gerry Landing public beaches.

Efforts to clean up the river and restore it to a state where swimming and fishing would be acceptable began as early as the 1960s, and the program to clean up the Charles for good took shape in 1965 with the creation of the Charles River Watershed Association. In 1978, a new Charles River Dam was constructed downstream from the Science Museum site to keep salt water out of the basin.

In 1995, the United States Environmental Protection Agency declared a goal of making the river swimmable by 2005. In 1996, Governor William Weld plunged, fully clothed, into the river to prove his commitment to cleaning up the river. On November 12, 2004, Christopher Swain became the first person to swim the Charles River's entire length, in an effort to raise public awareness of the river's environmental health. In July 2007, the river hosted the Charles River Masters Swim Race, the first sanctioned race in the Charles in over five decades.

A combination of public and private initiatives helped drastically lower levels of pollutants by focusing on eliminating combined sewer overflows and stormwater runoff. Since Weld's stunt, the river's condition has improved dramatically, although it was not deemed entirely swimmable by 2005.

The Conservation Law Foundation opposes the permit given to Mirant for the Veolia Energy North America Kendall Cogeneration Station, an electricity plant near Kendall Square, charging that the water it releases causes blooms of hazardous microorganisms because of its warm temperature.

The water quality of the Charles River is often at its worst after a large rainfall because of pollutants carried by runoff, and sewage overflows. For 2011, the EPA reported that the Charles met state bacterial standards for boating and swimming 96% and 89% of the time on dry days, and 74% and 35% of the time on wet days, respectively. Overall boatability and swimability of 82% and 54% in 2011 compared with 39% and 19% in 1995. In June 2018, the Environmental Protection Agency graded the river's 2017 bacterial water quality "A−".

A study published in the Journal of the American Water Resources Association in April 2008 and completed by researchers at Northeastern University, found high concentrations of E. coli bacteria in the Charles River after a long period of no rain. Using a mathematical model, the researchers then determined that two major tributaries, the Stony Brook and Muddy River, are the predominant sources of E. coli in the lower Charles River.

Starting in 2007, the Charles River Swimming Club has organized an annual race for its members, but obtains a special permit and must monitor water quality and rainfall in the days leading up to the race. The "first public swim" in the Charles since the 1950s was conducted on July 13, 2013, by the Charles River Conservancy, (Note: The Charles River Conservancy was founded by Renata von Tscharner.) Charles River Watershed Association (CRWA), Esplanade Association, and DCR. Both the annual race and the Conservancy event have been held in deep water with swimmers jumping in off a dock, to avoid the toxic sediments on the bottom of the river that still make beach swimming dangerous. Swimming without a permit is punishable by a fine up to $250.

== Wildlife ==
=== Fish ===
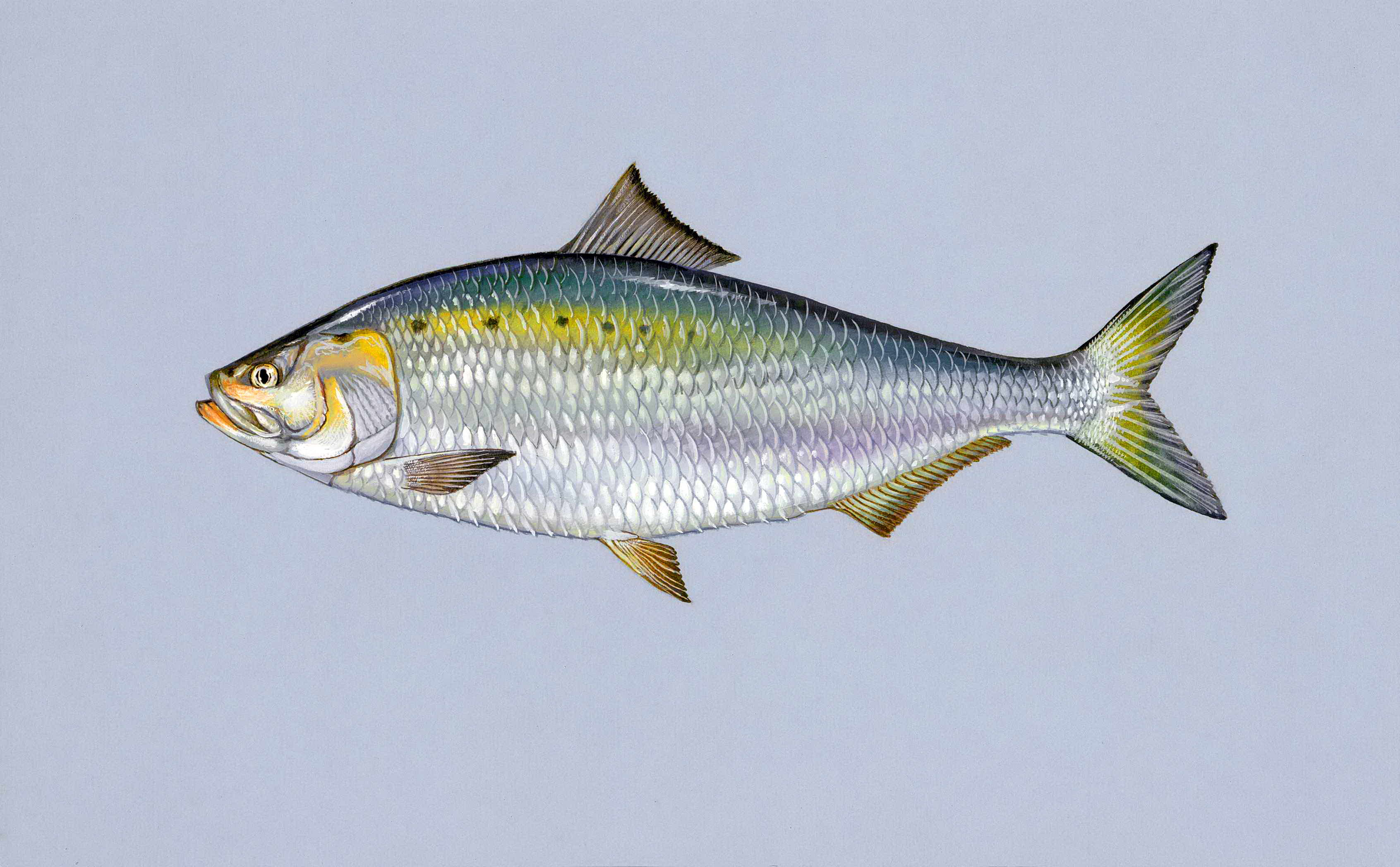
American Shad (Alosa sapidissima)

The Charles River is home to a wide range of freshwater fish species and some diadromous species. There are over 25 species able to be found in the Charles and some of the most common freshwater fish include the Redfin Pickerel, Largemouth Bass, Golden Shiner, Yellow Perch, a variety of sunfish (such as Bluegills, Redbreast Sunfish, and Pumpkinseeds), and some species of catfish (Yellow Bullhead, Brown Bullhead, White Bullhead). The diadromous fish (fish that spend parts of their lives in fresh and salt water) that can be found in the Charles are mostly anadromous species (fish that migrate from sea to freshwater to spawn). These include the Alewife Herring, American Shad, White Perch, and Striped Bass. The only catadromous species (fish that migrate from freshwater to sea to spawn) in the Charles is the American Eel.

With the many initiatives to improve the health of the river in the years since the formation of the CRWA, the health and variety of fish in the river have greatly improved. One example of this is the reintroduction of American Shad into the Charles. American Shad used to be one of the most common species in the river until the 1800s when population numbers decreased because of new dams and poor water quality. With improved water quality and partial dam breaches created in modern times, the CRWA, along with the Massachusetts Division of Marine Fisheries and the U.S. Fish and Wildlife Service, targeted American Shad as a species to revive in the river's ecosystem. In the years from 2006 to 2011, the river was stocked with millions of shad fry. Research showed that these shad were in fact returning to the river to spawn, a testament to the improved health of the river.

== Gallery ==
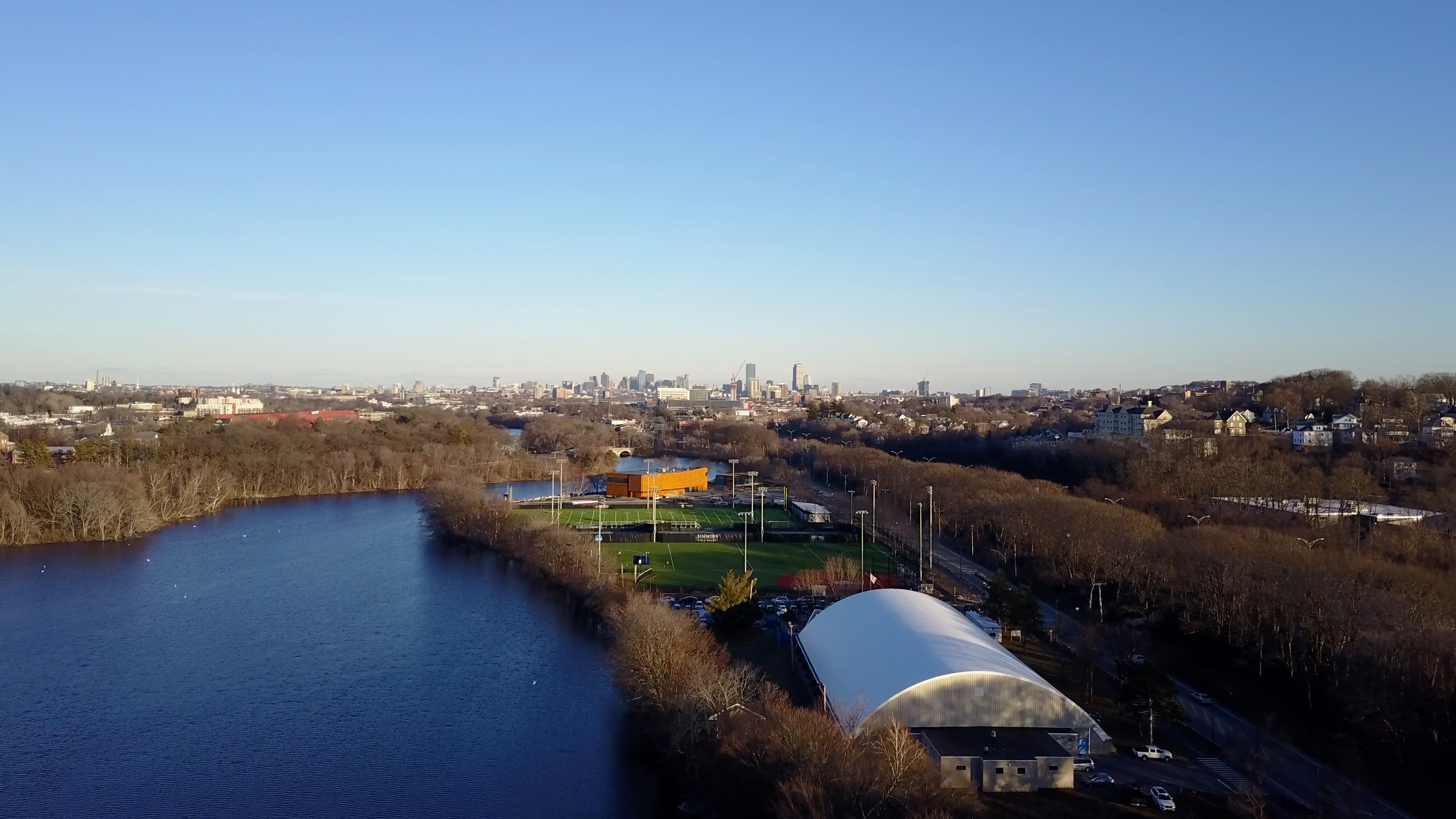
View of the Charles River, Community Rowing, Inc. and Boston from Nonantum

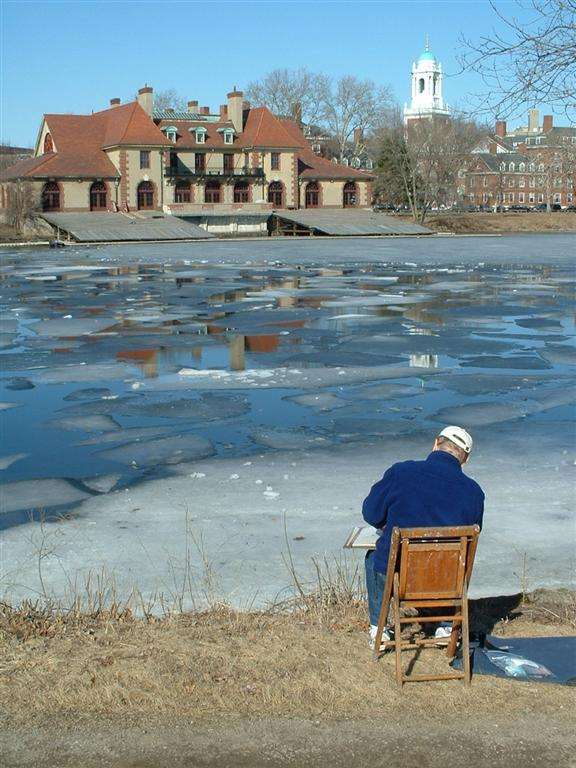
The Charles River from the Boston side, facing Weld Boathouse and the main campus of Harvard University in Cambridge

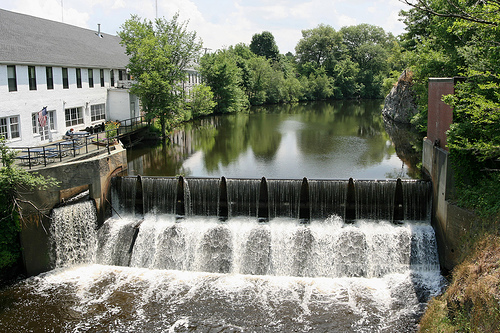
View of Charles River at Newton Upper Falls

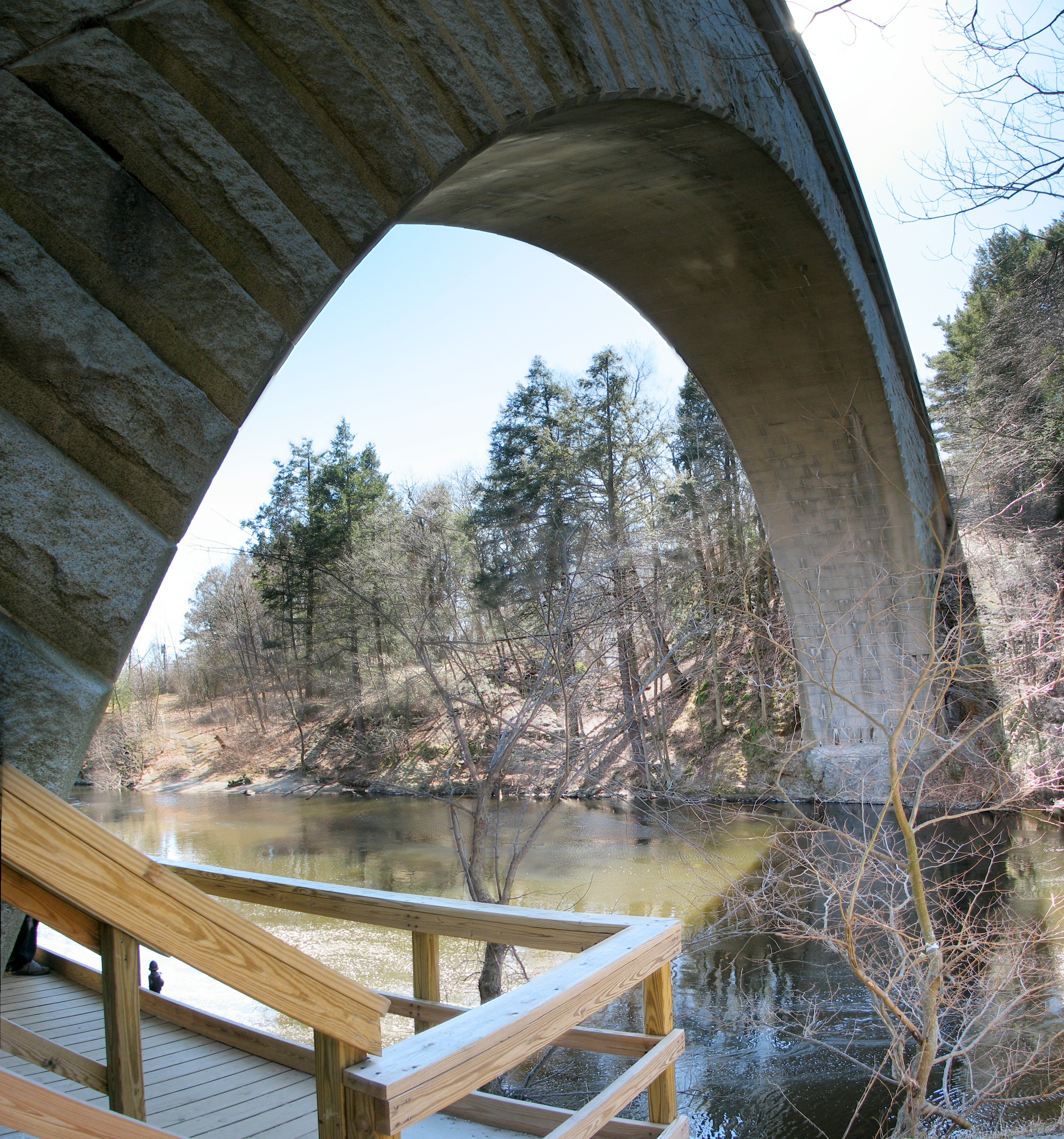
Charles River under Echo Bridge in Newton

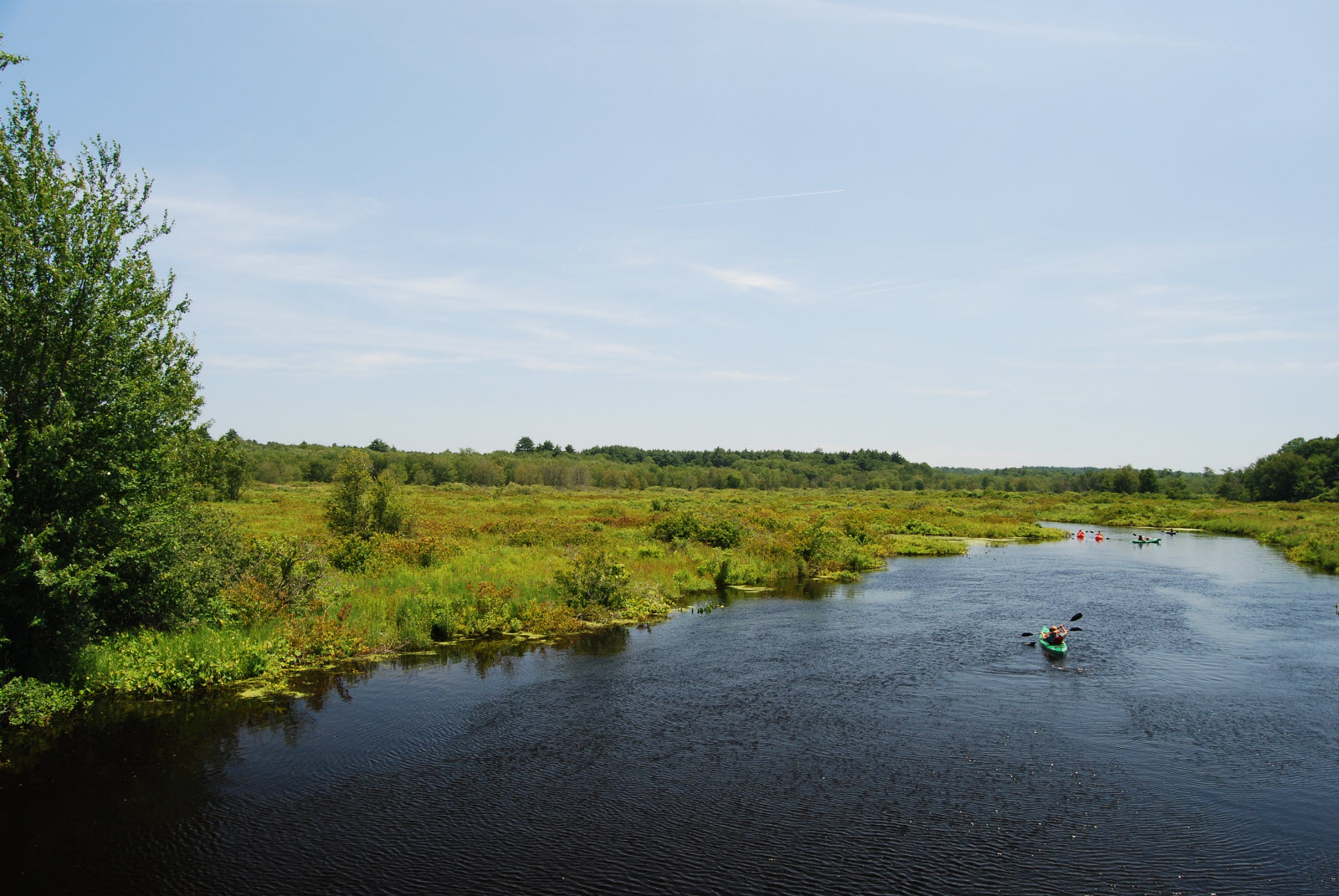
Charles River at Medfield-Millis town line

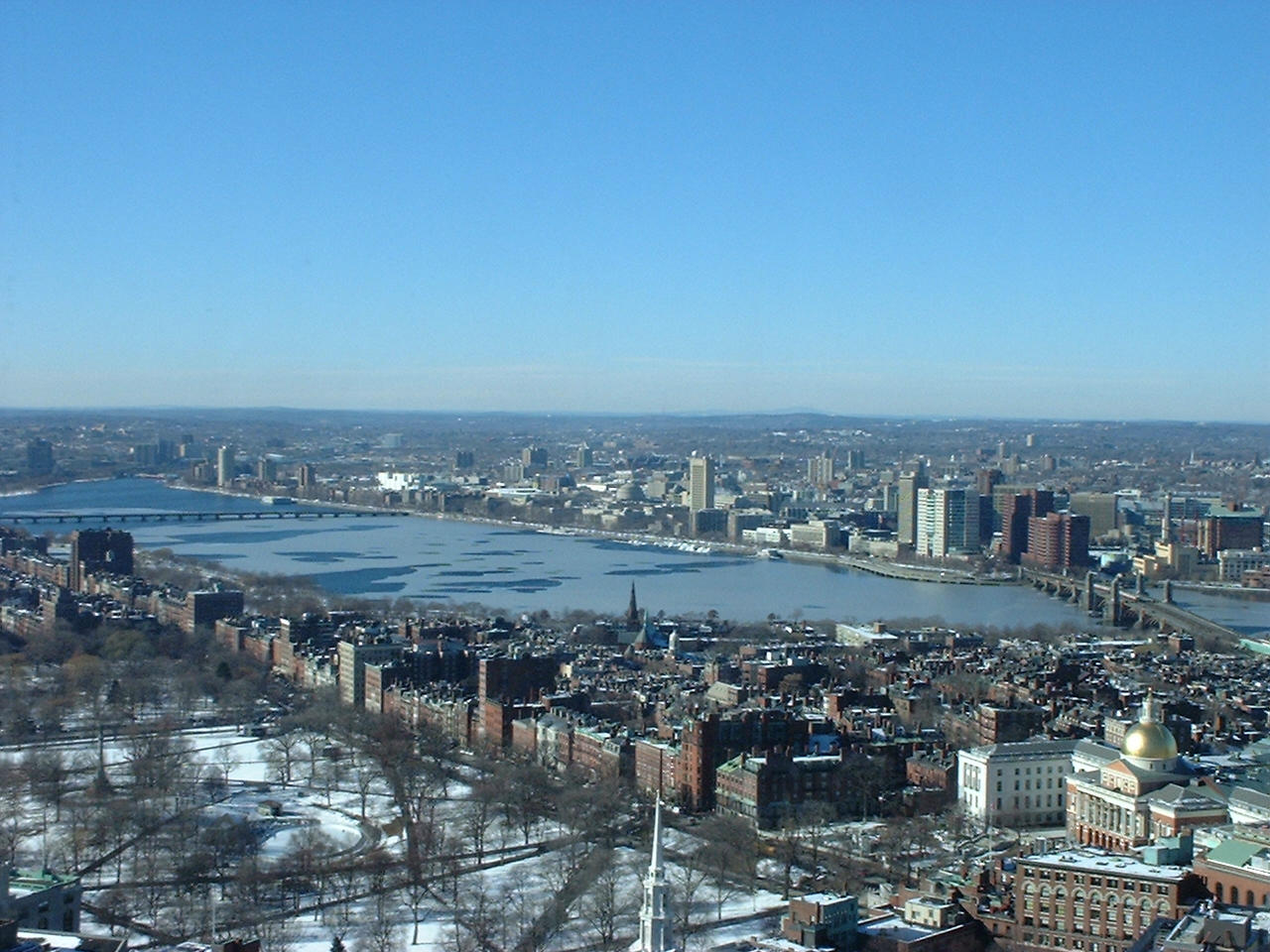
Charles River basin from an office tower in Boston

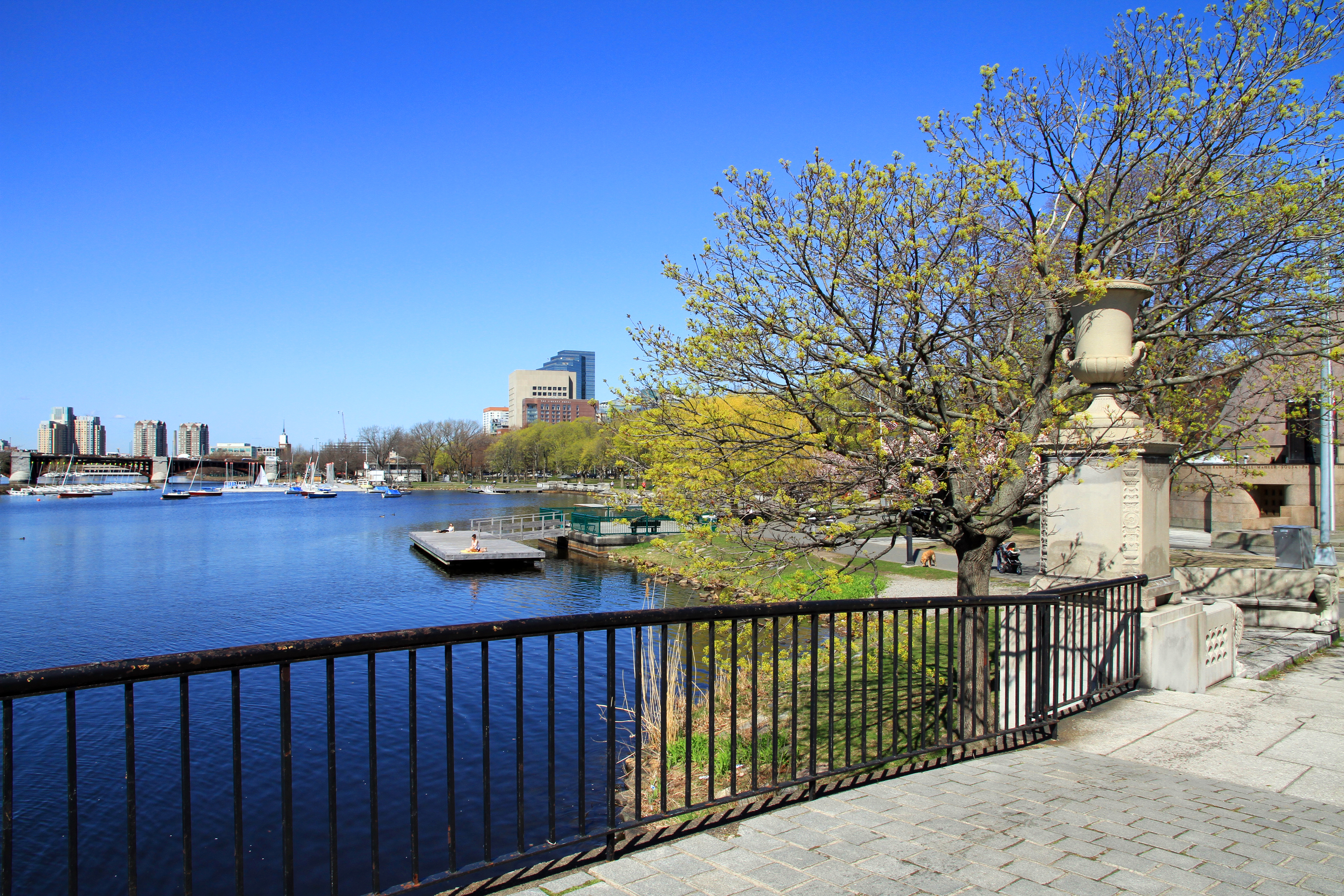
Charles River Esplanade in 2013

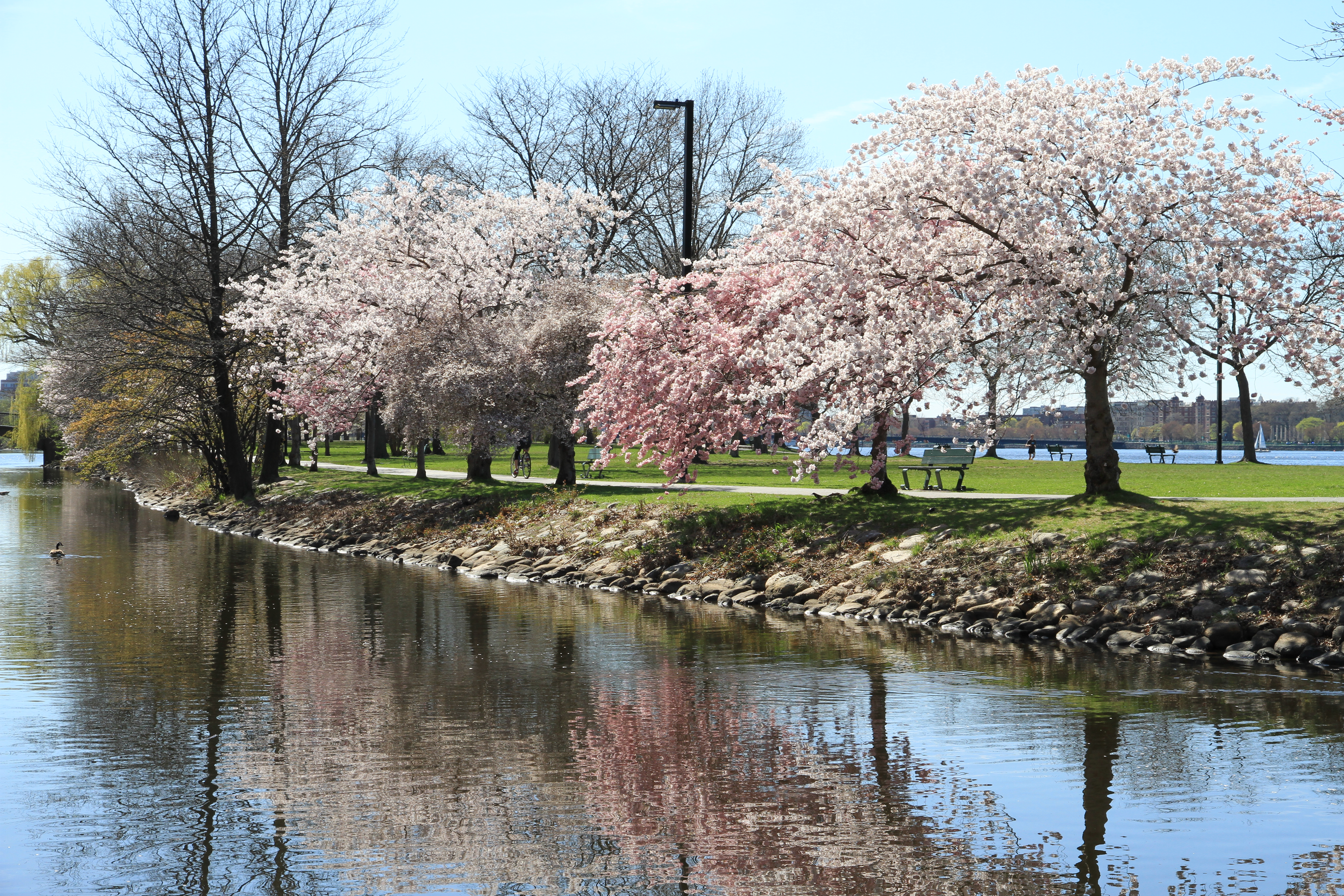
Charles River Esplanade in 2013

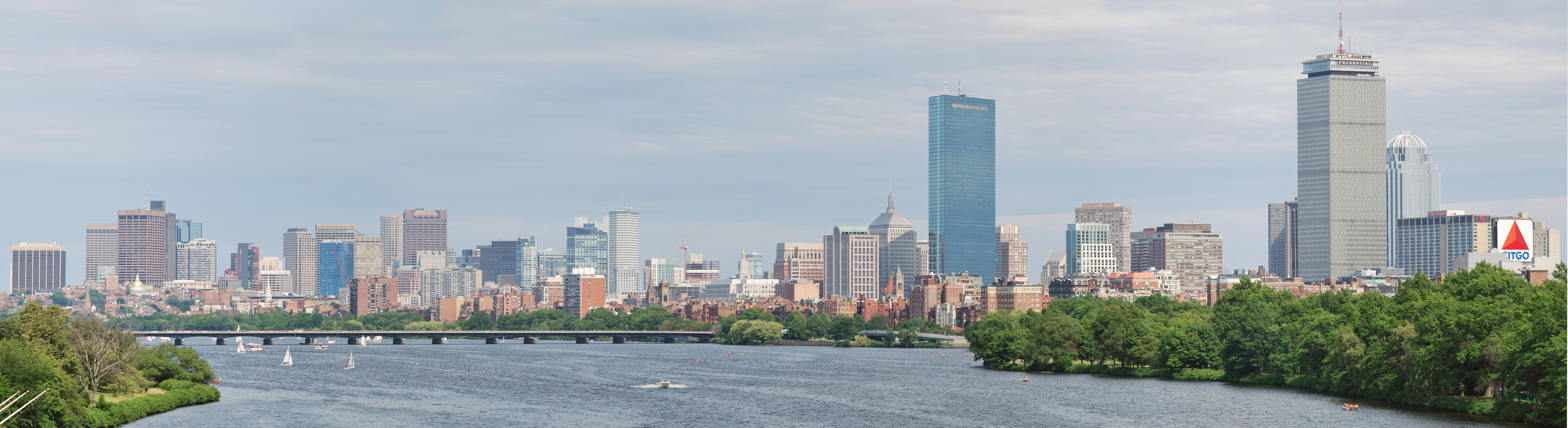
View of the Charles River and Downtown Boston from the Boston University Bridge

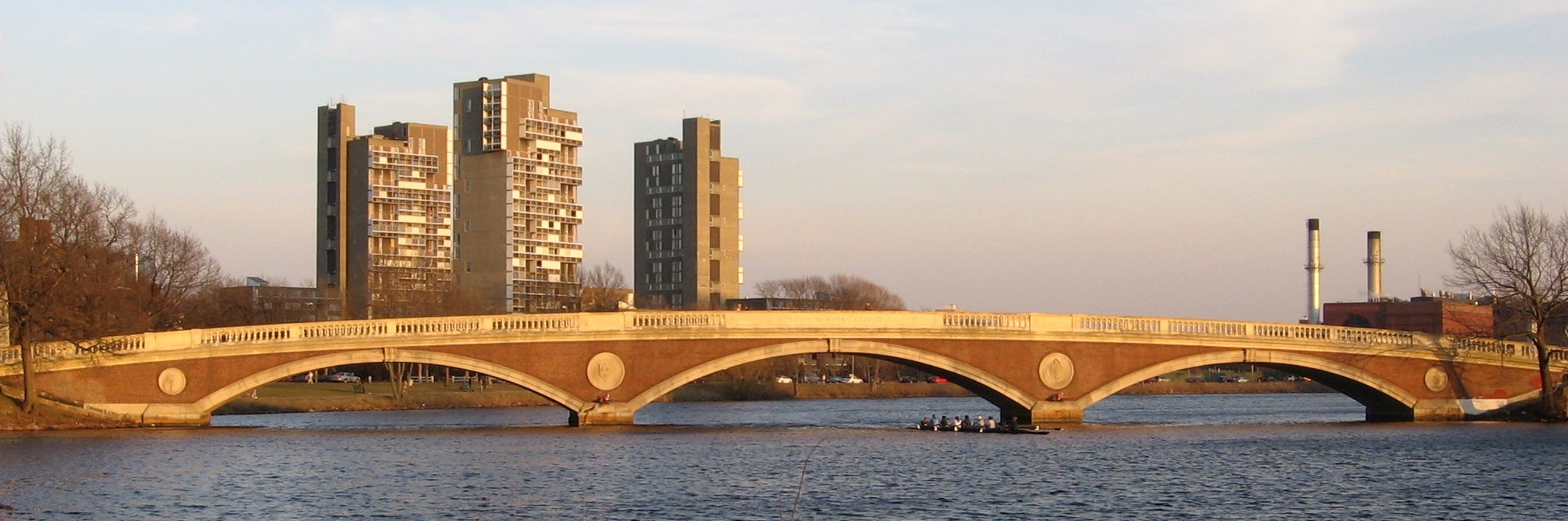
The John W. Weeks Bridge connecting Boston and Cambridge

== See also ==
- Head of the Charles Regatta
- List of Charles River boathouses
- List of crossings of the Charles River
- List of rivers of Massachusetts
- New Charles River Run
- Sudbury Aqueduct Linear District which crosses the river from Needham to Newton on the Echo Bridge
