= Memorial Drive (Cambridge) =

Street in Cambridge, Massachusetts

- Charles River Road
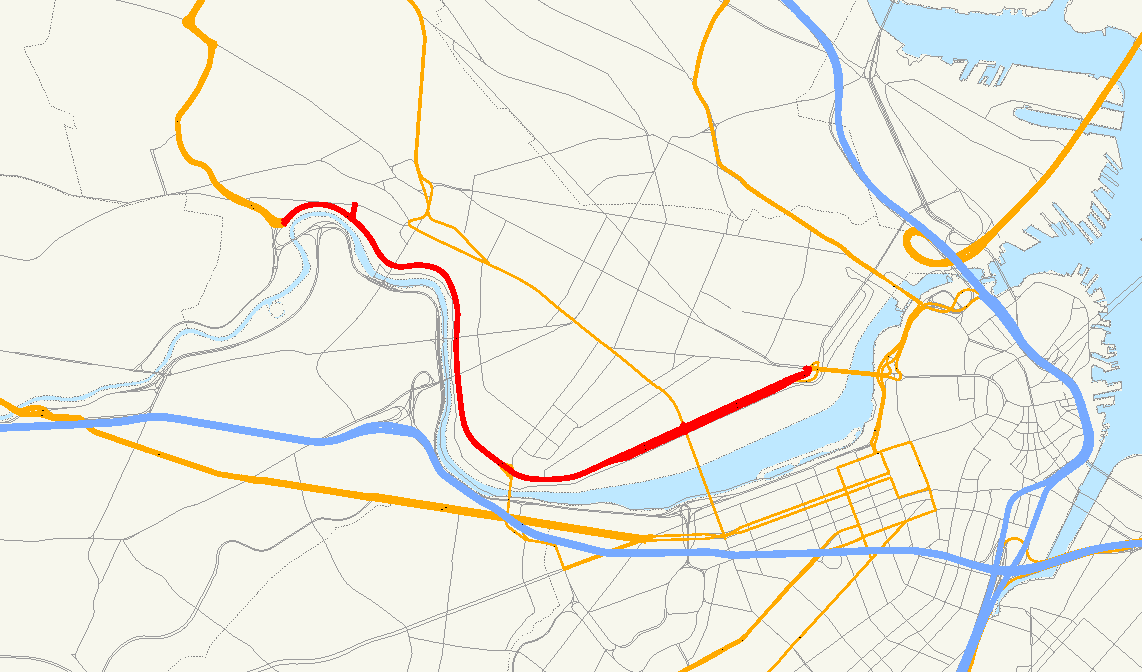
- Maintained by: Massachusetts DCR
- Length: 3.9 mi (6.3 km)
- Coordinates: 42°21′47″N 71°06′58″W
- West end: US 3 / Route 2 / Greenough Boulevard in Cambridge
- Major junctions: Route 2 in Cambridge; Route 2A in Cambridge
- East end: Route 3 / Main Street in Cambridge

Construction
- Inauguration: 1923

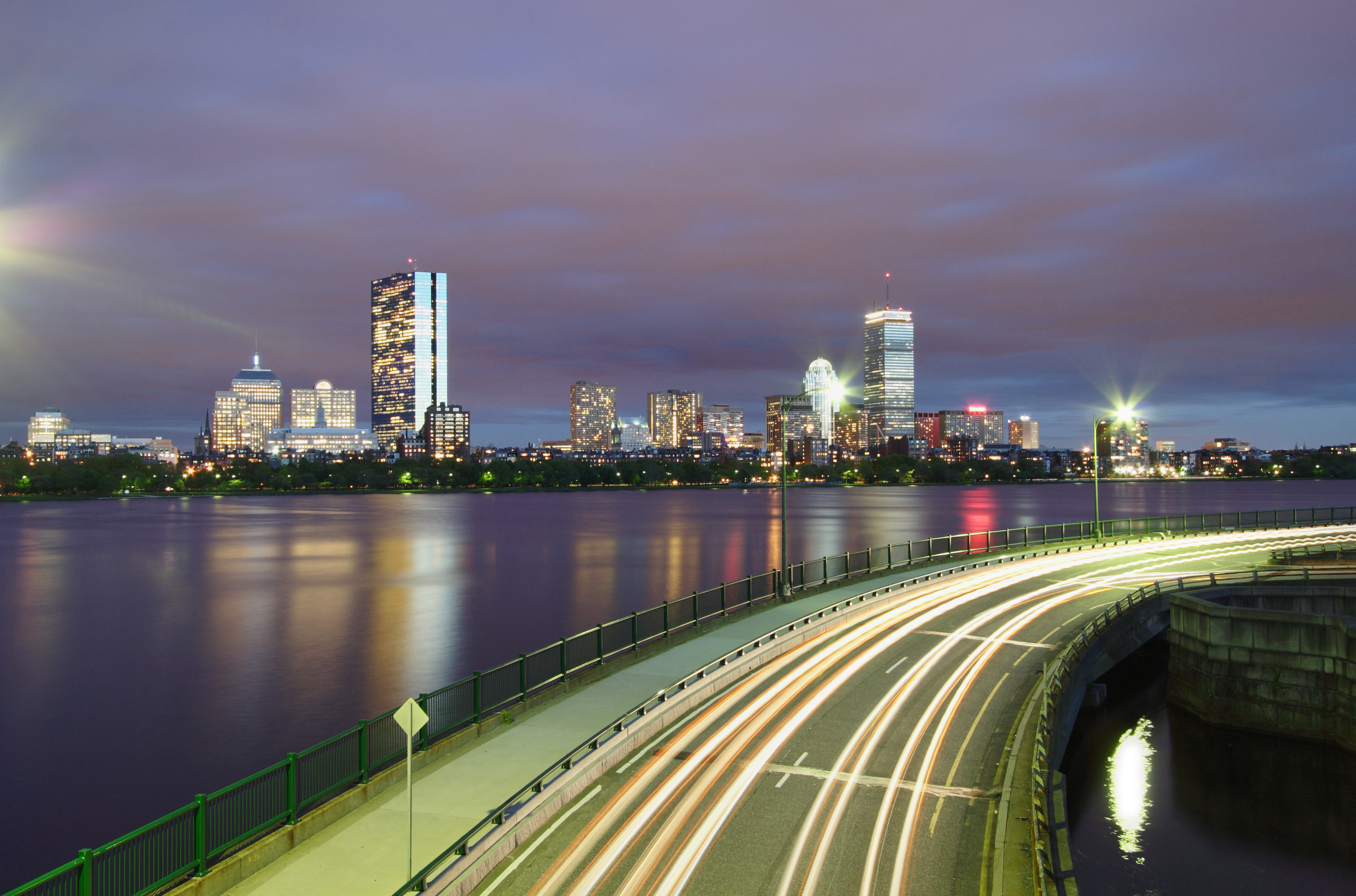
Memorial Drive along the Charles River at the Longfellow Bridge facing John Hancock Tower in Boston

Memorial Drive, informally Mem Drive, is a 3.9-mile (6.3 km) arterial road and parkway segment in Cambridge, Massachusetts, running east–west along the northern bank of the Charles River, United States. The western terminus, in West Cambridge, is at the junction of Greenough Boulevard, Gerry's Landing Road, and Fresh Pond Parkway. The eastern terminus is Main Street and the Longfellow Bridge near Kendall Square where the road along the river goes on to become Edwin H. Land Boulevard and Cambridge Parkway.

Memorial Drive is designated as U.S. Route 3 for most of its length, except the easternmost portion (0.7 miles (1.1 km)) just east of Massachusetts Avenue which is designated Massachusetts Route 3; US-3 and MA-Route 3 connect end-to-end and give the appearance of one continuous route. MA-Route 2 is co-designated with US-3 on Memorial Drive between the western terminus and the Boston University Bridge.

The Drive has achieved notoriety for the danger it presents to pedestrians and cyclists; five were killed between 2014 and 2026. The Department of Conservation and Recreation, which owns and maintains the Drive, received serious warnings about its safety.

The parkway runs parallel to the separate Boston parkway, Soldiers Field Road and Storrow Drive, on the opposite (south) bank of the river.

== History ==
The construction of Memorial Drive began in 1897 as part of the Charles River Basin project, a comprehensive urban renewal effort aimed at revitalizing the area along the Charles River. The project aimed to create a park-like environment along the river, enhancing recreational opportunities and providing open spaces for the public. Originally known as Charles River Road, the road was officially renamed "Memorial Drive" in 1923 to honor the memory of the Massachusetts soldiers who had served and given their lives during World War I.

In 2003, a two-mile section of Memorial Drive (from the Longfellow Bridge to the BU Bridge) was reconstructed ("Memorial Drive Greenway Phase I") as part of the Metropolitan District Commission's Historic Parkways Initiative to improve the safety and function of the roadway. This dropped one eastbound lane and some parking. The pedestrian and drainage infrastructure in this segment received a major upgrade ("Memorial Drive Greenway Phase II") in 2016. DCR widened and reconstructed on an emergency basis the sidewalks on the approach to the BU bridge on the river side (which were not rebuilt in the 2003 and 2016 projects) after a cyclist was struck by a car and killed there in September, 2024.

Reconstruction of the segment from JFK Street to the Eliot Bridge began in 2026 ("Memorial Drive Greenway Phase III), enacting a road diet by reducing travel from two to one lane in each direction (except at traffic lights), adding a separate and wider bicycle path, removing part of Gerry's Landing Road, and adding a pedestrian crossing at Sparks Street. The reduction to one lane will eliminate westbound roadway parking, but there will be a scull loading area added on the eastbound side on a different stretch, near the Cambridge Boat Club.

Reconstruction of the segment between JFK Street and the BU Bridge has been postponed indefinitely, until a more detailed traffic study can be performed. Cambridge residents objected to a road diet in this segment, so it was dropped from the DCR Phase III project scope. An estimated $46.5 MassDOT project to repair, rebuild, or replace the MassDOT-owned Reid Overpass (which bypasses the DCR-owned rotary) is scheduled and funded for 2027, with planning underway in 2024.

A gunman randomly attacked cars on Memorial Drive on May 11, 2026, injuring two people before he was non-fatally shot and arrested by police.

== Route description ==
Memorial Drive begins in West Cambridge, signed as US 3 south and Route 2 east, at a three-way junction (a former rotary) with Greenough Boulevard (which continues roughly westward along the river and provides access to the Eliot Bridge) and Fresh Pond Parkway, which runs roughly north and carries the US 3 / Route 2 concurrency westward. It proceeds generally southward, following the sinuous curves of the river, from which it is separated by a strip of parkland that varies considerably in its width. In the western stretch it has four undivided lanes, two in each direction, although parking is permitted on the outer westbound lane for a short section west of JFK Street.

After crossing River Street it turns more eastward at the Magazine Street beach, with Route 2 diverging southward at a rotary-like interchange with overpass to cross the BU Bridge into Boston. Soon afterward the road is lined on the north by the buildings of the main Massachusetts Institute of Technology (MIT) campus. A grassy median is introduced along this stretch, and the road crosses under Massachusetts Avenue (Route 2A), with ramps providing limited interchange options - due to the extremely low clearance of 9 feet (2.7 m), all trucks and buses must detour via the ramps.

Heading eastbound, the designation changes from US 3 to Route 3 at this interchange (and vice versa westbound). The grassy median continues to divide the road until its end near Kendall Square at the Longfellow Bridge. Edwin H. Land Boulevard splits off and continues north towards O'Brien Highway (Route 28) and Interstate 93. Route 3 turns east onto the Longfellow Bridge and also crosses into Boston. The median, where present, has occasional opportunities for reversing direction.

A median near Massachusetts Avenue requires executing a so-called Michigan left for certain turns.

Near the Magazine Street intersection, the Shell Oil Company "Spectacular" Sign sits on top of its namesake station (first appearing there in 1944). It is one of two oil company signs that currently hold Boston Landmark status (the Citgo sign behind Fenway Park is the other).

A number of Harvard and MIT dormitories are situated along much of the parkway as is the Charles River Bike Path. Roughly located in middle is the area known as Magazine Beach.

=== Major intersections ===
The entire route is in Cambridge, Middlesex County.

Location	mi	km	Destinations	Notes
West Cambridge	0.0	0.0	US 3 north / Route 2 west / Greenough Boulevard / Fresh Pond Parkway	Western terminus; US 3 / Route 2 continue west on Fresh Pond Parkway
Riverside	0.7	1.1	John F. Kennedy Street – Harvard Square	
Riverside	1.4	2.3	Western Avenue to I-90 (Mass PIke)	To Western Avenue Bridge
Cambridgeport	2.2	3.5	Route 2 east – Cambridgeport, Central Square	Eastern end of Route 2 concurrency; to Boston University Bridge
MIT Campus	3.2	5.1	Route 2A (Massachusetts Avenue) – Boston	Interchange with Michigan lefts; southern terminus of US 3; northern terminus of Route 3
MIT Campus	3.7	6.0	Wadsworth Street – Kendall Square	
MIT Campus	3.8	6.1	Edwin H. Land Boulevard east – Kendall Square	Interchange
MIT Campus	3.9	6.3	Route 3 south (Longfellow Bridge) – Boston	Eastern terminus; Route 3 continues on Longfellow Bridge
1.000 mi = 1.609 km; 1.000 km = 0.621 mi: Concurrency terminus; Route transition

== Issues ==
=== Deaths ===
Memorial Drive is notorious for the danger it presents to pedestrians and cyclists. From 2014 to 2026, at least five were killed on the Drive, and MassDOT has listed it as one of the state's top 200 crash clusters based on data from 2020 to 2022. The Department of Conservation and Recreation (DCR), which owns the Drive, received serious safety warnings as early as 2023. In the aftermath of a cyclist's death in 2024, the DCR scrambled to announce infrastructure changes to the Drive in the vicinity of the death.

=== Low clearance ===
Memorial Drive is posted with signs restricting its use to passenger vehicles only, and this is physically enforced by bridge and overpass clearances as low as 9 to 10 feet (2.7 to 3.0 m). In the Boston area, the frequent collisions of over-height vehicles with bridges are commonly called "Storrowing", after these occurrences on Storrow Drive, a similar roadway on the other side of the Charles River.

=== Weekend and holiday closures ===
In 1985, the Massachusetts Legislature passed a law requiring that the Metropolitan District Commission (later renamed the Department of Conservation and Recreation) to close Memorial Drive between Gerry’s Landing Road and Western Avenue between 11am to 7pm, every Sunday from the end of April until the second Sunday of November.

With the closure of indoor recreation opportunities resulting from the COVID-19 pandemic in 2020, the Cambridge City Council asked DCR to close the area on Saturdays as well. The DCR agreed and scheduled Saturday and Sunday closures for pedestrians and cyclists through 2022. In April 2023, the DCR announced that it would be returning to its pre-pandemic schedule, and would no longer close Memorial Drive for pedestrians and cyclists on Saturdays going forward. Parking is allowed on the westbound side of Memorial Drive for a short segment after JFK Street (except during rush hours, 7am-10am and 4pm-6pm), often surprising motorists in the right lane as there is no change in pavement markings.

== See also ==
- Soldiers Field Road and Storrow Drive, on the Boston side of the river
- Charles River Bike Path
- List of crossings of the Charles River
- Charles River Reservation#Riverbend Park
- Charles River Reservation
