= Storrow Drive =

Parkway along the Charles River in Boston

- James Jackson Storrow Drive; David G. Mugar Way
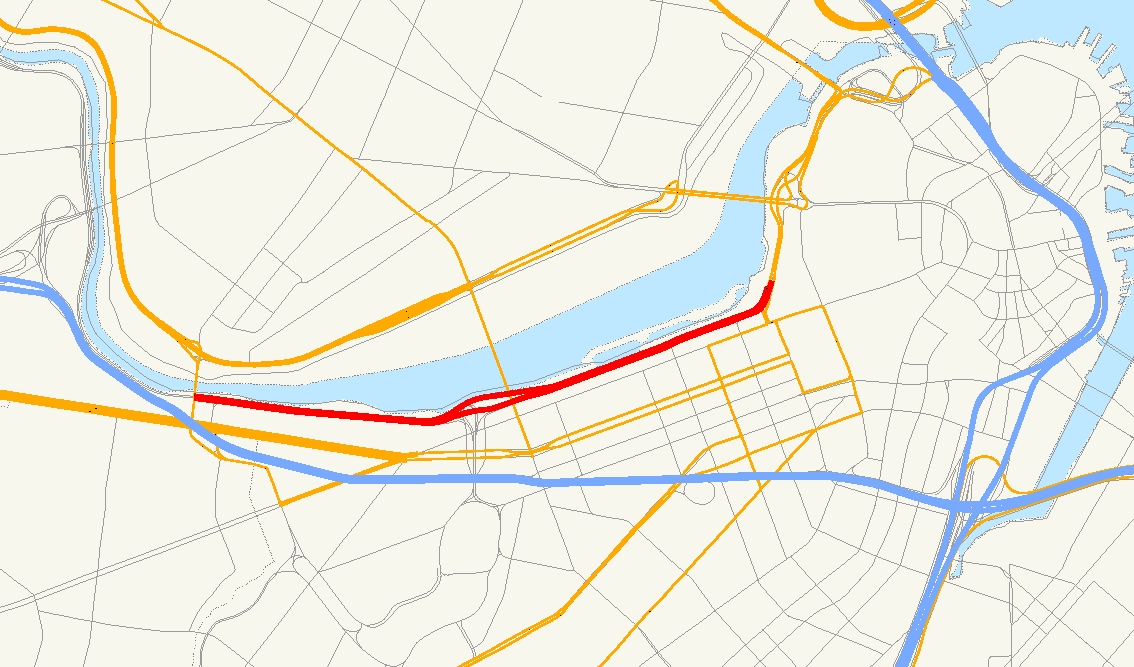
- Interactive map of Storrow Drive
- Maintained by: Massachusetts Department of Conservation and Recreation
- Length: 1.98 mi (3.19 km)
- Coordinates: 42°21′08″N 71°05′19″W
- West end: Soldiers Field Road in Fenway–Kenmore
- Major junctions: Route 2A in Back Bay; Route 28 in Back Bay
- East end: I-93 / US 1 / Route 3 / Route 28 in West End

Construction
- Inauguration: 1951

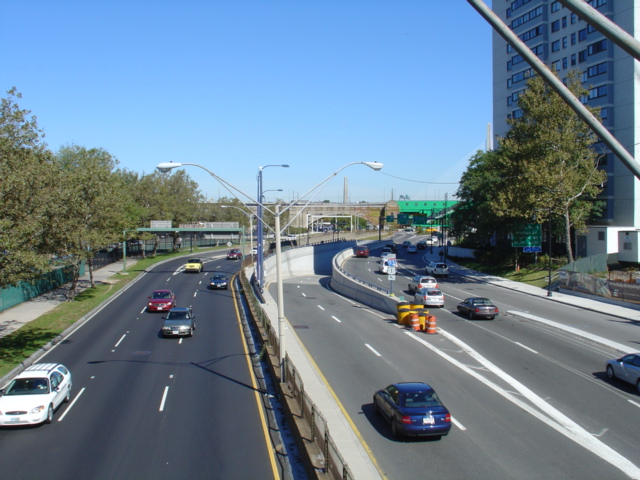
Storrow Drive, Leverett Circle Tunnel

Storrow Drive, officially James Jackson Storrow Memorial Drive, acts as a limited access arterial road and parkway in Boston, Massachusetts, running east–west along the southern bank of the Charles River. There is traditional pedestrian access along the linear path abutting the shores of the Charles River side of the road. Suburban commuters especially from northwest metro-Boston (MA-Route 2 and U.S. Route 3) use the route for arterial access to downtown locations, and as the primary access route for the Fenway-Kenmore neighborhood and Longwood Medical Area. Due to the route's unusually low height clearances it is restricted to automobiles; with trucks and or buses not being permitted.

== History ==
As Back Bay was filled-in it created the new space along what was formerly the Back Bay tidal marsh portion of the Charles River. The road is named for James J. Storrow, an investment banker who led a campaign to create the Charles River Basin and preserve and improve the riverbanks as a public park. Storrow had never advocated a arterial route beside the river, and Helen Storrow, his widow, publicly opposed it. As a further irony, the eponymous term "Storrowing" is used to refer to frequent crashes involving over-sized vehicles mistakenly driven onto the parkway and colliding with unusually low-clearance bridges and overpasses.

James Storrow had been instrumental in earlier projects along the Charles River, in particular the Charles River Dam. Additions to the Charles River Esplanade had been made during the 1930s only by omitting an important part of the project, a proposed highway from the Longfellow Bridge to the Cottage Farm (Boston University) Bridge, which had provoked tremendous protest. After Helen Storrow, the wife of the now deceased James Storrow, supported a group opposed to the highway, it was dropped; part of the funding was to have come from a million-dollar gift from her. Soon after Helen Storrow's death in 1944, a new proposal for the construction of the highway was pushed through the 156th Massachusetts General Court. In spite of local opposition, the bill approving construction of the highway and naming it after James Storrow was passed in 1949.

=== Construction ===
Construction took place in the years 1950–1951. As part of the attempt to preserve park land, any land used by the highway had to be replaced by reclaiming new land along the shoreline. Storrow Drive was officially opened in a ribbon cutting ceremony by Governor Paul A. Dever on June 15, 1951.

An on-ramp leading from southbound Massachusetts Avenue to eastbound Storrow Drive was constructed but later removed, leaving an island of greenspace between the inbound and outbound carriageways. Overpasses to The Fenway via Charlesgate and in the vicinity of Massachusetts General Hospital were completed a few years later; the Arthur Fiedler Footbridge was completed in 1953. In 1960, high-pressure air from a sewage tunnel under construction caused a geyser-like eruption and damaged the roadway near the BU bridge. The pedestrian overpass near the Longfellow Bridge was constructed in 1962. A "Reverse Curve" sign near downtown was vandalized to say "Reverse the Curse", a reference to the Curse of the Bambino; the sign was removed after the Red Sox won the 2004 World Series.

== Route description ==
Between 1958 and 1971, Storrow Drive was designated Massachusetts Routes C1 and C9. Prior to 1989, Storrow Drive also carried the U.S. Route 1 designation; US 1 is now routed concurrently with Interstate 93 through the O'Neill Tunnel.

Today, the segment between the interchange with Route 28 near Copley Square and Leverett Circle, the road is officially David G. Mugar Way (formerly Embankment Road), although still signed as Storrow Drive. The entirety of this segment is concurrent with Route 28. To the west, Storrow Drive ends and becomes Soldiers Field Road at its partial junction with the Boston University Bridge (Route 2). In between, westbound Storrow Drive has a junction with the Harvard Bridge (Route 2A, Massachusetts Avenue).

Both Storrow Drive and Soldiers Field Road are maintained by the Massachusetts Department of Conservation and Recreation and are part of the parkway system interconnecting the Emerald Necklace in Boston and Brookline. Together with Memorial Drive and the Cambridge Parkway, Storrow Drive is also part of the Charles River Basin Historic District (listed in the National Register of Historic Places).

=== Exit list ===
Mileposts continue east from Soldiers Field Road. The entire route is in Boston, Suffolk County. All exits are unnumbered.

Location	mi	km	Destinations	Notes
Fenway–Kenmore	4.1	6.6	Soldiers Field Road west – Newton, Watertown	Continuation beyond University Road
Fenway–Kenmore	4.1	6.6	University Road – Brookline	Eastbound exit and entrance; serves Boston University; to US 20
Back Bay	4.9	7.9	Kenmore Square, Fenway	Access via Charlesgate; former alignment of US 1
Back Bay	5.0	8.0	Route 2A west – Cambridge, Arlington	Westbound exit only
Back Bay	5.6	9.0	Route 28 south – Copley Square, Back Bay	Route 28 continues south; Storrow Drive becomes David G. Mugar Way
Back Bay	5.8	9.3	Downtown Boston	Eastbound exit only
Beacon Hill	6.2	10.0	Route 3 north – Government Center, Kendall Square, Cambridge	Route 3 continues north
West End	6.5	10.5	I-93 north / US 1 north – Tobin Bridge, Concord, NH	Eastbound exit only (via tunnel)
West End	6.6	10.6	Route 28 north (O'Brien Highway) / Martha Road – Cambridge, Stoneham, North Station	Route 28 continues north via Charles River Dam Road
West End	6.6	10.6	I-93 / US 1 / Route 3 south – Tobin Bridge, Concord, NH, Quincy, Logan Airport	Leverett Circle; Route 3 continues south; northbound exit via Leverett Connector; Exit 18 on I-93 / US 1
1.000 mi = 1.609 km; 1.000 km = 0.621 mi: Incomplete access; Route transition

== Issues ==
=== Traffic issues ===
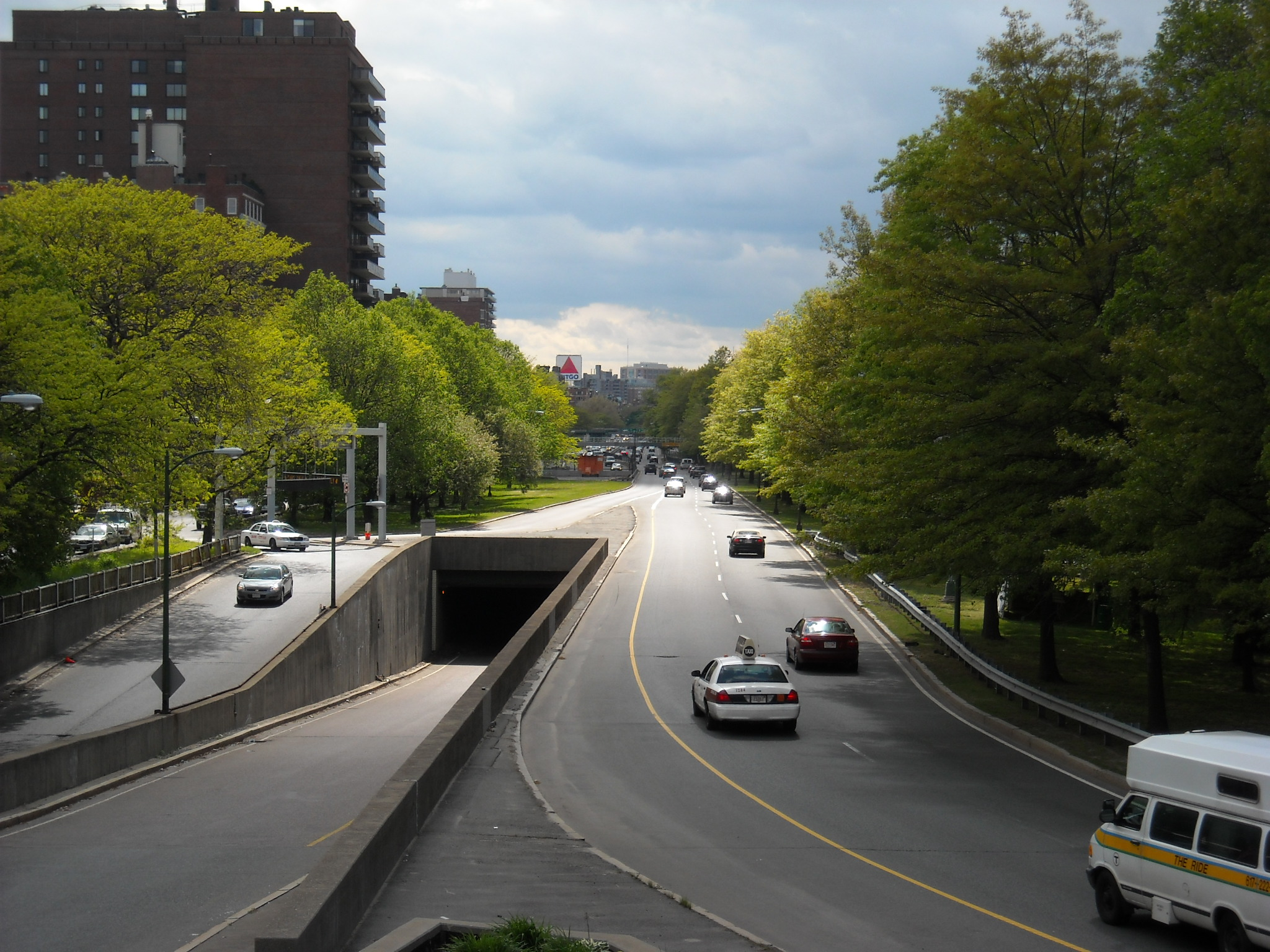
Storrow Drive mid-afternoon

The road is notorious for speeding and aggressive driving because police enforcement along the road is difficult without a breakdown lane. Radio traffic reports have warned motorists about ponding on Storrow Drive, which occurs when snow and frozen ground prevent water from draining properly into storm drains. The underpasses also commonly flood during heavy rains, sometimes stalling low-riding cars. Additional problems include narrow lanes and very limited visibility on short entrance ramps.

=== Concert parking ===
During some summer night concerts at the Hatch Shell, many drivers park their cars in the outbound lanes of Storrow Drive. The free concerts and fireworks displays attract 200,000 people, and many take advantage of the free parking which may be allowed at those times. Storrow Drive east of Massachusetts Avenue is usually closed to traffic and open to pedestrians and cyclists during the July 4th celebration at the Esplanade.

=== Low clearance accidents ===
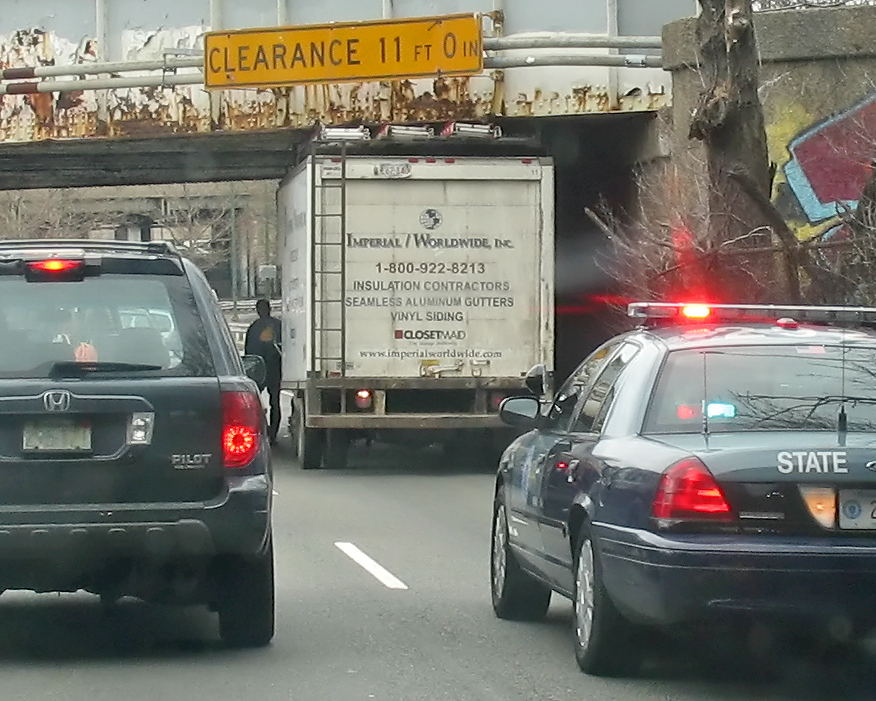
Bridge-strike by a truck. ("Storrowed") below the Grand Junction Railroad Bridge.

There is an abundance of signs giving road clearance height. Despite the signs, a truck or other large vehicle such as a bus will occasionally get wedged under a bridge, which causes traffic to back up for several miles. In one incident a truck full of scissors became stuck and spilled its cargo, causing more than 30 cars to get flat tires. There is a 10 foot (3.0 m) height limit for the entire parkway.

Local media has taken to referring to these kinds of accidents as a truck "Storrowing" or being "Storrowed". The city of Boston issues annual advisories in August to those renting box trucks for college move-ins, to avoid the area's low-clearance parkway system, including Storrow Drive. Traditionally, locals have often blamed the "Storrowing" incidents on college students.

However, many accidents have involved professional truck drivers using phone GPS software databases intended only for passenger cars. Routing software which is specialized for high-clearance trucks and buses is recommended instead. Many companies local to Boston train their drivers on how to avoid "Storrowing", but truck drivers from other areas may not know about the low clearances.

In August 2021 it is estimated that over 30 trucks had found their way on to the route and either struck or came close to striking the overhead bridges. The state and local municipalities continue to try placing new signage to alert more modern trucks not conforming to the antiquated height standards of the route Additional notices are attempted at being sent to moving truck companies to inform patrons of non conforming height standards. The commonwealth continues public sensitization over the problem to help avert further incidents.

=== Pedestrian crossings ===
Because Storrow Drive is a high-speed road way, pedestrian access is limited to only the Charles River side of the road. To connect the Charles River Esplanade and Storrow Drive (a popular park and recreational area along the south bank of the river) to adjacent Boston neighborhoods, a number of pedestrian overpasses have been constructed. Listed in order from downstream to upstream, they are:

- Blossom Street bridge (near Massachusetts General Hospital)
- Frances Appleton Bridge (at Cambridge Street, next to Longfellow Bridge)
- Arthur Fiedler Bridge (connecting to the Hatch Memorial Shell near Arlington Street)
- Dartmouth Street bridge
- Fairfield Street bridge
- Harvard Bridge (at Massachusetts Avenue)
- Silber Way bridge
- Boston University Marsh Chapel bridge
- Boston University Bridge

== Future ==
The Storrow Drive Tunnel north of Clarendon, Berkeley and Arlington Streets was built in 1951. By mid-2007, the Department of Conservation and Recreation determined that fully repairing extensive damage to the tunnel may be impossible because it was not waterproofed when it was built. Rebuilding was projected to cost hundreds of millions and closure of the critical highway.

Former Boston Mayor Thomas Menino proposed covering Storrow Drive near the pedestrian Arthur Fiedler Bridge, replacing the old overpass with a wide, ground-level park space that would better connect the green space of the Public Garden with the Esplanade. Former Massachusetts Secretary of Transportation Fred Salvucci suggested that the roadway should be removed in a 2009 interview.

== See also ==
- Charles River Bike Path
- Charles River Reservation
- List of crossings of the Charles River
- Memorial Drive, on the opposite side of the river in Cambridge
