= Soldiers Field Road =

Street in Boston, Massachusetts

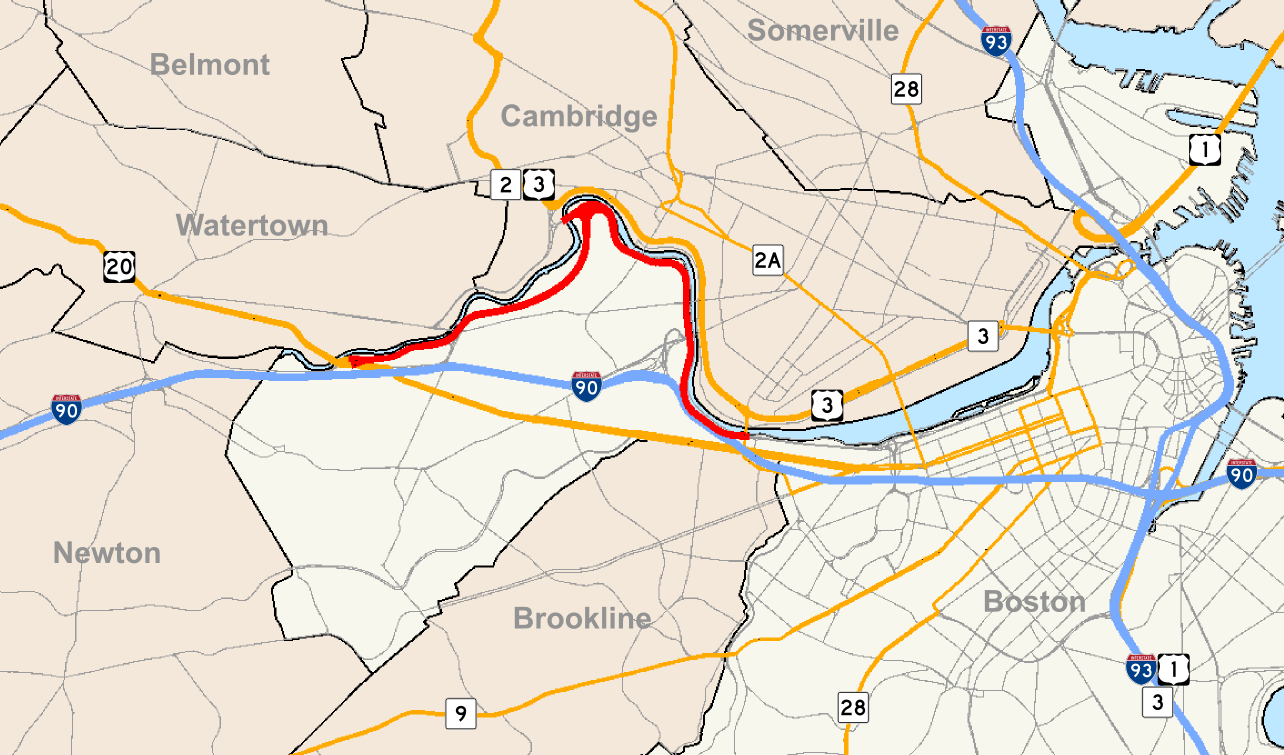
- Soldiers Field Road highlighted in red
- Maintained by: Massachusetts DCR
- Length: 4.3 mi (6.9 km)
- Coordinates: 42°22′22″N 71°7′45″W
- West end: US 20 in Brighton
- Major junctions: I-90 / Mass Pike in Allston
- East end: Storrow Drive in Fenway–Kenmore

Soldiers Field Road is a major crosstown parkway in Boston, Massachusetts, running west to east from U.S. Route 20 in the northwest corner of Brighton to the Boston University Bridge. It follows the course of the Charles River and also passes by the campuses of Harvard University and Boston University. The road is named for the area south of the road on a bend in the Charles River. On June 5, 1890, Henry Lee Higginson presented Harvard College a gift of 31 acres (130,000 m2) of land, which he called Soldiers Field, given in honor of his friends who died in the Civil War: James Savage, Jr., Charles Russell Lowell, Edward Barry Dalton, Stephen George Perkins, James Jackson Lowell, and Robert Gould Shaw. This land later became the home of Harvard Crimson athletics.

Although considered a "major crosstown street", the road has a 10-foot (3.04 m) height restriction due to viaduct crossings. In 2013 one of these crossings was the site of a serious bus crash. Speed limits range from 30 to 40 miles per hour (48 to 64 km/h) on various segments of the road.

== Route description ==
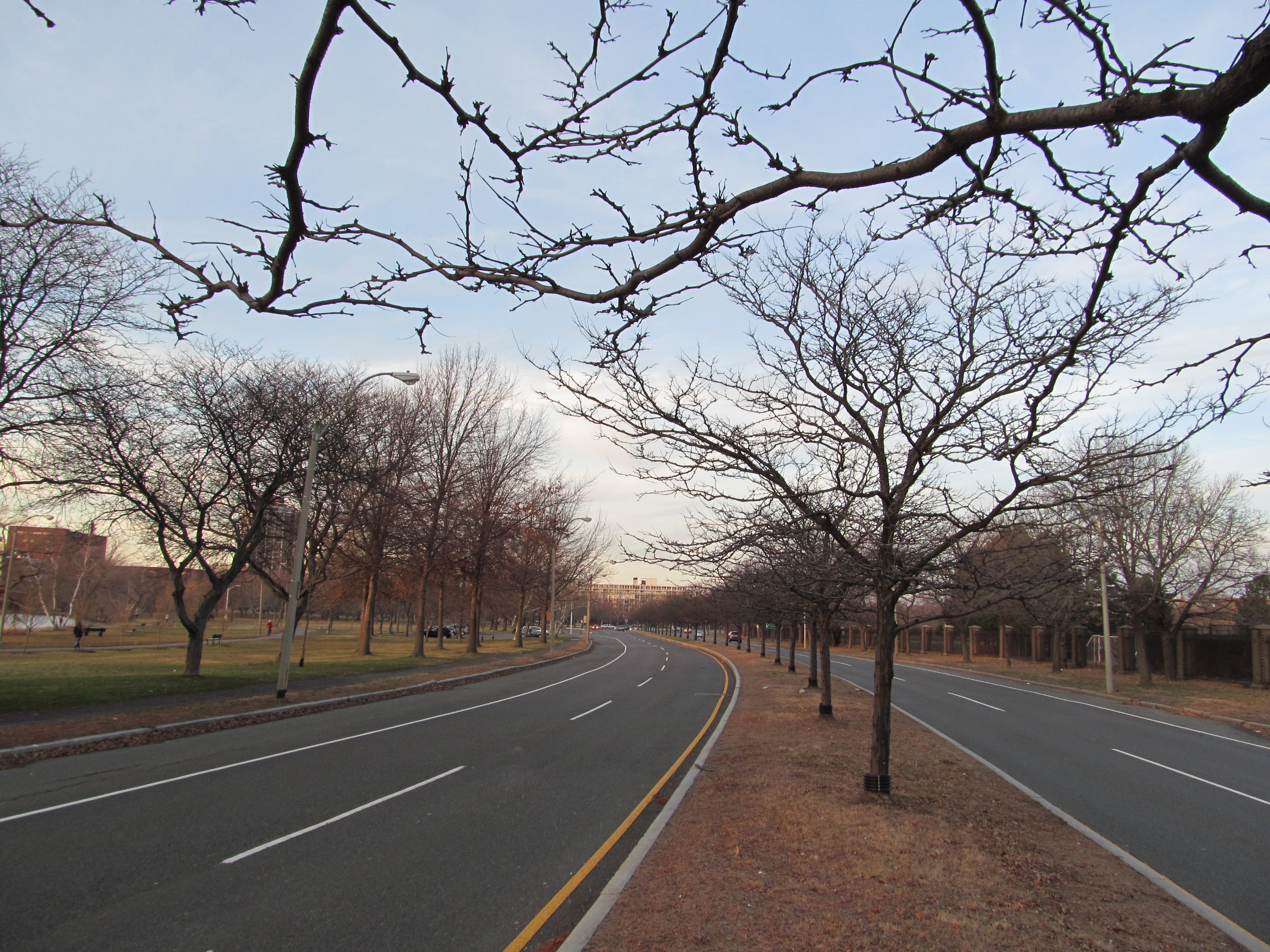
Looking eastbound in the Allston neighborhood

Soldiers Field Road is one link in a nearly nine-mile continuous roadway along the southern bank of the Charles River, continuing to the east as Storrow Drive, David G. Mugar Way, and Embankment Road, and to the west as Nonantum Road.

The road begins at the intersection with North Beacon Street and Nonantum Road. For the first 0.4 miles (0.64 km) there is no median division, and there is at-grade access to local businesses. The road then passes under the Arsenal Street Bridge access roads. The road then passes south of the Northeastern University Boathouse and Charles River Community Garden, which it provides access to on the westbound side of the road. One half-mile east of the Arsenal Street Bridge there is a footbridge crossing over the road between Telford Street and the Artesani Playground, which is part of Christian Herter Park. There is access to and from the park at an at-grade intersection with Everett Street. As the road turns north it passes the WBZ studio and Smith Playground before following the perimeter of the Soldiers Field athletic facility, home to Harvard Athletics. The closest portions of the facility to the road are the field hockey field, tennis courts and practice fields. At the top of the bend in the Charles River the road intersects with the Eliot Bridge, which heads west from the northern end of the bend, providing access to Greenough Boulevard, Mount Auburn Hospital and Mount Auburn Cemetery in neighboring Cambridge. As the road and the Charles bends southward, it passes Jordan Field (the soccer field), the Palmer Dixon Center, Dillon Field House, Lavietes Pavilion and Blodgett Pool to the southwest and the Newell Boathouse to the northeast of the road.

Soldiers Field Road then passes under North Harvard Street as it joins Anderson Memorial Bridge. It continues eastward past the Harvard Business School campus, where the river makes another bend at the Weeks Footbridge. The road then passes under the approach to the Western Avenue Bridge, where traffic passes one way from Cambridge into the Allston neighborhood. Just 300 yards (0.17 mi) later, the road passes under the approach road between Cambridge Street and the River Street Bridge, which returns traffic from Allston to Cambridge. To the south of this bridge the road passes to the north and east of rail yards before paralleling the Massachusetts Turnpike from just east of the Allston tollbooths and past Boston University until just west of the Grand Junction Railroad Bridge. At this point the road and river split from the Mass Pike and pass under the Boston University Bridge, at which point Soldiers Field Road becomes Storrow Drive.

== History ==
Portions of the current alignment of Soldiers Field Road were originally part of the Charles River Speedway, which was built in 1899. The speedway ran from near Market Street and the Arsenal Street bridge, to the site of the Eliot Bridge (which wasn't built until 1950). The only surviving building relating to the speedway is the Charles River Reservation (Speedway)-Upper Basin Headquarters, which formerly housed administrative and logistical personnel for the Metropolitan District Commission.

The portion of Soldiers Field Road nearest the Boston University Bridge is expected to be rebuilt as part of a major project to straighten the Turnpike.

== Major intersections ==
The entire route is in Boston, Suffolk County. All exits are unnumbered.

Location	mi	km	Destinations	Notes
Brighton	0.0	0.0	US 20 (Beacon Street) / Nonantum Road west – Watertown Square, Newton, Brighton Center	Traffic circle
Allston	0.7	1.1	Western Avenue / Arsenal Street – Brighton Center, Watertown	Interchange
Allston	2.0	3.2	Route 2 / US 3 / Fresh Pond Parkway – Arlington	Partial interchange
Allston	2.5	4.0	Harvard Street – Harvard Square, Allston, Cambridge	Interchange
Allston	3.1	5.0	I-90 / Mass Pike / Western Avenue / Cambridge Street – Central Square, Cambridge	Interchange; exit 131 on I-90 / Mass Pike
Fenway–Kenmore	4.1	6.6	University Road – Brookline	Interchange; eastbound exit and entrance
Fenway–Kenmore	4.1	6.6	Storrow Drive east	Continuation beyond University Road
1.000 mi = 1.609 km; 1.000 km = 0.621 mi: Electronic toll collection; Incomplete access

== See also ==
- Memorial Drive, on the opposite side of the river in Cambridge
- Charles River Bike Path
- Charles River Reservation
- List of crossings of the Charles River
