= West Cambridge, Massachusetts =

West Cambridge, Massachusetts may refer to:

- An old name for the municipality of Arlington, Massachusetts
- West Cambridge (neighborhood), Cambridge, Massachusetts
