= Salem–Auburn Streets Historic District =

Historic district in Massachusetts, United States

- U.S. National Register of Historic Places
- U.S. Historic district
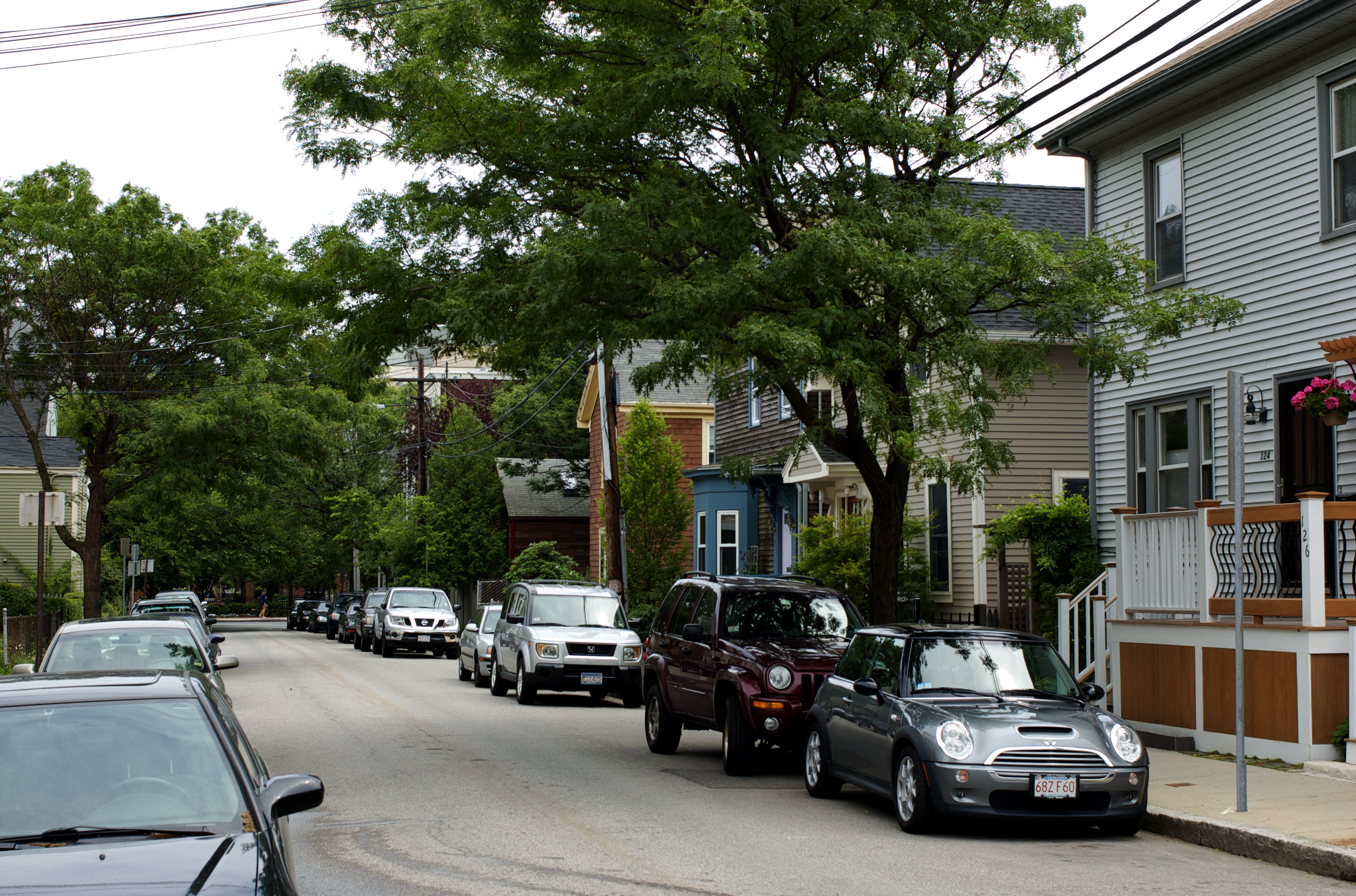

- Location within Massachusetts Location within the United States
- Location: Salem and Auburn Streets, Cambridge, Massachusetts
- Coordinates: 42°21′46″N 71°6′14″W
- Area: 2 acres (0.81 ha)
- Architectural style: Greek Revival, Georgian, Federal
- MPS: Cambridge MRA
- NRHP reference No.: 82001975
- Added to NRHP: April 13, 1982

The Salem–Auburn Streets Historic District is a residential historic district at Salem and Auburn Streets in Cambridge, Massachusetts. The district includes a collection of houses that is among the oldest in the Cambridgeport section of the city, and includes most of the houses on two blocks of these streets. The district was added to the National Register of Historic Places in 1982.

== Description and history ==
Salem and Auburn Streets are two short residential streets located near the center of Cambridge's Cambridgeport neighborhood, which is bounded by River Street, Massachusetts Avenue, the Charles River, and the Grand Junction Railroad tracks. Auburn Street runs northwest to southeast across the neighborhood, paralleling Massachusetts Avenue. On the block of Auburn between Pearl Street and Brookline Street, Salem Street is a one-block street extending southwest to Watson Street. The district includes most of the properties on these two blocks.

At the beginning of the 19th century Cambridgeport was a relatively small village, with narrow streets. The area did not see significant organized development until the mid-19th century. The houses along Salem Street and this single block of Auburn Street were all built between about 1800 and 1845, before this later development took place, and are the largest cluster of houses from that period that survive. The ten historically significant houses are typically vernacular versions of Late Georgian, Federal period, and Greek Revival architecture. One of the more unusual rarities is a two-story brick Federal style house at 15 Salem Street.

== See also ==
- National Register of Historic Places listings in Cambridge, Massachusetts
