= Fresh Pond Parkway =

Parkway in Cambridge, Massachusetts

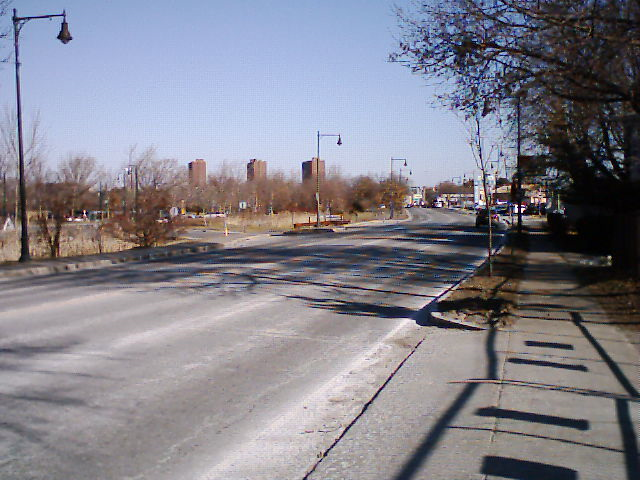
- Fresh Pond Parkway in February 2010
- Interactive map of Fresh Pond Parkway
- Maintained by: Department of Conservation and Recreation
- Length: 1.0 mi (1.6 km)
- Location: Cambridge, Middlesex County, Massachusetts
- South end: US 3 / Route 2 in Cambridge
- North end: US 3 / Route 2 / Route 16 in Cambridge

Construction
- Completion: 1899
- Fresh Pond Parkway-Metropolitan Park System of Greater Boston
- U.S. National Register of Historic Places
- U.S. Historic district
- Location: Cambridge, Massachusetts
- Built: 1899
- Architect: Charles Eliot, Olmstead Brothers
- MPS: Metropolitan Park System of Greater Boston MPS
- NRHP reference No.: 04001429
- Added to NRHP: January 5, 2005

Fresh Pond Parkway is a historic park and parkway on the western end of Cambridge, Massachusetts. It is part of the Metropolitan Park System of Greater Boston. The parkway was built in 1899 and added to the National Register of Historic Places in 2005.

Fresh Pond Parkway is a four-lane road (two lanes in each direction) stretching from Mount Auburn Street on its southern end to a rotary at Concord Avenue (formerly Cambridge and Concord Turnpike) and Alewife Brook Parkway to the north. Much of the parkway acts as the eastern boundary for portions of the city's municipal Fresh Pond reservoir area and connects the reservoir to the Charles River Reservation.

The parkway is part of Massachusetts Route 2 (Route 2) and U.S. Route 3 (US 3) for its entire length. The portion north of Huron Avenue is also part of Route 16.

== Route description ==
Fresh Pond Parkway begins at a large interchange with Mount Auburn Street, a major east-west road in western Cambridge, and Gerry's Landing Road, which serves as the connection between the parkway and Memorial Drive, Greenough Boulevard, and the Eliot Bridge over the Charles River. A median initially separates the north and southbound lanes, which gradually narrows to little more than a jersey barrier at the intersection with Brattle Street, about 0.25 miles (0.40 km) to the northwest. This section bisects Lowell Memorial Park, with the Elmwood estate the only residence on the east.

North of Brattle Street, the parkway has no median. In 0.4 miles (0.64 km) it reaches Huron Avenue, where Route 16 joins the roadway from the west. This section is residential on both sides. The southern portion of the parkway is canopied by mature trees, and has concrete sidewalks on each side, separated by a narrow green strip.

North of the Huron Avenue junction, the road turns northeast to skirt Fresh Pond, crossing the former Watertown Branch Railroad right-of-way, and running for 0.5 miles (0.80 km) to a rotary with Concord Avenue. It remains residential on the east side, until Lexington Avenue, when that side becomes commercial. The west side is lined by the Fresh Pond Reservation, with southbound access to a public parking area (limited to city residents) and the facilities of the Cambridge public water supply. From the rotary it proceeds west about 0.2 miles (0.32 km) to its end at a larger rotary, where Concord Avenue continues west, and Alewife Brook Parkway continues north, carrying all three numbered route designations. The south side of this section continues to be the Fresh Pond Reservation, and the north side is heavily commercialized.

== History ==
A northbound parkway from the Charles River through western Cambridge was proposed by the landscape designer Charles Eliot as early as 1892. Eliot, a Cambridge resident, had already assisted the city in laying out the Fresh Pond Reservation lands, and believed that a parkway would provide improved access between the Charles River and the Middlesex Fells Reservation. In 1898 the Metropolitan Parks Commission, the predecessor of the Metropolitan District Commission (MDC) and today's Massachusetts Department of Conservation and Recreation (DCR), began acquiring land for the parkway with the purchase of Lowell Park, formerly a portion of the Elmwood estate. Land takings continued in 1899, and the section between Gerry's Landing and Huron Avenue was completed in 1900. The northern section was completed in 1928-1930, following disputes between the MDC and the city over its route and funding. The connection of Gerry's Landing Road to Eliot Bridge, locally considered part of the parkway, was completed in 1958.

As part of the construction of a new water purification plant on Fresh Pond, the northern section of the parkway was reconstructed. The work included new sidewalks, a bike path on the west side, and roadway realignment. Work was completed in 2002.

== Major intersections ==
The entire route is in Cambridge, Middlesex County.

Location	mi	km	Destinations	Notes
West Cambridge	0.0	0.0	US 3 south / Route 2 east to I-90 / Memorial Drive / Soldiers Field Road / Greenough Boulevard – Boston	Routes continue south along Gerrys Landing Road
West Cambridge	0.5	0.80	Route 16 west / Huron Avenue east – Watertown, West Newton	Route 16 continues west along Huron Avenue
Cambridge Highlands	1.0	1.6	US 3 north / Route 2 west / Route 16 east / Concord Avenue east – Harvard Square	Traffic circle; all routes continue west along Concord Avenue
1.000 mi = 1.609 km; 1.000 km = 0.621 mi: Route transition
