= Gentrification in the United States =

Wealthier people displacing poorer residents

Gentrification in the United States is commonly associated with an influx of higher-income movers into historically divested neighborhoods with existing, working-class residents, often resulting in increases in property prices and investment into new developments. Displacement and gentrification are also linked, with consequences of gentrification including displacement of pre-existing residents and cultural erasure of the historic community. In the United States, discussions surrounding gentrification require critical analysis of race and other demographic data in examining the inequalities and disparities between existing residents, the community, new buyers, and developers caused by gentrification.

== Changes ==
=== Crime ===
Gentrification is marked by changing demographics and, thus changing social order and norms. In some cases, when affluent households move into a working-class community of residents (often primarily Black or Latino communities), the new residents' different perceptions of acceptable neighborhood behavior and cultural activity of pre-existing residents may be in conflict with the established norms of the pre-existing community. This may be associated with increased police calls and police presence in these areas, due to greater reports on issues such as loitering, noise, etc.

Gentrification has a goal of decreasing crime rates in neighborhoods that once were deemed high-crime areas, after a while it studies shown a decrease overall however, some studies noticed little difference in property crime rates. Researchers have come to the conclusion it may take additional years of gentrification to see a notable decline in property crime rates in some cities Research has been conducted that has shown a significant change in crime rates due to gentrification.

=== Displacement ===
A 2018 study found evidence that gentrification displaces renters, but not homeowners. Despite that, homeowners still face negative consequences such as increased tax burden. The displacement of low-income rental residents is commonly referenced as a negative aspect of gentrification by its opponents.

Also, other research has shown that low-income families are less likely to be displaced in gentrifying neighborhoods than in non-gentrifying neighborhoods. A common theory has been that as affluent people move into a poorer neighborhood, housing prices increase as a result, causing poorer people to move out of the neighborhood. Although there is evidence showing gentrification may modestly raise real estate prices, other studies claim that lower crime and an improved local economy outweigh the increased housing costs—displacement tends to decrease in gentrifying areas such as these as a result. A 2016 study found "that vulnerable residents, those with low credit scores and without mortgages, are generally no more likely to move from gentrifying neighborhoods compared with their counterparts in non-gentrifying neighborhoods." A 2019 study which followed children from low-income families in New York City found no evidence that gentrification was associated with changes in mobility rates. The study also found "that children who start out in a gentrifying area experience larger improvements in some aspects of their residential environment than their counterparts who start out in persistently low-socioeconomic status areas."

There have been studies conducted that show gentrification taking place in non-white low income neighborhoods that affect neighborhoods in a different way. Gentrification is happening all over the country with racial composition being a contributing factor. All over the United States neighborhoods are being targeted and an increase in Black and Hispanic people are being displaced. Gentrification is also causing racial inequality in some neighborhoods leaving people displaced. Culture is being change and people are being forced to adapt to this change.

=== Social changes ===
Many of the social effects of gentrification have been based on extensive theories about how socioeconomic status of an individual's neighborhood will shape one's behavior and future. These studies have prompted "social mix policies" to be widely adopted by governments to promote the process and its positive effects, such as lessening the strain on public resources that are associated with de-concentrating poverty. However, more specific research has shown that gentrification does not necessarily correlate with "social mixing," and that the effects of the new composition of a gentrified neighborhood can both weaken as well as strengthen community cohesion.

Housing confers social status, and the changing norms that accompany gentrification translate to a changing social hierarchy. The process of gentrification mixes people of different socioeconomic strata, thereby congregating a variety of expectations and social norms. The change gentrification brings in class distinction also has been shown to contribute to residential polarization by income, education, household composition, and race. It conveys a social rise that brings new standards in consumption, particularly in the form of excess and superfluity, to the area that were not held by the pre-existing residents. These differing norms can lead to conflict, which potentially serves to divide changing communities. Often this comes at a larger social cost to the original residents of the gentrified area whose displacement is met with little concern from the gentry or the government. Clashes that result in increased police surveillance, for example, would more adversely affect young minorities who are also more likely to be the original residents of the area.

=== Economic shifts ===
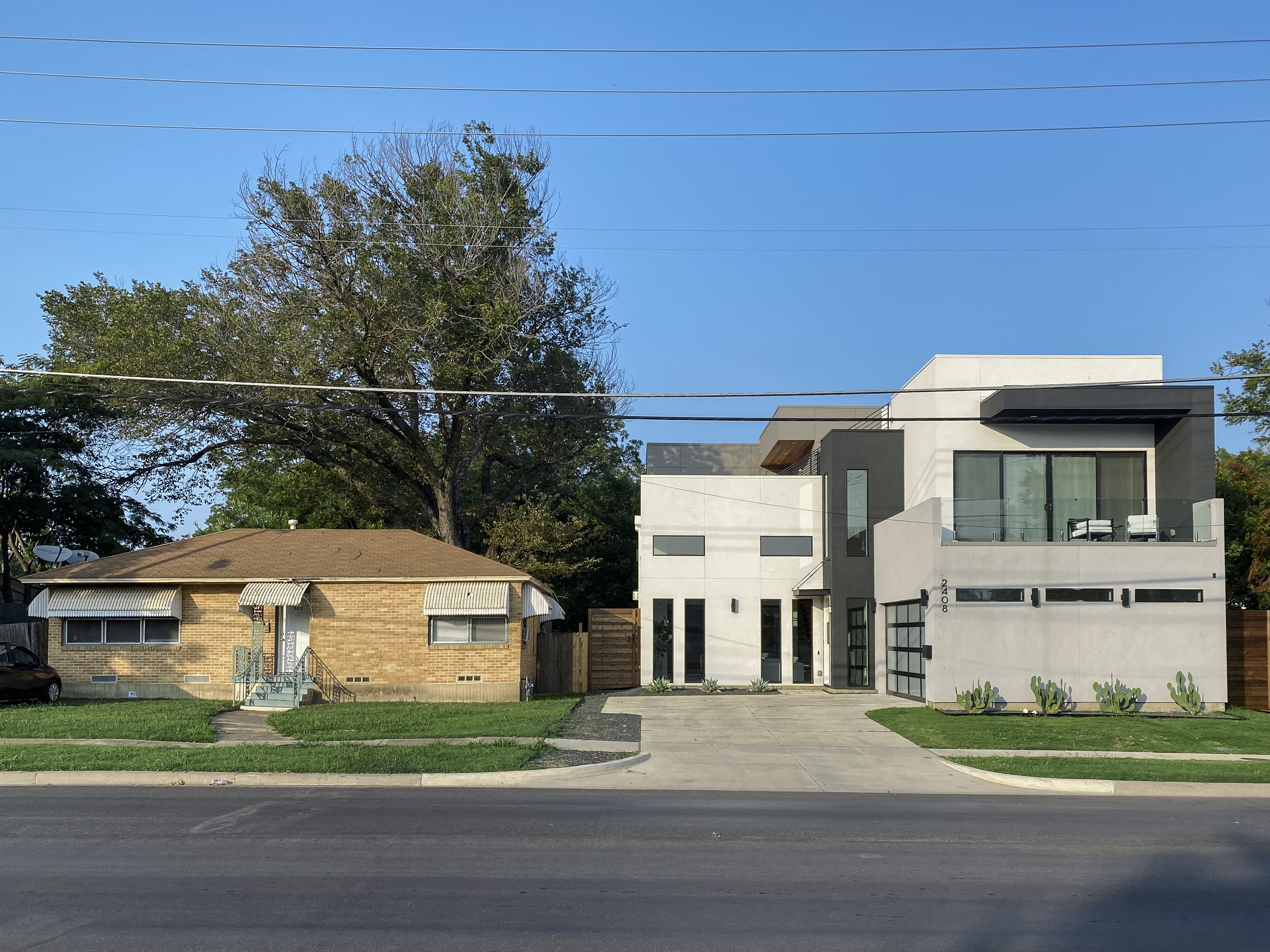
Gentrification with old and new homes side by side in Old East Dallas

The economic changes that occur as a community goes through gentrification are often favorable for local governments. Affluent gentrifiers expand the local tax base as well as support local shops and businesses, a large part of why the process is frequently alluded to in urban policies. The decrease in vacancy rates and increase in property value that accompany the process can work to stabilize a previously struggling community, restoring interest in inner-city life as a residential option alongside the suburbs. These changes can create positive feedback as well, encouraging other forms of development of the area that promote general economic growth.

Home ownership is a significant variable when it comes to economic impacts of gentrification. People who own their homes are much more able to gain financial benefits of gentrification than those who rent their houses and can be displaced without much compensation.

Economic pressure and market price changes relate to the speed of gentrification. English-speaking countries have a higher number of property owners and a higher mobility.

A 2017 study found that gentrification leads to job gains overall, but that there are job losses in proximate locations, but job gains further away. A 2014 study found that gentrification led to job gains in the gentrifying neighborhood.

A 2016 study found that residents who stay in gentrifying neighborhoods go onto obtain higher credit scores whereas residents who leave gentrifying neighborhoods obtain lower credit scores.

=== Health ===
Displacement carries many health implications that contribute to disparities among populations such as the poor, women, children, the elderly, and members of racial/ethnic minority groups. These specific populations are at an increased risk for the negative consequences of gentrification. Studies indicate that vulnerable populations typically have shorter life expectancy; higher cancer rates; more birth defects; greater infant mortality; and higher incidence of asthma, diabetes, and cardiovascular disease. Displacement due to gentrification limits access to or availability to housing affordability, healthy food alternatives, transportation, education institutions, outdoor and green space, exercise facilities, and social networks. Limits to these effects can lead to changes in stress levels, injuries, violence, crime, incarceration rates, mental health, and social and environmental justice. Research found that gentrification leads to job losses by 63% on prior residents, which forces most of them to find work farther from their homes. Careful consideration of zoning, neighborhood design, and affordability is vital to mitigating the impacts of gentrification. A culmination of recent research suggests that gentrification has both detrimental and beneficial effects on health.

Existing literature investigating the relationship between gentrification and health (including physical health, mental health, health-related behaviors, stress, etc.) do not show a consensus on the definition of gentrification. This variation, coupled with gaps in examining social determinants of health and longitudinal studies, makes it difficult to clearly establish the mechanisms associated with gentrification and related factors such as race, socioeconomic status, and age with the health of different populations. However, it is well-supported through published evidence that there are negative impacts of gentrification on health for African Americans and older residents.

Existing residents at risk of displacement in communities undergoing gentrification are often from low-income and minority populations (such as Black and older age residents), placing them at greatest vulnerability for the negative effects of gentrification on health including, and not limited to, lack of access to healthy foods and transportation options and increased risk of pollution and mental health issues. These factors contribute to detrimental long-term health impacts such as a shorter life span, decreased quality of life, and increased chronic illnesses like cancer and cardiovascular disease. In some cases, when residents have protested about poor housing conditions on health, they have been threatened by eviction by landowners.

A 2020 review found that studies tended to show adverse health impacts for Black residents and elderly residents in areas undergoing gentrification.

A 2019 study in New York City, found that gentrification has no impact on rates of asthma or obesity among low-income children. Growing up in gentrifying neighborhoods was associated with moderate increases in being diagnosed with anxiety or depression between ages 9–11 relative to similar children raised in non-gentrifying areas. The effects of gentrification on mental health were most prominent for children living in market-rate (rather than subsidized) housing, which lead the authors of the study to suggest financial stress as a possible mechanism.

=== Voter turnout ===
Gentrified communities see significantly less voter turnout during election years when compared to neighborhoods that are not. During its deep stages, as more wealthy people move into lower-middle-class neighborhoods, the ties to the "old neighborhood" are quickly severed. Areas that are not experiencing extreme forms of gentrification are able to maintain this concept of "old neighborhood" ties that represent the familiarity and culture within a community. The social interaction within neighborhoods helps foster greater voter turnout overall. Those that interact within their community, usually from one neighbor to another, will begin to develop not only a better understanding of the neighborhood around them, but the changes that are necessary to benefit the majority in a neighborhood.

Additionally, displacement of Black residents from historically Black neighborhoods changes the demographics and physical layout of a city. Instead of preserving Black community spaces to exchange dialogue and build community power, gentrification can disperse Black voting power through changing racial demographics and removing physical Black community centers.

=== Public schools ===
"School gentrification" is characterized by: (i) increased numbers of middle-class families; (ii) material and physical upgrades (e.g. new programs, educational resources, and infrastructural improvements); (iii) forms of exclusion and/or the marginalization of low-income students and families (e.g. in both enrollment and social relations); and (iv) changes in school culture and climate (e.g. traditions, expectations, and social dynamics).

Of the urban schools in the U.S. that were eligible for gentrification (that is, located in structurally disinvested neighborhoods) in 2000, approximately 20% experienced gentrification in their surrounding neighborhood by 2010. "In other words, the persistence of disinvestment—not gentrification—remains the modal experience of urban schools located in gentrifiable neighborhoods."

School gentrification does not inevitably accompany residential gentrification, nor does it necessarily entail academic improvements. In Chicago, among neighborhood public schools located in areas that did undergo gentrification, schools were found to experience no aggregate academic benefit from the socioeconomic changes occurring around them, despite improvements in other public services such street repair, sanitation, policing, and firefighting. The lack of gentrification-related benefits to schools may be related to the finding that white gentrifiers often do not enroll their children in local neighborhood public schools.

Programs and policies designed to attract gentrifying families to historically disinvested schools may have unintended negative consequences, including an unbalanced landscape of influence wherein the voices and priorities of more affluent parents are privileged over those of lower-income families. In cases where new higher-income mover are white, there are also lower school enrollment rates. In addition, rising enrollment of higher-income families in neighborhood schools can result in the political and cultural displacement of long-term residents in school decision-making processes and the loss of Title I funding. Notably, the expansion of school choice (e.g., charter schools, magnet schools, open enrollment policies) have been found to significantly increase the likelihood that college-educated white households gentrify low-income communities of color. Additionally, if aggregated data of a school's overall academic performance shows an increase due to the influx of higher-income or more well resourced students, a school may not have the urgency or recognize the need to address the inequities in learning resources and the achievement gap between lower-income and new higher-income students. This may further isolate lower-income students, preventing equitable opportunities and perpetuate negative stereotypes.

== Gentrification of Black neighborhoods ==
Race and ethnicity are often not included or critically examined in discussions of gentrification.

More young, affluent white buyers with higher buying power are entering non-white neighborhoods where existing residents tend to have lower incomes than those buyers. The increase in white buyers moving in changes the economics of the neighborhood, with high income white residents having more financial power and leverage than their Black neighbors. Additionally, the changing demographics may lead to development projects involving the demolition of old homes and community centers, which may erase the historical landscape and culture of a neighborhood.

In Oakland, a historically Black city in the San Francisco Bay Area, gentrification has led to issues of racial profiling and police reports on existing Black residents from their non-Black neighbors. Reports include noise complaints of Black cultural music, causing concerns among residents of cultural suppression and erasure of community roots.

A study conducted on Black Brooklyn explores the complex ties between racial segregation and gentrification. Historically, racial segregation of Black and Latino residents in Black Brooklyn starting from the 1940s was caused by redlining, neighborhood defense (formal and informal processes enforcing racial inequity such as discriminatory housing and banking practices, attacks against minority residents, etc.), public housing developments, and blockbusting. This resulted in minority neighborhoods with insufficient municipal services and inadequate housing. In the 1970s, shifts in demographics of Black low-income communities were due to gentrification by Black middle-income residents who experienced racially biased policies and practices in other neighborhoods and wanted to live in a historically Black community. Gentrification of these neighborhoods by white residents began in the 1990s, leading to some believing that racial integration was being achieved by gentrification. However, declines in segregation were small, and neighborhoods remained largely segregated while long-term low-income residents and Black residents suffered from displacement and other negative effects of gentrification.

Another study, conducted on gentrification of low-income Black communities by middle-income Black movers in Philadelphia, discussed this trend as evidence of the desire of middle-income Black residents in rebuilding, supporting, and preserving Black neighborhoods. The goal of these changes are in improving neighborhood status and the built environment to support and live with existing low-income residents of the community. However, these efforts are limited due to racial and power dynamics in the city. Data shows that displacement of low-income Black residents does not result from Black gentrification, as compared to other types of gentrification.

== Measurement ==
Whether gentrification has occurred in a census tract in an urban area in the United States during a particular 10-year period between censuses can be determined by a method used in a study by Governing: If the census tract in a central city had 500 or more residents and at the time of the baseline census had median household income and median home value in the bottom 40th percentile and at the time of the next 10-year census the tract's educational attainment (percentage of residents over age 25 with a bachelor's degree) was in the top 33rd percentile; the median home value, adjusted for inflation, had increased; and the percentage of increase in home values in the tract was in the top 33rd percentile when compared to the increase in other census tracts in the urban area then it was considered to have been gentrified. The method measures the rate of gentrification, not the degree of gentrification; thus, San Francisco, which has a history of gentrification dating to the 1970s, show a decreasing rate between 1990 and 2010.

Scholars have also identified census indicators that can be used to reveal that gentrification is taking place in a given area, including a drop in the number of children per household, increased education among residents, the number of non-traditional types of households, and a general upwards shift in income.

== Equitable development and policy considerations ==
=== Community benefits agreements ===
Community benefit agreements (CBA) are legally binding, enforceable contracts between a community and a developer or city. CBAs allow existing residents to work with developers to ensure that development projects meet community needs and to prevent displacement and gentrification. Community benefit agreements engage and empower residents, changing power dynamics to include the community as an important stakeholder in decision-making.

=== Asset-based community development ===
An asset-based community development (ABCD) framework is a sustainable, strengths focused approach which centers around building community power, supporting low-income residents, and highlighting a positive view of the community. It contrasts as an alternative to a needs-based approach, which first recognizes the issues of a community rather than its assets. A drawback to the needs-based approach is that, by pointing to all the issues that affect a low-income community, the deficit-oriented perspective that is created may disempower a community and minimize efforts towards sustainable development driven by the community. To prevent these issues, the asset-based community development model is used to identify assets, such as human and social capital, that can be leveraged to support community organizing efforts and empower residents to be a part of the development process.

== Examples ==
=== Atlanta ===
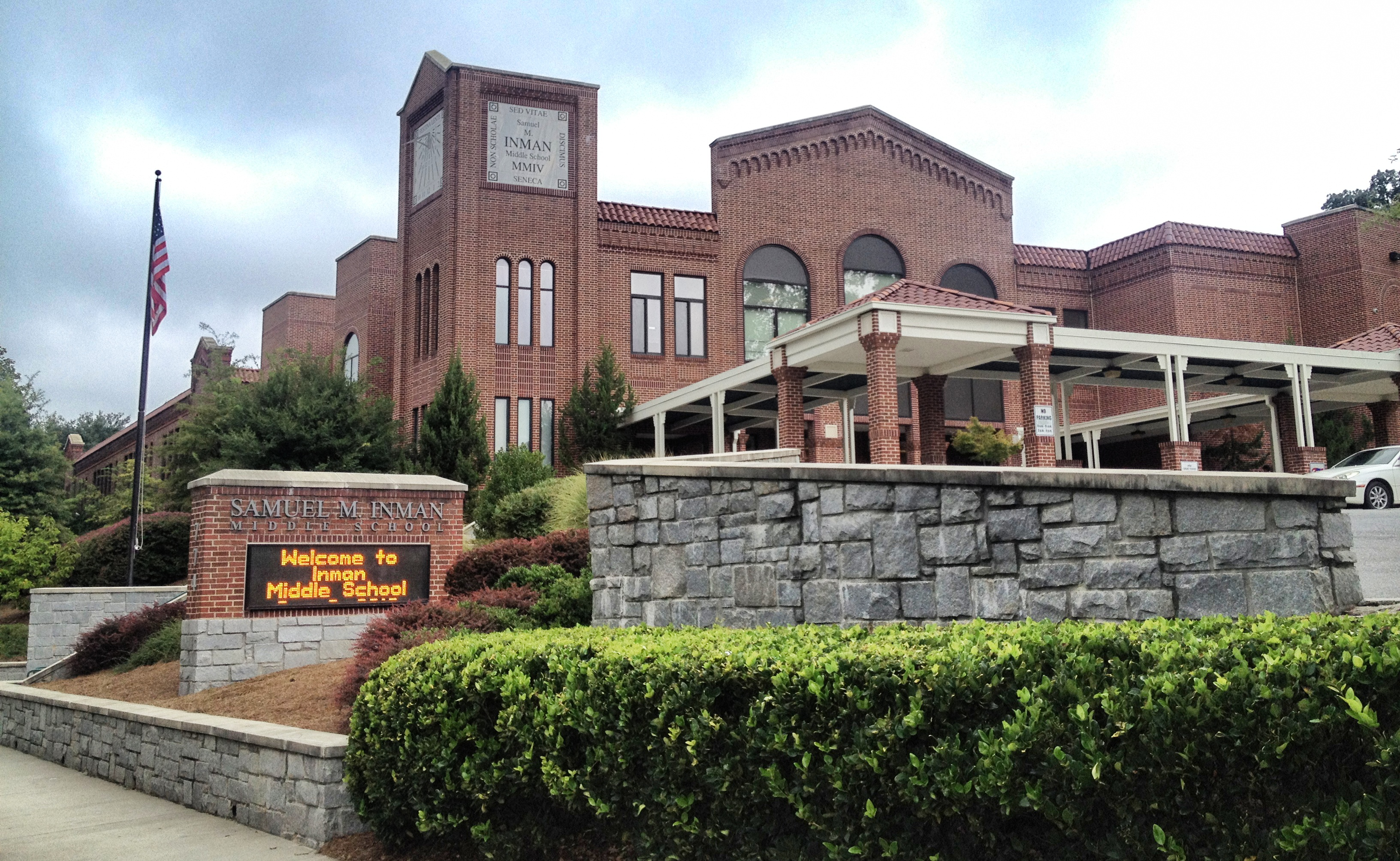
Inman Middle School in Virginia-Highland, Atlanta

Gentrification in Atlanta has been taking place in its inner-city neighborhoods since the 1970s. Many of Atlanta's neighborhoods experienced the urban flight that affected other major American cities in the 20th century, causing the decline of once upper and upper-middle-class city neighborhoods. In the 1970s, after neighborhood opposition blocked two freeways from being built through the east side, its neighborhoods such as Inman Park and Virginia-Highland became the starting point for the city's gentrification wave, first becoming affordable neighborhoods attracting young people, and by 2000 having become relatively affluent areas attracting people from across Metro Atlanta to their upscale shops and restaurants.

In the 1990s and 2000s, gentrification expanded into other parts of Atlanta, spreading throughout the historic streetcar suburbs east of Downtown and Midtown, mostly areas that had long had Black majorities such as the Old Fourth Ward, Kirkwood, Reynoldstown and Edgewood. On the western side of the city, once-industrial West Midtown became a vibrant neighborhood full of residential lofts and a nexus of the arts, restaurants, and home furnishings. Gentrification by Black professionals was most notable in the northwest and southwest Atlanta neighborhoods. However, the non-Black population is growing notably fast in northwest and southwest Atlanta as well. Atlanta landlords not being required to accept Section 8 housing vouchers due to state laws along with further construction of the BeltLine trail is expected to fuel more gentrification and needed improvement in neighborhoods within the city limits.

=== Boston ===
The city of Boston has seen several neighborhoods undergo significant periods of urban renewal, specifically during the 1960s to the 1980s. Called "turbo-gentrification" by sociologist Alan Wolfe, particular areas of study of the process have been done in South End, Bay Village, and West Cambridge. In Boston's North End, the removal of the noisy Central Artery elevated highway attracted younger, more affluent new residents, in place of the traditional Italian immigrant culture.

==== South End ====
In the early 1960s, Boston's South End had a great many characteristics of a neighborhood that is prime for gentrification. The available housing was architecturally sound and unique row houses in a location with high accessibility to urban transport services, while surrounded by small squares and parks. A majority of the area had also been designated a National Historic District.

The South End became deteriorated by the 1960s. Many of the row houses had been converted to cheap apartments, and the neighborhood was plagued by dominant, visible poverty. The majority of the residents were working-class individuals and families with a significant need for public housing and other social services. The situation was recognized by local governments as unfavorable, and in 1960 became the target of an urban renewal effort of the city.

The construction of the Prudential Tower complex that was finished in 1964 along the northwest border of South End was a spark for this urban-renewal effort and the gentrification process for the area that surrounded it. The complex increased job availability in the area, and the cheap housing stock of South End began to attract a new wave of residents. The next 15 years saw an influx of predominantly affluent, young professionals who purchased and renovated houses in South End. Unfortunately, tension characterized the relationship between these new residents and the previous residents of the neighborhood. Clashes in the vision for the area's future was the main source of conflict. The previous, poorer residents, contended that "renewal" should focus on bettering the plight of South End's poor, while new, middle-class residents heavily favored private market investment opportunities and shunned efforts such as subsidized housing with the belief that they would flood the market and raise personal security concerns.

==== Bay Village ====
The late 1940s was a transition for the area from primarily families with children as residents to a population dominated by both retired residents and transient renters. The 2–3 story brick row houses were largely converted to low-cost lodging houses, and the neighborhood came to be described as "blighted" and "down at heel". This deterioration was largely blamed on the transient population.

The year 1957 began the upgrading of what was to become Bay Village, and these changes were mainly attributed to new artists and gay men moving to the area. These "marginal" gentrifiers made significant efforts towards superficial beautification as well as rehabilitation of their new homes, setting the stage for realtors to promote the rising value of the area.

Of the homebuyers in Bay Village from 1957 to 1975, 92% had careers as white-collar professionals. 42% of these homebuyers were 25–34 years old. The majority of them were highly educated and moving from a previous residence in the city, suggesting ties to an urban-based educational institution. The reasons new homebuyers gave for their choice of residence in Bay Village was largely attributed to its proximity to downtown, as well as an appreciation for city life over that of suburbia (Pattison 1977).

==== West Cambridge ====
The development and gentrification of West Cambridge began in 1960 as the resident population began to shift away from the traditional majority of working class Irish immigrants. The period of 1960–1975 had large shifts in homebuyer demographics comparable to that experienced by Bay Village. Professional occupations were overrepresented in homebuyers during this 15-year period, as well as the age group of 25–34 years old. Residents reported a visible lack of social ties between new homebuyers and the original residents. However, displacement was not cited as a problem because the primary reason of housing sale remained the death of the sole-surviving member of the household or the death of a spouse.

Researcher Timothy Pattison divided the gentrification process of West Cambridge into two main stages. Stage one began with various architects and architectural students who were attracted to the affordability of the neighborhood. The renovations efforts these "marginal" gentrifiers undertook seemed to spark a new interest in the area, perhaps as word of the cheap land spread to the wider student community.

The Peabody Schools also served as an enticing factor for the new gentrifiers for both stages of new homebuyers. Stage two of the process brought more architects to the area as well as non-architect professionals, often employed at a university institution. The buyers in stage two cited Peabody schools and the socioeconomic mix of the neighborhood as primary reasons for their residential choice, as well as a desire to avoid job commutes and a disenchantment with the suburban life.

=== California ===
California's strong economic growth produced demand for high-skilled workers, and combined with its severe housing shortage, has resulted in a net inflow of highly educated, high-income workers and a net outflow of less educated, lower-income workers thereby gentrifying the entire state.

=== Chicago ===
Chicago's gentrification rate was reported to be 16.8% in 2015. But researchers have claimed that it has had a significant on specific urban neighborhoods and led to destabilization of black and Latino communities and their shared cultural identity. Gentrification and Community Fabric in Chicago, by John Betancur, discusses the effects of gentrification on displaced residents in five different neighborhoods in Chicago, focusing solely on not only racial minorities but those of a racial minority who are also of a financial minority. This article concludes that the experiences of low-income Latinos in these five neighborhoods were significantly worse than those of European ethnicity and others displaced, illustrated by the continued displacement of Latinos due to gentrification as they tried to settle down but were forced out time and time again. There are several other consequences that occur as a result of gentrification, including but not limited to a loss of culture and the displacement of crime to surrounding areas. In addition, the loss of culture directly affects small businesses as corporate businesses take over with gentrification. On the other hand, other research has found that black and Latino neighborhoods in Chicago are actually gentrified less often than whiter neighborhoods. This article synthesizes their findings by portraying this as a disadvantage for low-income minorities, claiming that the lack of gentrification in their neighborhood keeps them on a declining trajectory of wealth, furthering the wealth gap in Chicago and preventing them from any "benefits" that gentrification could give them.

=== Philadelphia: Darian Street ===
Gentrification Amid Urban Decline: Strategies for America's Older Cities, by Michael Lang, reports the process and impact (social, economic, cultural) of gentrification. In particular, it focuses on the section of Darien Street (a north–south street running intermittently from South to North Philadelphia) which is essentially an alley in the populous Bella Vista neighborhood. That part of Darien Street was a "back street", because it does not connect to any of the city's main arteries and was unpaved for most of its existence.

In its early days, this area of Darien Street housed only Italian families; however, after the Second World War (1939–1945), when the municipal government spoke of building a cross-town highway, the families moved out. Most of the houses date from 1885 (built for the artisans and craftsmen who worked and lived in the area), but, when the Italian Americans moved out, the community's low-rent houses went to poor African American families. Moreover, by the early 1970s, blighted Darien Street was at its lowest point as a community, because the houses held little property value, many were abandoned, having broken heaters and collapsed roofs, et cetera. Furthermore, the houses were very small — approximately 15 feet (4.6 m) wide and 15 feet (4.6 m) deep, each had three one-room stories (locally known, and still currently advertised as a "Trinity" style house) and the largest yard was 8 feet (2.4 m) deep. Despite the decay, Darien Street remained charmed with European echoes, each house was architecturally different, contributing to the street's community character; children were safe, there was no car traffic. The closeness of the houses generated a closely knit community located just to the south of Center City, an inexpensive residential neighborhood a short distance from the city-life amenities of Philadelphia; the city government did not hesitate to rehabilitate it.

The gentrification began in 1977; the first house rehabilitated was a corner property that a school teacher re-modeled and occupied. The next years featured (mostly) white middle-class men moving into the abandoned houses; the first displacement of original Darien Street residents occurred in 1979. Two years later, five of seven families had been economically evicted with inflated housing prices; the two remaining families were renters, expecting eventual displacement. In five years, from 1977 to 1982, the gentrification of Darien Street reduced the original population from seven black households and one white household, to two black households and eleven white households. The average rent increased 488 per cent — from $85 to $500 a month; by 1981, a house bought for $5,000 sold for $35,000. Of the five black households displaced, three found better houses within two blocks of their original residence, one family left Pennsylvania, and one family moved into a public housing apartment building five blocks from Darien Street.The benefits of the Darien Street gentrification included increased property tax revenues and better-quality housing. The principal detriment was residential displacement via higher priced housing.

=== Washington, D.C. ===
Gentrification in Washington, D.C. is one of the most studied examples of the process, as well as one of the most extreme. The process in the U Street Corridor and other downtown areas has recently become a major issue, and the resulting changes have led to African Americans dropping from a majority to a minority of the population, as they move out and middle-class whites and Asians have moved in.

Washington is one of the top three cities with the most pronounced capital flow into its "core" neighborhoods, a measurement that has been used to detect areas experiencing gentrification. Researcher Franklin James found that, of these core areas, Capitol Hill was significantly revitalized during the decade of 1960–1970, and by the end of the decade this revitalization had extended outward in a ring around this core area. Gale (1987) studied these "Revitalization Areas," which include the Dupont Circle, Adams Morgan, and Capitol Hill neighborhoods, and as compared to the rest of the city found that these areas were experiencing a faster rate of depopulation in the 1970s than the surrounding areas. U.S. census data show that in the Revitalization Areas, the percentage of the population with four or more years of college education rose from 24% in 1970 to 47% in 1980, as opposed to an increase of 21% to 24% for the remaining areas of Washington. Additionally, Gale's data showed that in 1970, 73% of the residents living in the Revitalization Areas had been residents since 1965; however, in 1975, only 66% of the residents living there had been residents of the area in 1970 as well.

The gentrification during this time period resulted in a significant problem of displacement for marginalized city residents in the 1970s. A decrease in the stock of affordable housing for needy households as well as nonsubsidized housing for low-income workers has had a burdensome effect on individuals and families.

As a result of gentrification, however, Washington's safety has improved drastically. In the early 1990s, the city had an average of 500 homicides a year; by 2012, the rate had dropped by more than 80% to about 100 before again seeing a 54% spike in 2015 over 2014. Many of the city's poorer residents were pushed out to adjacent Prince George's County, Maryland and further south to Charles County, Maryland. Prince George's County saw a huge spark of violent crimes in 2008 and 2009, but the rate has decreased since then.

=== San Francisco Bay Area ===
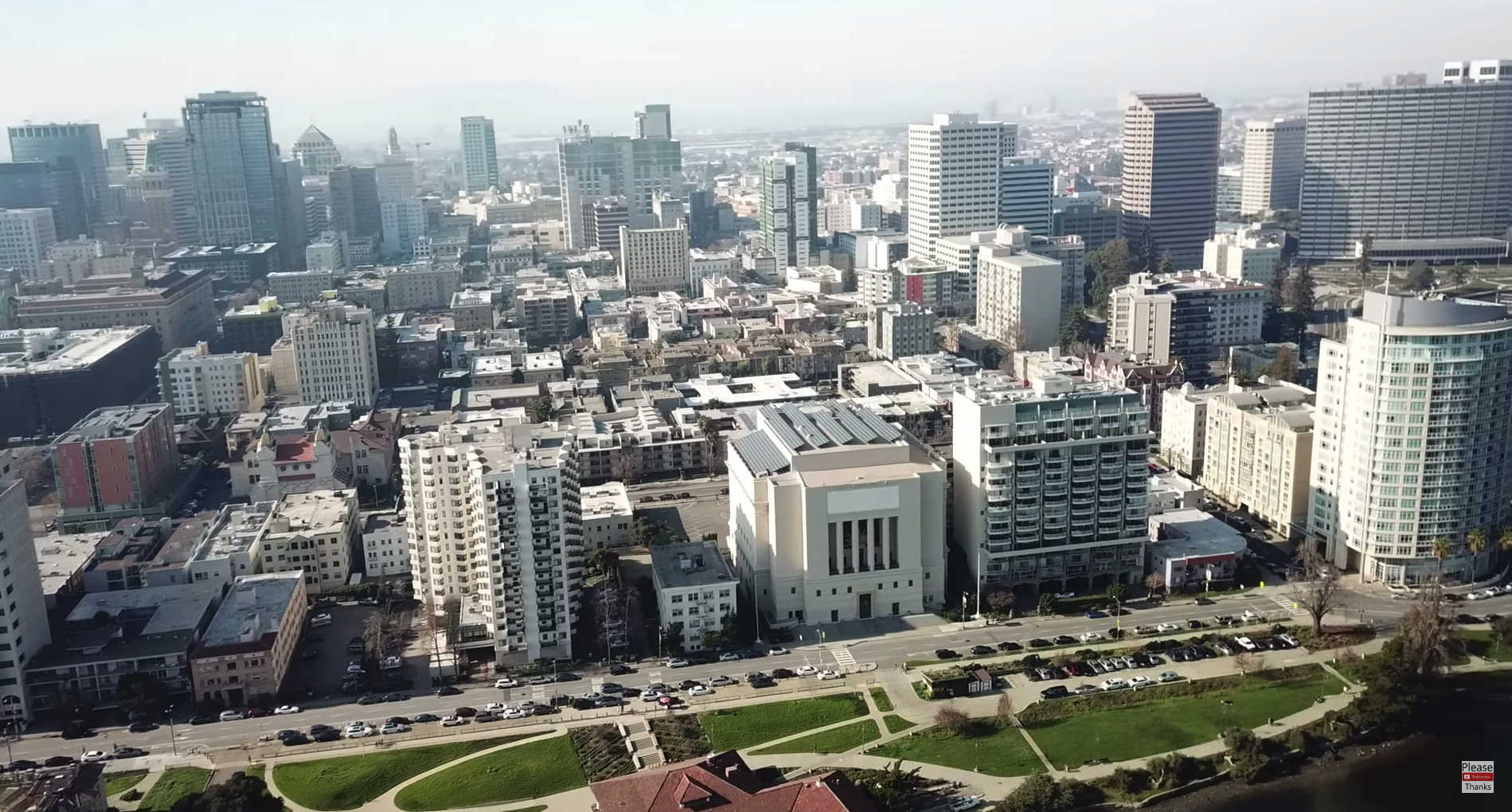
Oakland, California

A major driver of gentrification in Bay Area cities such as San Francisco has been attributed to the Dot-Com Boom in the 1990s, creating a strong demand for skilled tech workers from local startups and nearby Silicon Valley businesses leading to rising standards of living. Private shuttle buses operated by companies such as Google have driven up rents in areas near their stops, leading to some protests. As a result, a large influx of new workers in the internet and technology sector began contributing to the gentrification of historically poor immigrant neighborhoods such as the Mission District. During this time San Francisco began a transformation, eventually culminating in it becoming the most expensive city in which to live in the United States.

From 1990 to 2010, 18,000 African Americans left San Francisco, while the White, Asian, and Hispanic populations saw growth in the city. From 2010 to 2014, the number of households making $100,000 grew while households making less than $100,000 declined. According to the American Community Survey, during this same period an average of 60,000 people both migrated to San Francisco and migrated out. The people who left the city were more likely to be nonwhite, have lower education levels, and have lower incomes than their counterparts who moved into the city. In addition, there was a net annual migration of 7,500 people age 35 or under, and net out migration of over 5,000 for people 36 or over.

In Oakland, a city historically tied to their Black community identity, has seen significant decreases in its Black resident population as Black residents are systemically displaced, evicted, or forced to leave from Oakland. This trend can be attributed to the effects of redlining, police brutality on Black residents, loss of affordable housing, among other systemic factors, which have all perpetuated financial inequality, racial discrimination, and segregation.

=== New York City ===
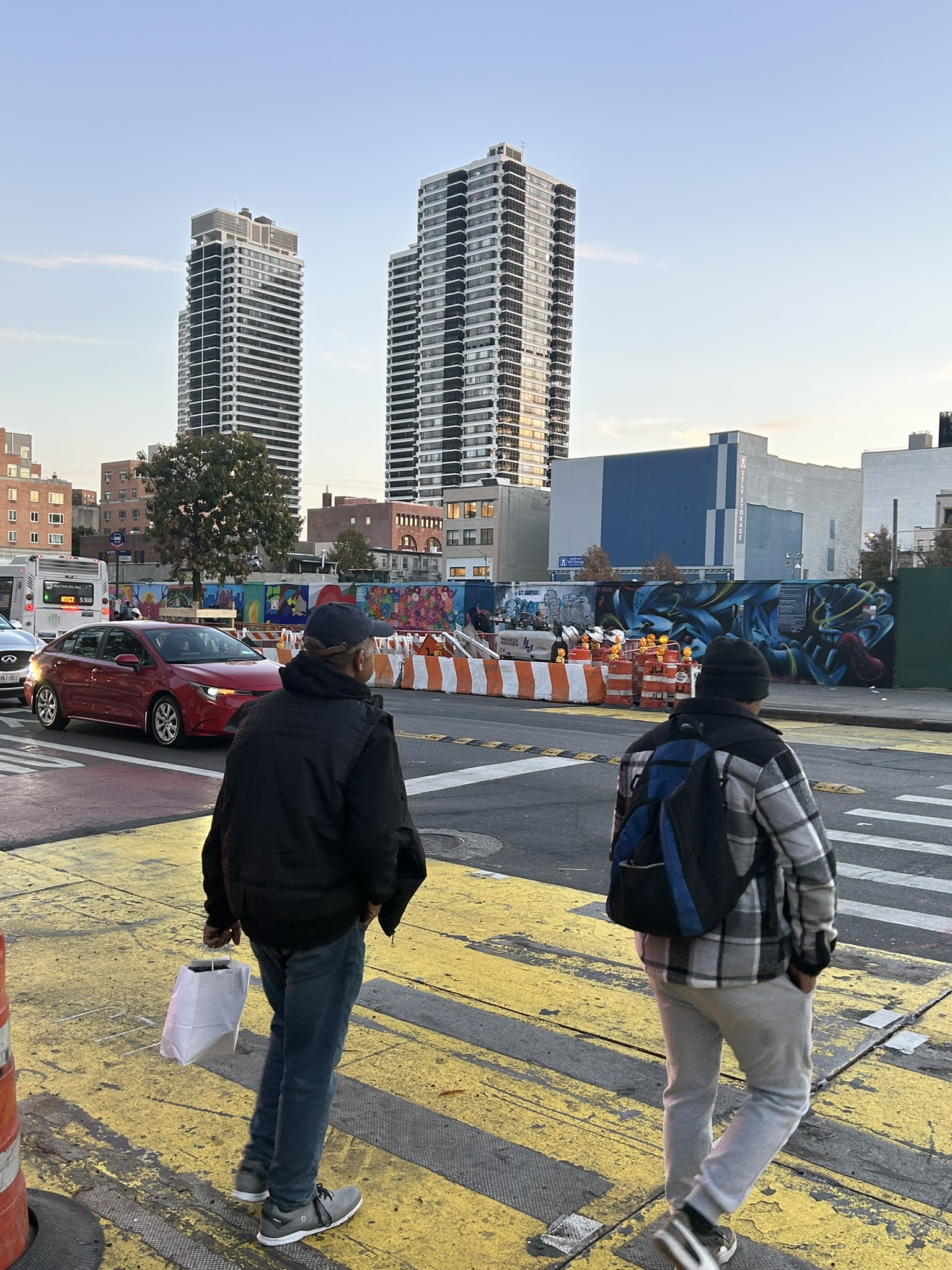
New skyscraper in East Harlem, NYC

In one of the first instances of the term "gentrification" being applied to a U.S. city, a 1979 article states "A renaissance in New York City? The rich moving in and the poor moving out? ... Hard as it is to believe, however, New York and other cities in the American Northeast are beginning to enjoy a revival as they undergo a gradual process known by the curious name of 'gentrification' term coined by the displaced English poor and subsequently adopted by urban experts to describe the movements of social classes in and around London."

In a 2017 review of the book Vanishing New York: How a Great City Lost Its Soul, a New York Times writer stated that "bemoaning the changes that have plagued New York in recent years — the proliferation of $20 million apartments, the banks now on every corner visualizing the centrality of money to the city's consciousness, the substitution of culinary virtue for a broader civic morality — has been an avocation for many people living in and around Manhattan for well over a decade."

New York City is a common example of gentrification, especially when it comes to discussions about rising rents and low-income residents moving out. In 2004, Lance Freeman and Frank Braconi of Columbia University found that low-income residents are actually less likely to move out of a neighborhood that had the "typical hallmarks" of gentrification than one that did not.

The onset of AIDS in the LGBTQ+ community was a determining factor in the rapid gentrification of many homes and communities in many different neighborhoods of Manhattan. Because of how widespread the disease was, many homes and apartments were left unoccupied after the tenants died, leaving room for gentrification to occur.

=== Detroit ===
Gentrification in Detroit differs from most cities in that relatively few residents have been physically displaced, as large amounts of vacant land and housing are available for development. For example, as of 2015, 23 percent of Detroit's housing units were vacant, and this figure does not include the copious amounts of vacant land in the city on which new housing units could be built. Such property is regularly (sometimes tens of thousands of properties in a single year) sold at auction for prices as low as $500 following foreclosure for tax delinquency, and thus available for development in large amounts. Some scholars, such as john a. powell (spelled without capitals), even go so far as to claim that what is happening in Detroit is not gentrification, but rather "in-fill housing". His reasoning points out that building new structures or revitalizing abandoned housing is not pushing out existing residents and is hence not "gentrification".

While physical displacement is minimal, the cultural displacement in Detroit is immense. This displacement falls largely upon the shoulders of the low-income African American community to shoulder. Residents who have lived in Detroit for decades have built a strong sense of community, belonging, and historical connection to the city. Despite the corruption and injustice that forced many African Americans to live in some of the worst conditions within city, the black community was still able to build a rich community and strong sense of pride for living in Detroit. When individuals are displaced, they not only lose their home, but also their sense of belonging. Those that are left behind also experience drastic and harrowing changes to their neighborhood. 2013 interviews with Detroit residents revealed that many felt excluded from increasingly white and wealthy areas of the city. For example, some black residents were prohibited from utilizing a community garden, owned by a white individual, in Midtown, a gentrifying area of the city.

Like gentrification in many other American cities, gentrification in Detroit is racially correlated. As average wages in the Greater Downtown area grew from 2002 to 2011, the percentage of the white population in that area increased, while the percentage of the black population fell. This disparity is partly due to Detroit's history of inequality. After World War II and its subsequent economic boom, economic inequality became commonplace. African Americans were often the ones to bear the brunt of this inequality. Discriminatory housing policies, such as restrictive covenants, were put into place by white residents who wanted to prevent racial integration. In effect, the black community, already limited by unjust economic policies, were forced to stay in impoverished and segregated neighborhoods. Continued segregation and limitations to economic change for the African American community meant that they remained at the mercy of the white powers, even to this day. When black individuals finally had the opportunity to expand their housing outside the inner city and into "white" neighborhoods in the late 1950s, many white families moved out. The majority black population that was left in Detroit were forced to live with the subsequent problems that followed mass decreases in the city's population.

=== Houston ===
Freedman's Town, Houston

Compared to other large metropolitan cities in Texas, such as Dallas and Austin, Houston has been most rapidly gentrifying, leading to issues such as unaffordable housing and displacement of long-term existing residents. Freedman's Town, a neighborhood founded by freed Black people, after the enforcement of the Emancipation Proclamation, has historically been known as a community of Black professionals and a thriving center for Black culture and opportunity in Houston. However, as new developments were built within and surrounding the community, community residents were displaced and the geographical makeup of the area was changed (from the development of a new highway though the neighborhood and building demolition for new housing projects). Private land in Freedman's Town was also taken away from Black residents under the government's ability exercise eminent domain. Adding on the effect of Jim Crow laws, the neighborhood faced significant oppression and marginalization. Despite these changes and displacement, community ties to Freedman Town remain strong, with community groups working together to preserve their neighborhood and cultural identity. With new residents who come to Freedman's Town, some have joined the existing residents in their community coalitions to support historic preservation, while other new residents have created their own coalitions in opposition. Issues of individuals with Freedman's town involve concerns with crime and illegal activity in the neighborhood; however, when interviewing community residents, it is evident that those issues are largely due to individuals and groups outside of the community, who come in and taint the neighborhood's reputation with their actions. Because of these negative stereotypes, some use what is portrayed in media as justification for viewing the historic Freedman's Town as one that is not worth preserving, which fails to recognize the strength and value in protecting the neighborhood's culture and dangerously hides the issues of race, poverty, and systemic barriers that need to be addressed.

Other Black neighborhoods in Houston, including Third Ward and Fifth Ward are currently experiencing the effects of gentrification as city developments such as the South Main Innovation District are being built. In these communities, historic preservation is a priority and tool to prevent the cultural erasure and other negative effects of gentrification. Additionally, to address issues such as lack of affordable housing, economic opportunities, and cultural preservation, community coalitions of residents in Third Ward are working on creating an enforceable Community Benefits Agreement between developers and the community to ensure that the community is able to be part of development negotiations.

== Bibliography ==
- Belanger, Helene (2012). "The meaning of the built environment during gentrification in Canada". Journal of Housing and the Built Environment. 27 (1): 31–47. doi:10.1007/s10901-011-9248-3. S2CID 154873842.
- Boyd, Michelle (July 2008). "Defensive development: The role of racial conflict in gentrification". Urban Affairs Review. 43 (6): 751–776. doi:10.1177/1078087407313581. S2CID 154673967.
- Buntin, John (January 14, 2015). "The gentrification myth: It's rare and not as bad for the poor as people think". Slate.com.
- Dobson, Cory Gregory (2007). Can gentrification be stopped? A case study of Grandview-Woodland, Vancouver (Masters thesis). University of British Columbia. doi:10.14288/1.0100689.
- Florida, Richard (September 8, 2015). "The Complex Relationship Between Gentrification and Displacement". Bloomberg.com.
- Freeman, Lance (2005). "Displacement or Succession? Residential Mobility in Gentrifying Neighborhoods". Urban Affairs Review. 40 (4): 463–491. doi:10.1177/1078087404273341. S2CID 154267676.
- Freeman, Lance (2006). There Goes the 'Hood: Views of Gentrification from the Ground Up. Philadelphia, PA: Temple University. ISBN 978-1-59213-437-3.
- Gale, Dennis E. (1987). Washington, D.C.: Inner-city Revitalization and Minority Suburbanization. Philadelphia: Temple University Press.
- Hackworth, Jason (2002). "Postrecession Gentrification in New York City". Urban Affairs Review. 37 (6): 815–843. doi:10.1177/107874037006003. S2CID 144137542.
- Lang, Michael (1982). Gentrification Amid Urban Decline. Cambridge, MA: Ballinger. ISBN 978-0-88410-697-5.
- Lees, Loretta; Slater, Tom; Wyly, Elvin K., eds. (2010). The Gentrification Reader. London: Routledge. ISBN 978-0-415-54840-3.
- Maloutas, Thomas (2011). "Contextual diversity in gentrification research". Critical Sociology. 38 (1): 33–48. doi:10.1177/0896920510380950. S2CID 145738703.
- Murdie, R.; Teixeira, C. (2009). "The impact of gentrification on ethnic neighbourhoods in Toronto: A case study of Little Portugal" (PDF). Urban Studies. 48 (1): 61–83. doi:10.1177/0042098009360227. PMID 21174893. S2CID 15748911.
- Quastel, Noah (2009). "Political ecologies of gentrification". Urban Geography. 30 (7): 694–725. doi:10.2747/0272-3638.30.7.694. S2CID 143989462.
- Schulman, Sarah (2012). The Gentrification of the Mind: Witness to a Lost Imagination. Berkeley, CA: University of California Press. ISBN 978-0-520-26477-9.
- Smith, Neil; Williams, Peter (1986). Gentrification of the City. Boston: Allen & Unwin. ISBN 978-0-04-301202-4.
- Vandergrift, Janelle (2006). "Gentrification and Displacement" (PDF). Calvin College. Center for Social Research. Archived from the original (PDF) on March 30, 2017.
- Vigdor, Jacob L.; Massey, Douglas S.; Rivlin, Alice M. (2002). "Does Gentrification Harm the Poor? [with Comments]". Brookings-Wharton Papers on Urban Affairs: 133–182. doi:10.1353/urb.2002.0012. JSTOR 25067387. S2CID 155028628.
