= Magazine Beach =

River park in Cambridge, Massachusetts

Coordinates: 42°21′18.1″N 71°06′49.0″W

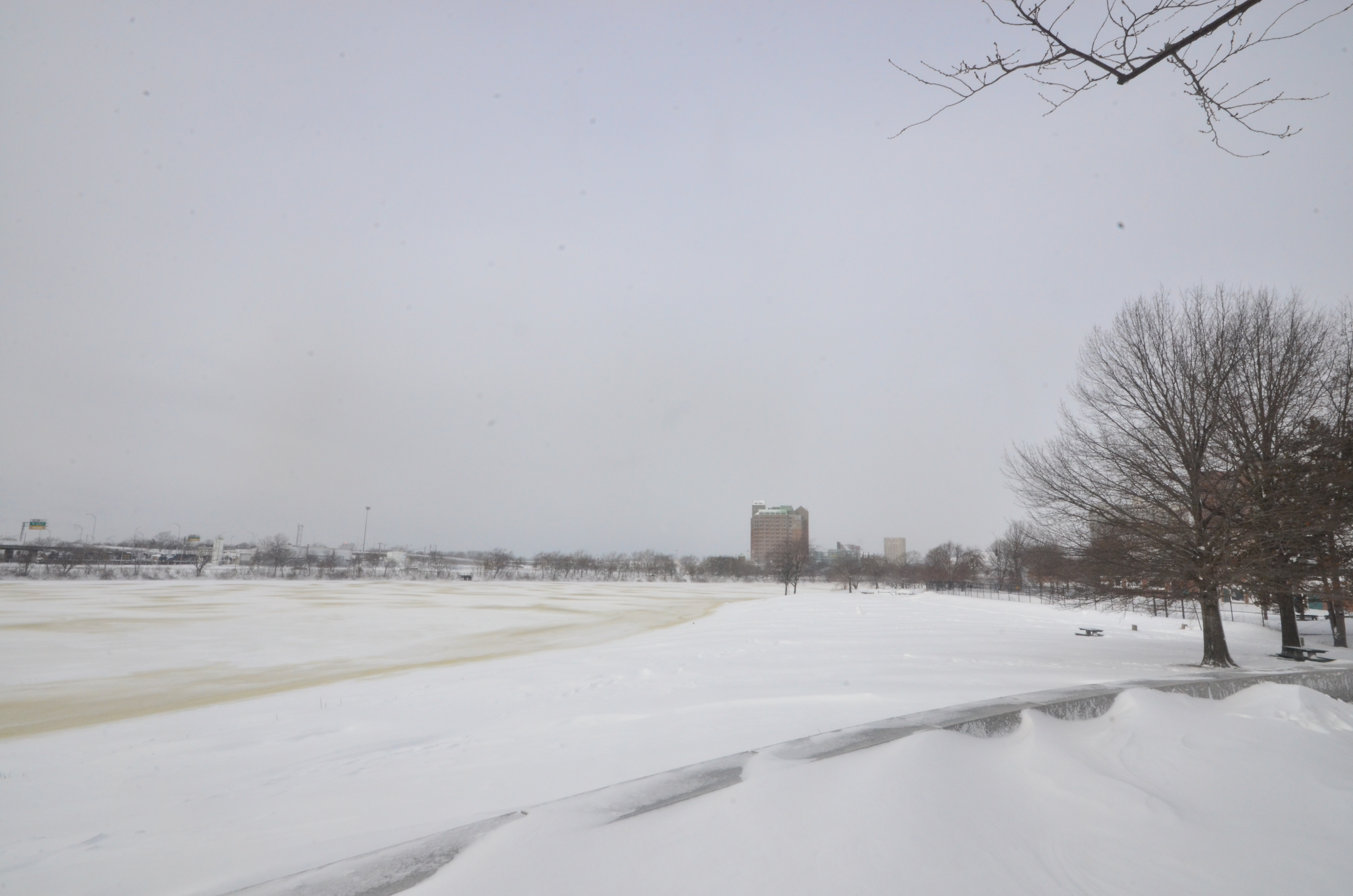
Magazine Beach in winter

Magazine Beach is a riverside park in Cambridge, Massachusetts, United States. It is located on the left bank of the Charles River, across Memorial Drive from Cambridgeport. The other side of the river has Agganis Arena and other Boston University facilities.

Magazine Beach is Cambridge's second largest park, being about 15 acres (6.1 ha) stretching along the river from Pleasant Street to the BU Bridge. The park includes a free outdoor swimming pool (Veteran's Memorial Pool) as well as ball fields, exercise equipment, picnic areas, and other typical urban park features. The Paul Dudley White Bike Path runs through the park.

The park's namesake, a gunpowder magazine from 1818, is in the park. It is the oldest building in the Charles River Reservation.

There was a swimming beach at the park in the early and mid 20th century, attracting about 60,000 swimmers in a season, but swimming in the Charles River became dangerous due to pollution, and was forbidden in 1949.

== History ==
=== Early history ===
In pre-colonial times, the area of what is now Magazine Beach was a wooded estuary.

In the 17th century, the Massachusetts Bay Company granted land and other emoluments to one Captain Daniel Patrick, an English veteran of the Dutch War of Independence, as part of an arrangement whereby Captain Patrick would see to the building of fortifications, training of militia, and other defensive measures. One piece of land conveyed to Patrick was Captain's Island, at the location of what is now Magazine Beach. Captain's Island was a hillock of dry land surrounded by marshes rather than a freestanding island in open water. An unfortified watchpost was probably built on the island.

Sometime before the American Revolution, Captain's Island passed to the ownership of Charles Ward Apthorp, son of Charles Apthorp. Apthorp was a Loyalist, and after the Revolution the island was confiscated and, in 1787, sold at auction, passing to William Whittemore, a grandson of Samuel Whittemore. In 1802, Whittemore sold the island to Francis Dana. In 1818, Dana's heirs sold the island to the Commonwealth of Massachusetts for the construction of a powder magazine. Including the cost of the land purchase, creation of the powderhouse cost US$11,020 (about $231,780 in current dollars).

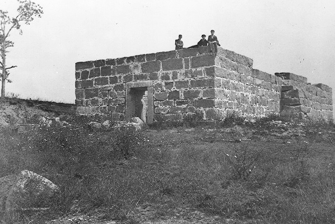
Powderhouse in ruined state, 1890s

By 1863, although still in use, the powderhouse had suffered some decay. In that year, the Commonwealth closed the powderhouse as residential development had crept close, and powderhouses (due to the danger of explosion) were not kept near inhabited areas. In the following decades, the building became a ruin.

=== 20th century ===
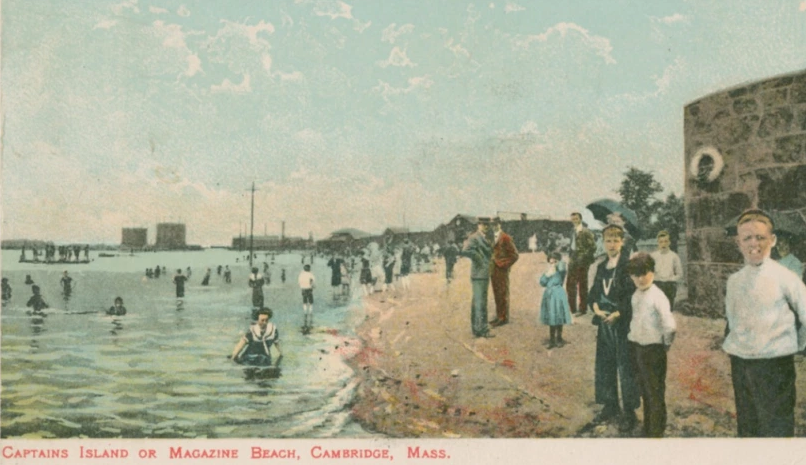
Beachgoers, early 20th century

In the 1890s, public bathing became popular in the United States. In 1894, the City of Cambridge took the land by eminent domain and began converting it to a park. Under the direction of the Olmsted Brothers, marshland was filled in, Captain's Island thus becoming part of the mainland, and the waterfront was graded down to a beach. The old powderhouse was converted to a bathhouse, involving considerable changes to the building. In 1918, the city spent US$3,000 (about $100,090 in current dollars) to renovate the converted powderhouse. From the late 1800s to the mid-1900s, Cambridgeport was a factory area, and the beach was popular with workers (many being immigrants) who lived there.

In 1912, the Riverside Boat Club built its new boathouse upriver of the area on what were then mud flats but is now part of Magazine Beach Park.

in 1921 the land was conveyed to the Massachusetts District Commission, which in 1949 banned swimming in the Charles River. In 1954, the Commission renovated the old powderhouse into a garage and office, which gradually fell into disuse.

The Inner Belt six-lane limited-access highway was planned to pass directly through the area, obliterating Magazine Beach, but the project was canceled in 1971 after intense protests.

=== 21st century ===
In the early 21st century, various upgrades and renovations were made to the park. The park re-opened in the summer of 2020 after being closed for this work. New facilities included a canoe and kayak launch site, a splash deck, and a widened riverside foot path. The gunpowder magazine was rehabilitated. Benches, sitting walls, and a bluestone terrace were built there but (at that time) the interior had not been restored to use nor a decision made on how the building would be used.

An ambitious proposal was made for a park on both banks of the Charles River, including a reclaimed Allston Landing on the opposite bank, connected by footbridges to Magazine Beach Park.
