= Braille trail =

Trail accessible to visually impaired people

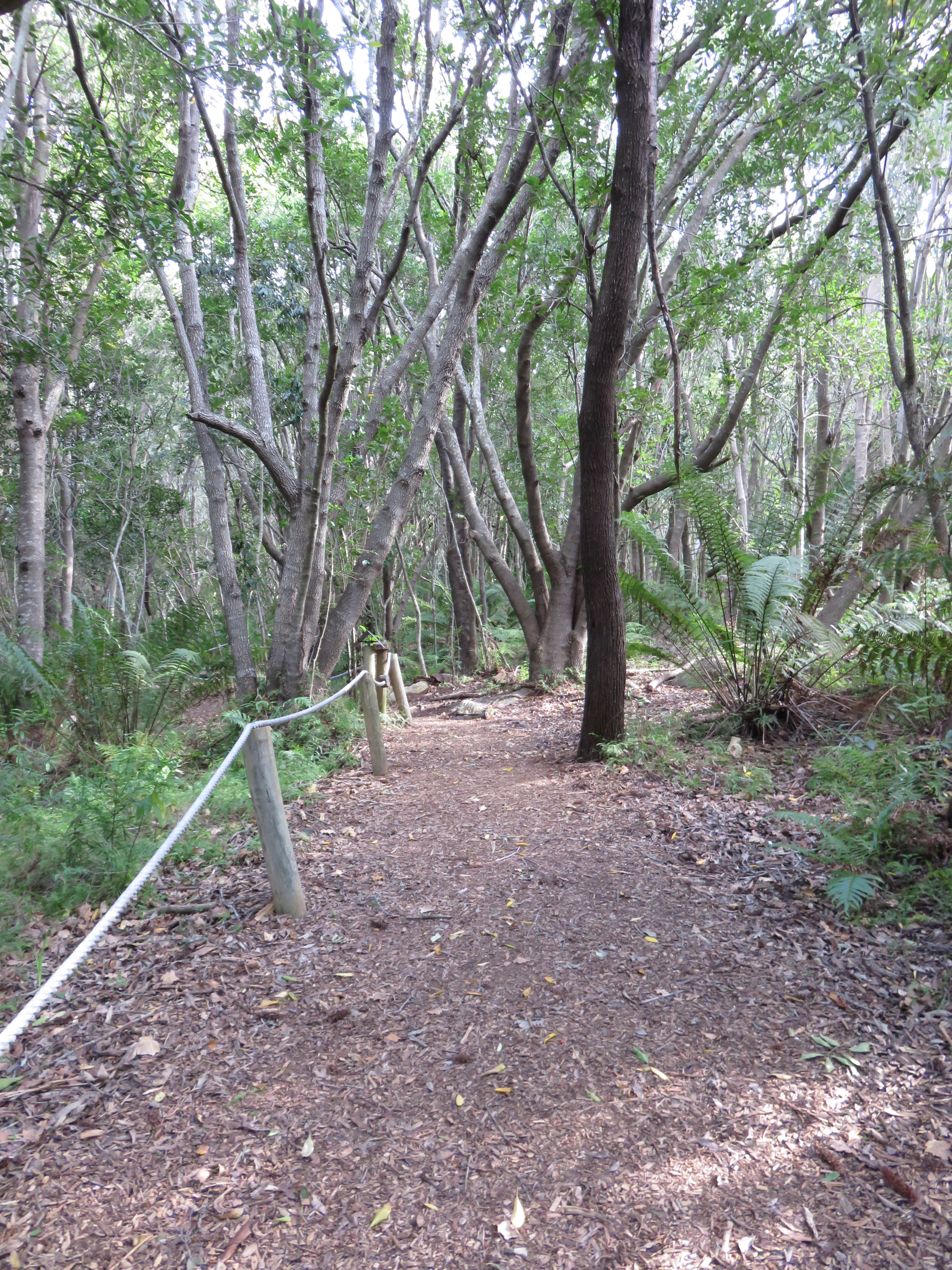
A Braille trail in the Kirstenbosch National Botanical Garden in Cape Town, South Africa

A Braille trail is a walking path or hiking trail that is designed to be accessible by those who are visually impaired. In particular, trails are often delineated with ropes or other physical barriers, and signage and other markers have audio or are written in Braille.

One example is the Watertown Riverfront Park and Braille Trail along the Charles River Reservation in Watertown, Massachusetts, USA, which opened in July 2016. A guide wire runs along the edge of the 1/4 mile (400 metres) path, which borders a sensory park with a variety of features including a wooden boat to climb on and a musical bench.
