= West Cambridge (neighborhood) =

Coordinates: 42°22′40″N 71°7′49″W

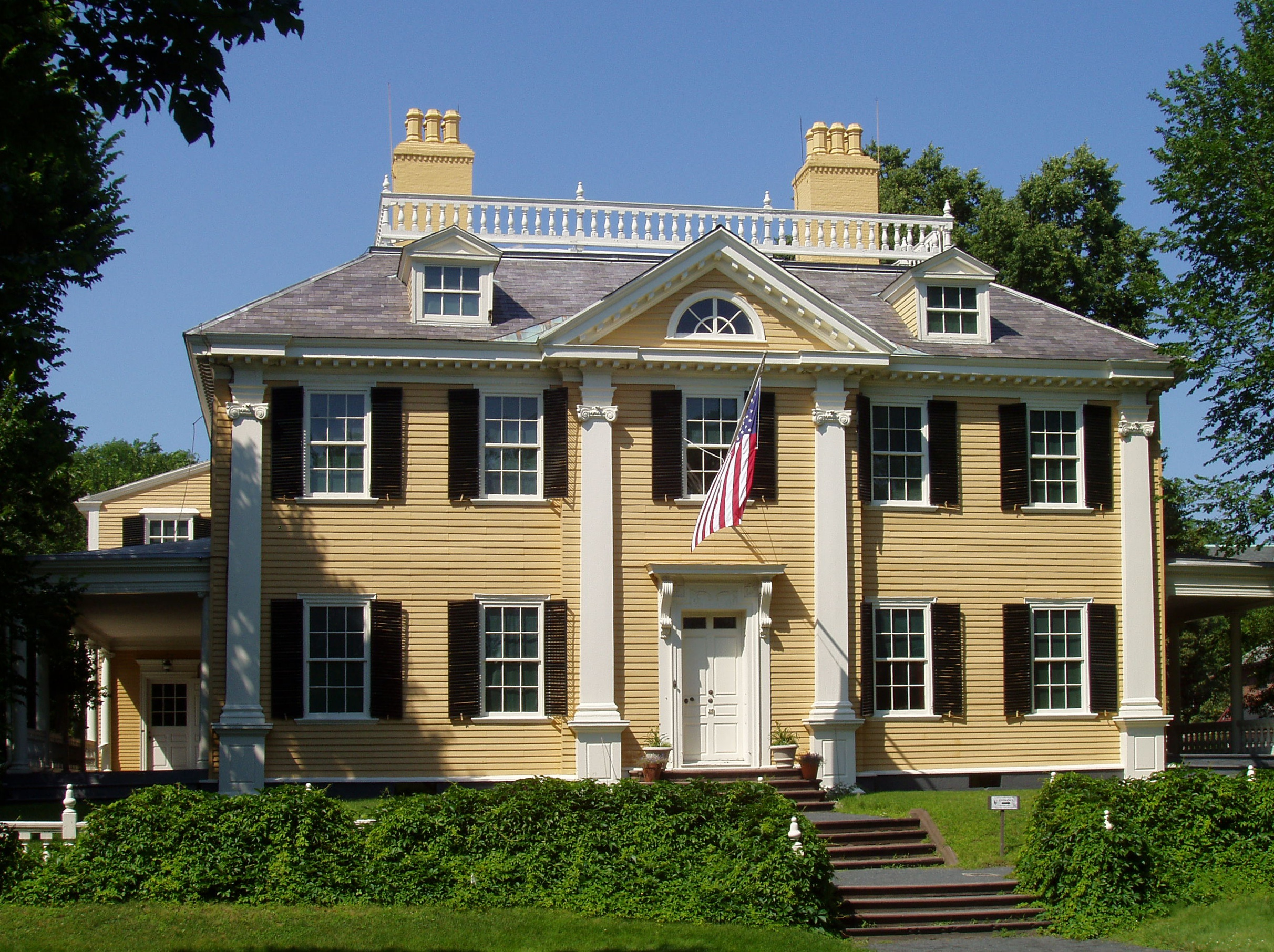
Longfellow House–Washington's Headquarters National Historic Site

West Cambridge, also known as "Area 10", is a neighborhood in Cambridge, Massachusetts. It is bounded by the Charles River on the south, JFK Street on the east, Concord Avenue on the north, and Fresh Pond, Aberdeen Avenue, and the Watertown line on the west.

In 2005 it had a population of 8,266 residents living in 3,887 households, and the average household income was $80,746.

The racial demographics in 2000 were 86.5% White, 5.9% Asian/Pacific Islander, 4.1% Black, 3.7% Hispanic origin, 0.1% Native American, 1.0% other race.

== Prominent features ==
A number of prominent features exist in neighborhood 10. On the southern most end is the Charles River.

=== Parks ===
A collection of parks in neighborhood 10 include portions of the Fresh Pond reservation and its internal prominent highpoint Kingsley Park. A portion of Mount Auburn Cemetery, Cambridge's municipal Cemetery. Callahan Park, John F. Kennedy Park, Lowell Park, Longfellow House Park, Riverbend Park, and Dr. Paul Dudley White Park.

== Transportation ==
Within the West Cambridge neighborhood lies several arterial regional roads including MA-2, MA-2A, MA-16, and US-3. The more prominent roads in the neighborhood including: Brattle Street, Concord Avenue, Fresh Pond Parkway, Huron Avenue, Massachusetts Avenue, Mount Auburn Street, Memorial Drive. On the eastern end is the Harvard Square station busway.

== See also ==
- National Register of Historic Places listings in Cambridge, Massachusetts
