= Cambridgeport, Cambridge, Massachusetts =

Neighborhood of Cambridge, Massachusetts

Coordinates: 42.3600°N 71.1075°W

Cambridgeport
- Location: Cambridge, Massachusetts, US
- Architectural Style: Greek Revival

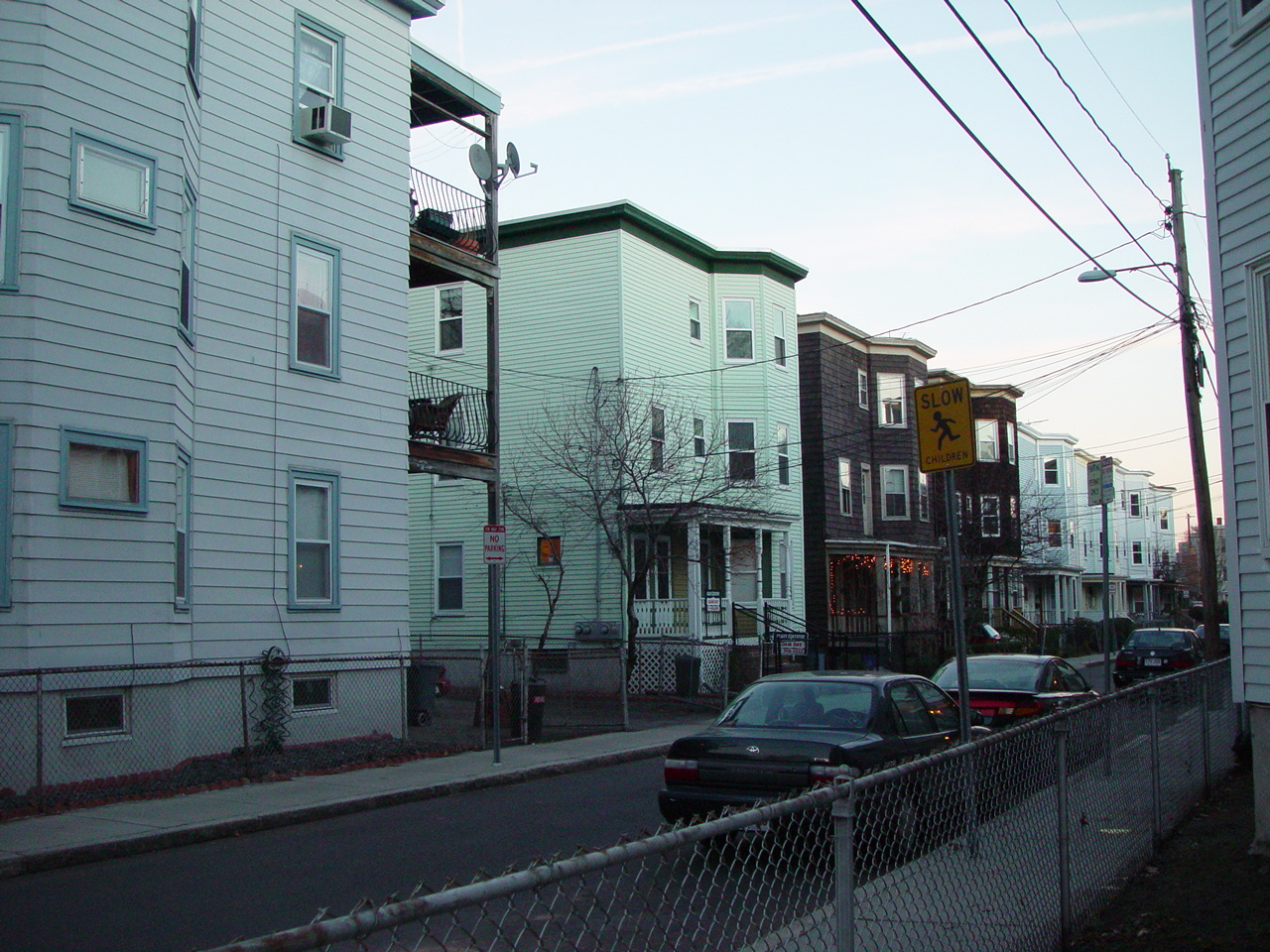
A row of flat-roofed triple deckers in Cambridge, Massachusetts

Cambridgeport is one of the neighborhoods of the city of Cambridge, Massachusetts. It is bounded by Massachusetts Avenue, the Charles River, the Grand Junction Railroad, and River Street.

== Description ==
The neighborhood contains predominantly residential homes, many of the triple decker style common in New England. Central Square, at the northernmost part of Cambridgeport, is an active commercial district and transportation hub, and University Park is a collection of renovated or recently constructed office and apartment buildings. The neighborhood also includes Fort Washington Park, several MIT buildings, and Magazine Beach.

The neighborhood is designated Area 5 by the City of Cambridge.

== History ==
Once part of a more expansive marshland area associated with the Charles River basin, today many of the area's names are associated with its early history. Over time the area has become a center of municipal government for the city.

The Fig Newton cookie (named after nearby Newton, Massachusetts) was first manufactured in Cambridgeport in 1891 at the F. A. Kennedy Steam Bakery.

Portions of the neighborhood would have been demolished as part of the Inner Belt highway project first planned in 1948 but canceled in 1971 after intense protests organized by community activists, and following Gov. Francis Sargent's 1970 moratorium on highway construction inside Route 128. The original plan called for the Interstate to parallel Brookline Street to the Boston University Bridge, although at least one other alignment was also considered.

== Demographics ==
In 2010 the neighborhood had a population of 12,220 residents living in 5,391 households. In 1999, the median household income was $45,294, which has since risen to $86,800 in 2020.

== Education ==
Cambridge Public Schools operates Cambridgeport School, which covers elementary school grades.

The school opened in 1990. In 1997 Mary Lou McGrath, the superintendent, proposed closing Cambridgeport School. The school stayed open, and since circa 2001 it occupies the ex-Fletcher School.
