= Charles River Bike Path =

Bicycle path in Boston, Massachusetts

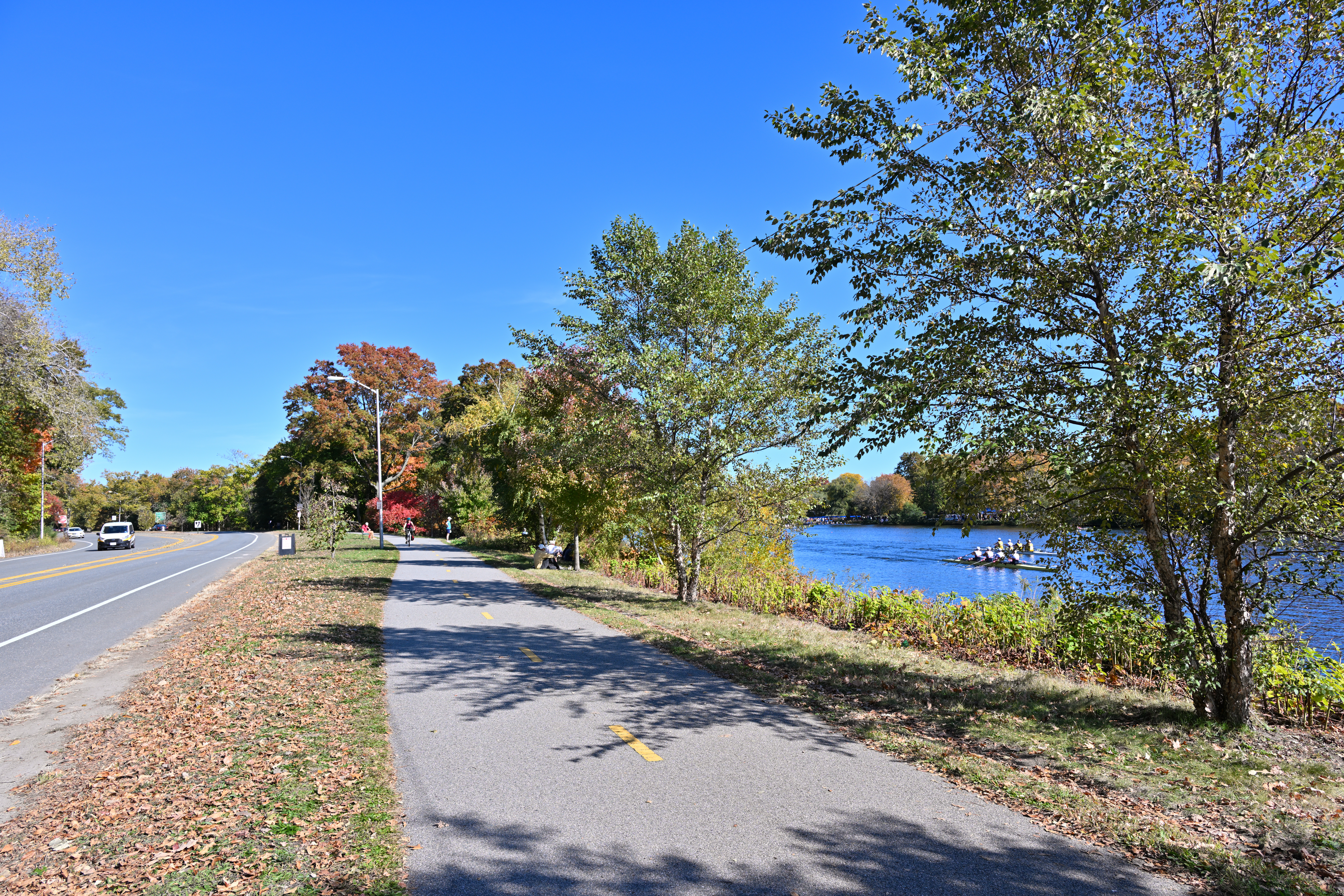
- A section of the Charles River Bike Path in Cambridge
- Length: 23 mi (37 km)
- Location: Boston, Massachusetts to Auburndale, Massachusetts
- Trailheads: Boston Science Museum, Norumbega Park
- Use: Bicycling, inline skating, walking, paddling, rowing
- Difficulty: easy
- Season: year round, some parts not plowed in winter
- Hazards: street crossings, narrow passing
- Maintained by: Department of Conservation and Recreation
- Website: https://www.mass.gov/locations/charles-river-reservation

The Charles River Bike Path is a mixed-use path in the Boston, Massachusetts area. A portion of the trail is named after the cardiologist Paul Dudley White, a prominent advocate of preventive medicine. His research led him to proclaim frequently "I'd like to put everybody on bicycles." In 1955 White served as president Eisenhower's cardiologist and prescribed his famous patient bicycle therapy after his 1955 heart attack.

The path follows both shores of the Charles River from Boston, Massachusetts to Norumbega Park in Newton, passing through Watertown and Waltham. The path consists of several segments in the Charles River Reservation separated by road and bridge crossings and forms part of the planned East Coast Greenway, the 3,000-mile trail system connecting cities from Maine to Florida.

== Charles River Reservation ==
The Paul Dudley White Bicycle Path runs on both sides of the river within the Charles River Reservation. From the Museum of Science on the Charles River Dam Bridge, they run on sidewalk or striped asphalt path to Watertown Square (Galen Street/Route 16 bridge), a loop of 17.1 miles (27.5 km). The paths run along the edge of Cambridge and Watertown on the north; and the West End, Back Bay, and Allston-Brighton neighborhoods of Boston on the south side.

Part of the path will be turned into a river boardwalk as part of the straightening of the Massachusetts Turnpike. The portion between the Longfellow Bridge and Boston University Boathouse on the Cambridge side was rebuilt in 2015-16. In 2019, DCR started soliciting public comments for a planned rebuild on the Cambridge side from the Boston University Bridge to the Eliot Bridge.

== Upper Charles River Reservation ==
In 2004, a $9M master plan to extend the path westward from Watertown Square to Norumbega Park in Newton was completed.

The path continues along the north side of the river from Watertown Square to Bridge Street, there crossing back from Watertown to Newton. This segment was completed in 1997.

The riverwalk then continues along the south bank, crossing back to the north bank at the Blue Heron Bridge, built 2004 just for the path, and continuing to Moody Street in Waltham, near the Charles River Museum of Industry and Waltham Common. The route extends upstream with a combination of paths and streets, to Auburndale, the Newton neighborhood where Norumbega Park is located.

There are plans to extend the path upstream along the curving river to Needham, Dedham, and the West Roxbury neighborhood of Boston.

== Eastern connections ==
Bike recreation opportunities continue to the east with North Point Park in Cambridge, and Nashua Street Park on the Boston side. There are discontinuities near North Station and the Zakim Bridge before the Boston Harborwalk continues on both sides of the harbor.

The Somerville Community Path extension connects the Boston end of the Charles River Path to the network of mixed-use trails to the northwest.

Sequential connections heading north starting at the Watertown Branch Rail Trail, the Watertown-Cambridge Greenway, the Fresh Pond Bikeway, and the Alewife Brook Parkway Path, also connects to the network of mixed-use trails to the northwest.
