= Charles River Reservation =

Park in Massachusetts, United States

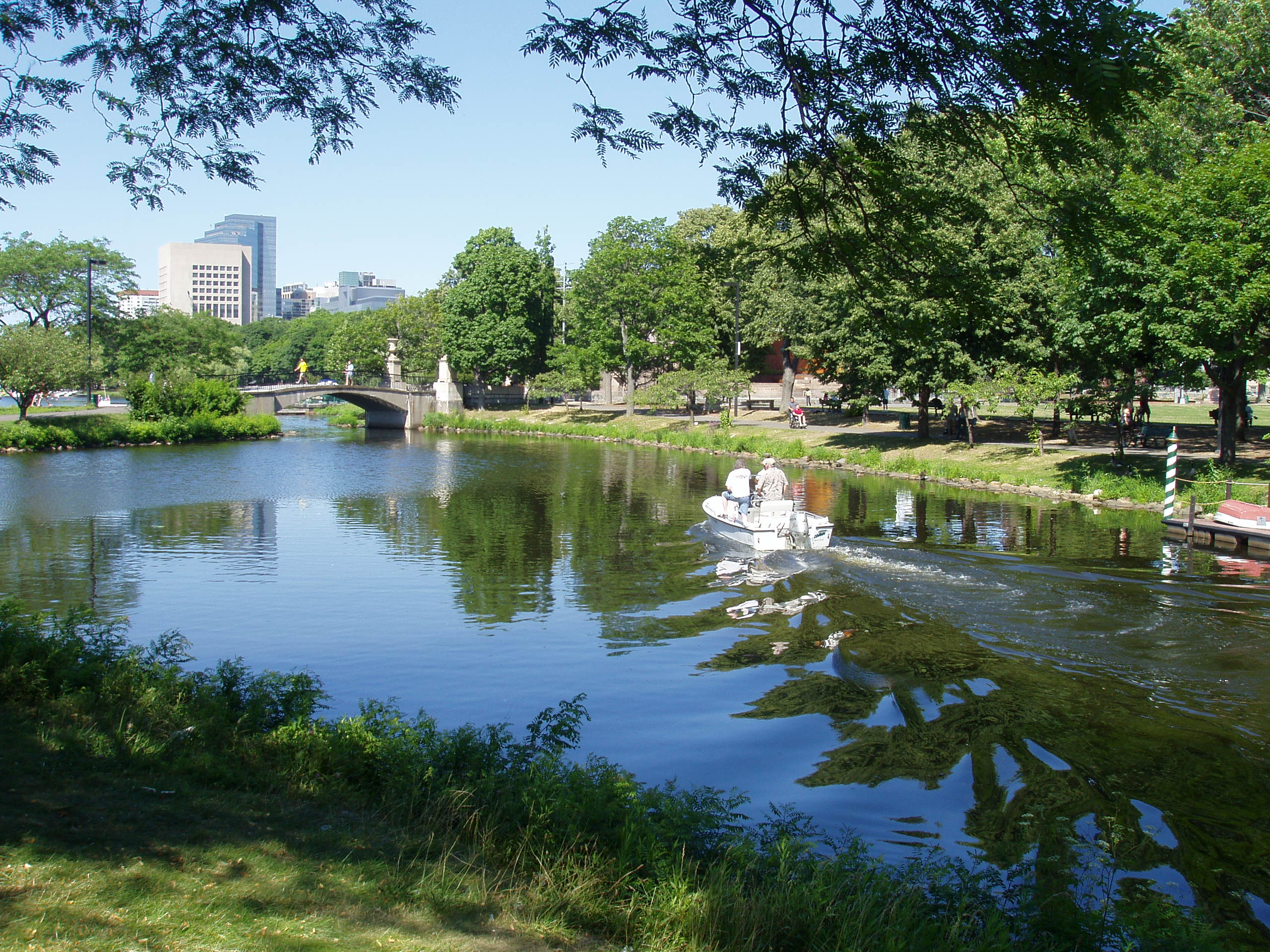
- The Esplanade

- Location within Greater Boston area Location within Massachusetts Location within the United States
- Location: Middlesex County and Suffolk County; Massachusetts, United States
- Coordinates: 42°21′14″N 71°06′43″W
- Area: 863 acres (349 ha)
- Elevation: 10 ft (3.0 m)
- Established: 1910
- Administrator: Massachusetts Department of Conservation and Recreation
- Website: Official website
- Charles River Basin Historic District
- U.S. National Register of Historic Places
- U.S. Historic district
- Location: Both banks of Charles River from Eliot Bridge to Charles River Dam, Cambridge, Massachusetts
- Coordinates: 42°21′09″N 71°06′16″W
- Area: 820 acres (330 ha)
- Built: 1893
- Architect: Multiple
- Architectural style: Colonial Revival, Classical Revival, Moderne
- NRHP reference No.: 78000436
- Added to NRHP: December 22, 1978

Charles River Reservation is a 17-mile-long (27 km) urban preserve and public recreation area located along the banks of the Charles River in Boston, Cambridge, Watertown, and Newton, Massachusetts. The reservation is managed by the Massachusetts Department of Conservation and Recreation. The portion of the reservation between the Charles River Dam and the Eliot Bridge is listed as a historic district on the National Register of Historic Places. This includes the park in the Back Bay neighborhood of Boston known as the Esplanade. The Charles River above the Watertown Dam is managed as the Upper Charles River Reservation.

== Features ==
Features of the reservation include the Charles River Dam, the Charles River Basin, the Boston and Cambridge Esplanades, and John F. Kennedy Park.

=== Charles River Dam ===
The 1978 Charles River Dam, located behind the TD Garden, controls the water level in the river basin. An earlier dam (see Charles River Dam Bridge), located beneath the Museum of Science, was completed in 1910 with the purpose of creating a fresh water river basin and riverfront park in Boston and Cambridge. As part of the dam construction, fill was added between the Longfellow Bridge and Charlesgate and dedicated as the Boston Embankment, now universally known as the Esplanade. The modern dam houses six pumps that provide flood control protection. The dam's lock system permits travel of recreational and commercial vessels from the river to the harbor year round. A fish passage allows for passage of anadromous fish (alewife, rainbow smelt and shad) during the migration season in late spring.

=== Charles River Basin and Esplanades ===
Created in 1910 by damming the formerly tidal river and permanently flooding the tidal marshes and mud flats, the Charles River Basin was designed to provide a "water park" for city dwellers, with access to outstanding river scenery and recreational opportunities on both water and land.

Though entirely designed—and in that sense artificial—the Basin is also a wildlife habitat for hundreds of animal and plant species that play a role in the ecology of the region and enrich the experience of urban park users. Water quality in the once heavily polluted Basin has improved dramatically in recent years, creating better habitat for wildlife and attracting people back to the river.

The character of the Basin changes along this 8.5-mile (13.7 km) stretch, forming three discernible zones: the Lower Basin, from the 1910 Charles River Dam to the Boston University Bridge; the Middle Basin, from the BU Bridge to Herter Park, and the Upper Basin, from Herter Park to the Watertown Dam. The Lower Basin is 2.5 miles (4.0 km) long and up to 2,000 feet (610 m) wide. The panoramas in the Lower Basin define the image of Boston and Cambridge. The Longfellow Bridge is a powerful presence in the Lower Basin, as are the slope of Beacon Hill and the gold dome of the State House. Particular park sections within the reservation, such as Magazine Beach and Herter Park, provide intensely used open space for the bordering urban neighborhoods.

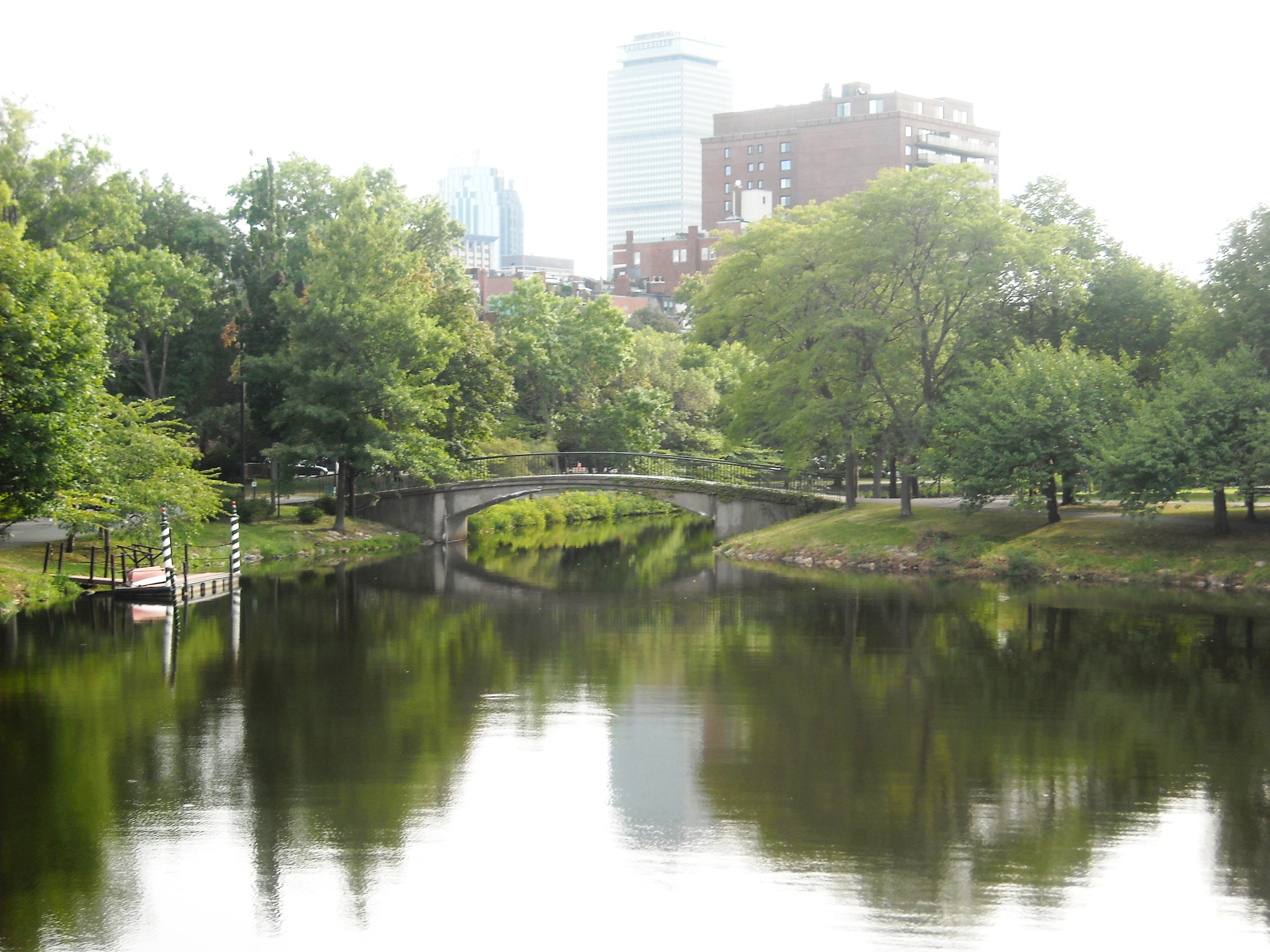
Charlesbank

The Middle Basin is a zone of transition from urban and formal to rural and more natural. Parkways lining the Charles River Basin separate the esplanades in Boston and Cambridge from the nearby neighborhoods. The largest open space is between the Harvard University athletic fields on the south and Mount Auburn and Cambridge cemeteries on the north. Together, these areas form a critical oasis for migrating birds.

Frederick Law Olmsted's 1889 design for Charlesbank created the first public space along the river. It included a promenade along the water's edge, as well as the first public outdoor gymnasiums in the United States, one for women and girls near the Longfellow Bridge and one for men and boys near Leverett Street (now Leverett Circle).

=== John F. Kennedy Park ===
The 5-acre (2.0 ha) John F. Kennedy Park located near Harvard Square is landscaped with plants that bloom at the time of the President's May birthday and a memorial fountain. The park, designed by Carol R. Johnson Associates of Boston, uses materials indigenous to New England including native trees, and the granite fountain and the entrance pillars are inscribed with quotations from the President's speeches.

=== Riverbend Park ===
Riverbend Park extends on the north side of the Charles, from the Eliot Bridge to Western Ave. in Cambridge. In 1974 Isabella Halsted (who lived on Memorial Drive) circulated a letter asking if neighbors would support closing the Drive to vehicles on Sundays from spring to fall. She may have been familiar with the closing of sections of Rock Creek Parkway in Washington, D.C. A portion of the drive was blocked off for the first time the following year. For nine years, the private Trust for Riverbend Park raised funds to cover the cost of the road closing. In 1985 the state legislature authorized and funded the permanent closing of the road from April to November.

== Recreation ==
The reservation's multiple recreational opportunities include cycling on the Charles River Bike Paths, motorized and non-motorized boating, playgrounds, picnicking, swimming pools, tennis courts, ice skating, and concerts at the Hatch Memorial Shell. Sailboat rentals are offered through the non-profit Community Boating, Inc. A quarter mile (400 meter) Braille trail is located in Watertown, near the foot of Irving Street.

== See also ==
- National Register of Historic Places listings in Cambridge, Massachusetts
- National Register of Historic Places listings in northern Boston, Massachusetts
