= Hairenik Weekly =

Hairenik Weekly may refer to one of two publications both published by Hairenik Association in Watertown, Massachusetts:

- Hairenik weekly (Armenian: Հայրենիք), an Armenian-language weekly publication, weekly (1899–2013), twice weekly (1913–1915), daily (1951–1991) and weekly since 1991.
- Hairenik Weekly, an English-language Armenian weekly published 1934 to 1969). Title changed to Armenian Weekly since 1969
