= Gegham Aleksanyan =

Armenian artist (born 1962)

Gegham Aleksanyan (Armenian: Գեղամ Ալեքսանյան; born 1962) is an Armenian artist who has been living and working in the United States since 2004.

== Biography ==
Gegham received his artistic training under Armen Atayan, a former student of renowned artists Martiros Saryan and Alexander Osmerkin. He received his Master of Arts degree from Yerevan State Academy of Fine Arts in 1984 and is a member of the Artists Trade Union of the Russian Federation.

Gegham held his first solo exhibition in the United States in West Hollywood, California in 2005. He has since been the subject of numerous publications and has gained recognition in the United States art scene, including being named a Top 50 Artist by Art Business News in "Counting Down the Artists of Tomorrow Whose Names You Need to Know Today". Several of his paintings were digitally exhibited at Times Square as part of Art Takes Times Square 2012. The prior year, the curatorial team at Artexpo New York recognized Gegham’s "The Last Light" (2000) as Artwork of the Day on March 16, noting: "The female figure, cloaked with heavy garments, seems to carry the weight of the world. She is a symbol of beauty lost in the diversity of projections that civilization has wrapped around her." Gegham has also been the subject of numerous publications in his native country of Armenia prior to moving to the United States.

Gegham's oeuvre merges traditional and modern techniques and themes, expressed seamlessly across various media, offering a distinctive and fresh artistic perspective.

In recent years, Gegham has actively participated in juried exhibitions across the United States, including at "Ingenuity", a juried sculpture and fine crafts exhibition at Marin Society of Artists, held in association with Pacific Rim Sculptors, a chapter of International Sculpture Centre. Gegham also participated in "Art Takes SoHo" and exhibited at Main Street Arts gallery in Clifton Springs, New York.

In 2019, The ArtScope™ exclusively showcased Gegham's art at Art San Diego 2019, where Gegham also contributed to Access to Art, Art San Diego, in partnership with UBS Financial Services to support local arts education, and Gegham participated in a group exhibition in Hawai'i, sponsored by the Hawai'i Island Art Alliance.

In 2024, Gegham participated in Ojai Art Center's 47th annual Art in the Park event.

In 2025, several of Gegham's works were showcased at Mosesian Center for the Arts in Watertown, Massachusetts.

In 2026, several of Gegham's works will be showcased at Mosesian Center for the Arts in Watertown, Massachusetts from September 11, 2026 - November 6, 2026.
