= Watertown Dam =

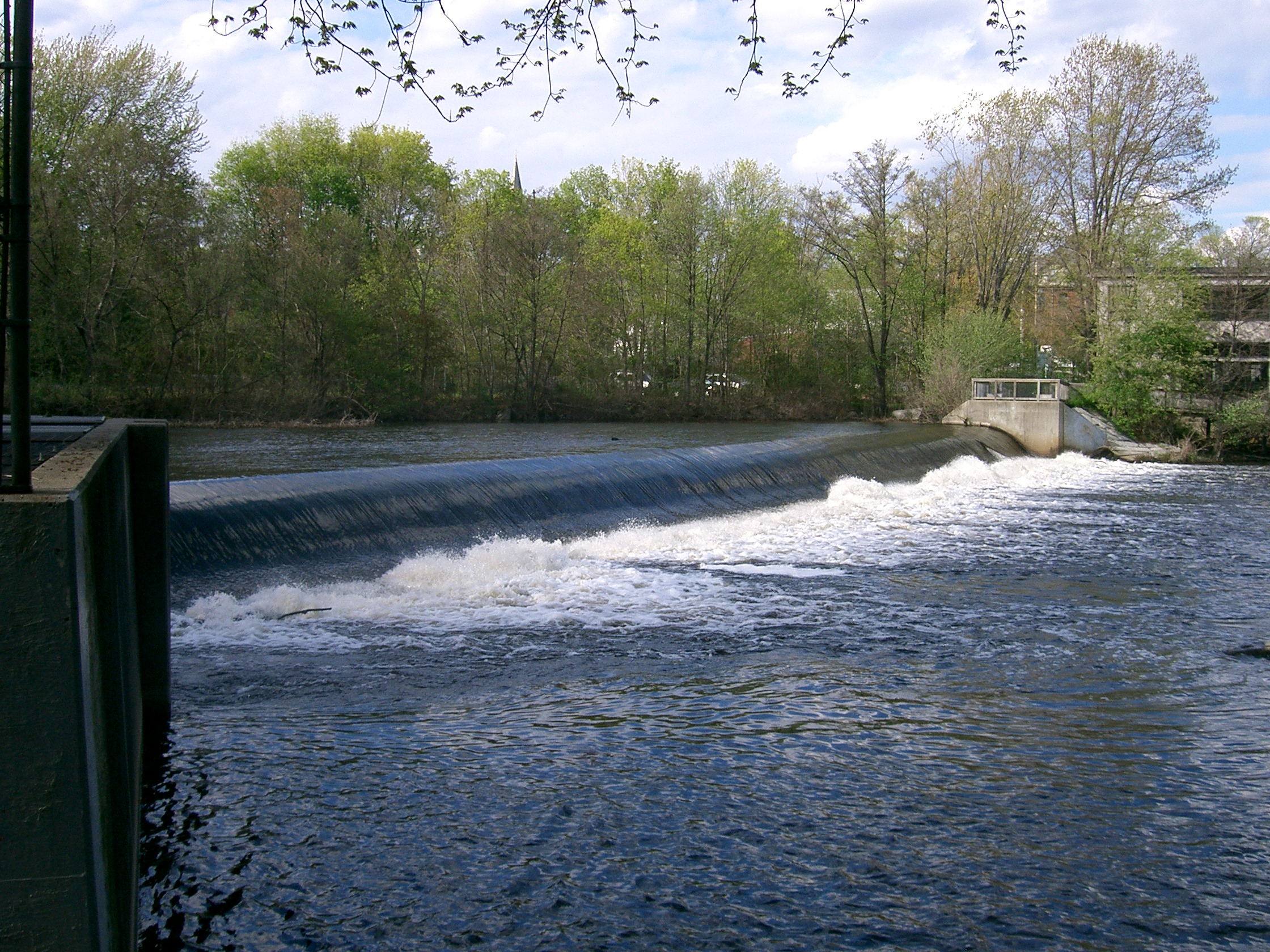
- Watertown Dam from the south bank of the Charles River

- Location within Massachusetts
- Location: Watertown, Massachusetts
- Coordinates: 42°21′55″N 71°11′21″W
- Opening date: 1900
- Operator: Department of Conservation and Recreation (Massachusetts)

Dam and spillways
- Impounds: Charles River
- Length: 220 feet (67 m)

Reservoir
- Total capacity: 30 acre⋅ft (37,000 m^{3})
- Catchment area: 0.2 square miles (0.52 km^{2})

The Watertown Dam spans the Charles River 980 feet (300 m) upstream from the Watertown Bridge near Watertown Square in Watertown, Massachusetts. The dam is located where the Charles River tidal estuary historically ended (the tides no longer reach this point because of the downstream Charles River Dam). Watertown Dam is of concrete construction, a gravity dam, last rebuilt in 1966. Its length is 220 feet (67 m). Its capacity is 30 acre-feet (37,000 m^{3}). Normal storage is 20 acre-feet (25,000 m^{3}). It drains an area of 0.2 square miles (0.52 km^{2}).

The history of the dam traces back to 1632 when construction of a fish weir was authorized. The current dam, maintained by the Department of Conservation and Recreation, dates from 1900. It is part of the Upper Charles River Reservation.

== Ecological impact ==
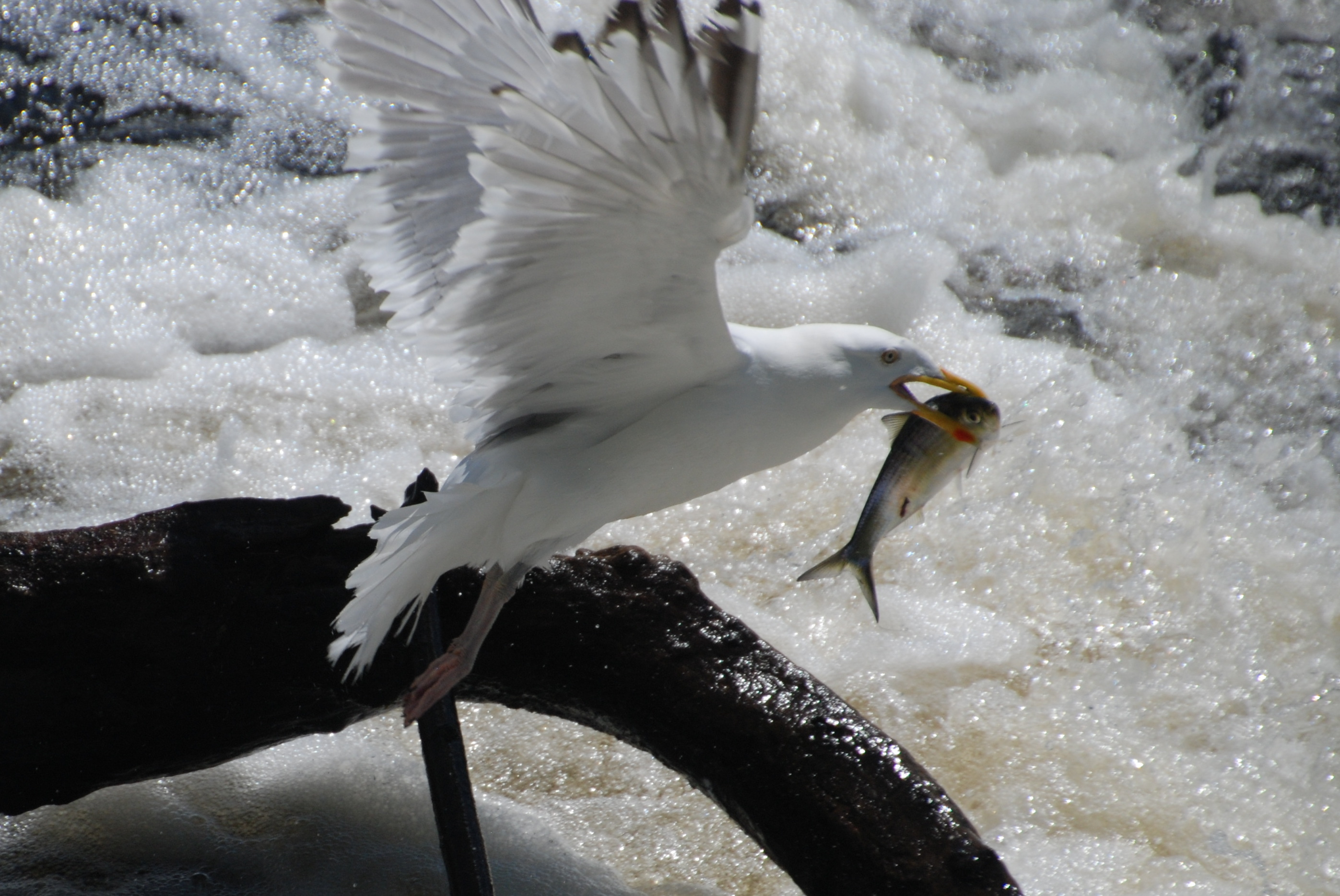
Herring gull with herring caught below the Watertown Dam

The Watertown Dam is the second of numerous dams located along the length of the Charles River. The current dam creates an obstacle for the river herring that run in the spring, but herring have long been harvested at this site. The Pequossette (one of the tribes of the Massachusett people) inserted stakes into the river then interwove brushwood to create a weir that would trap the herring as the tide went out.

Today, a fish ladder provides access to upstream spawning habitat as part of a system of fish passages that provide access up to river mile 20. The high concentrations of blueback herring and alewife below the dam in the spring make it a popular fishing spot for herring gulls, great black-backed gulls, great blue herons, night herons and cormorants.

Great blue heron fishing for herring below the Watertown Dam

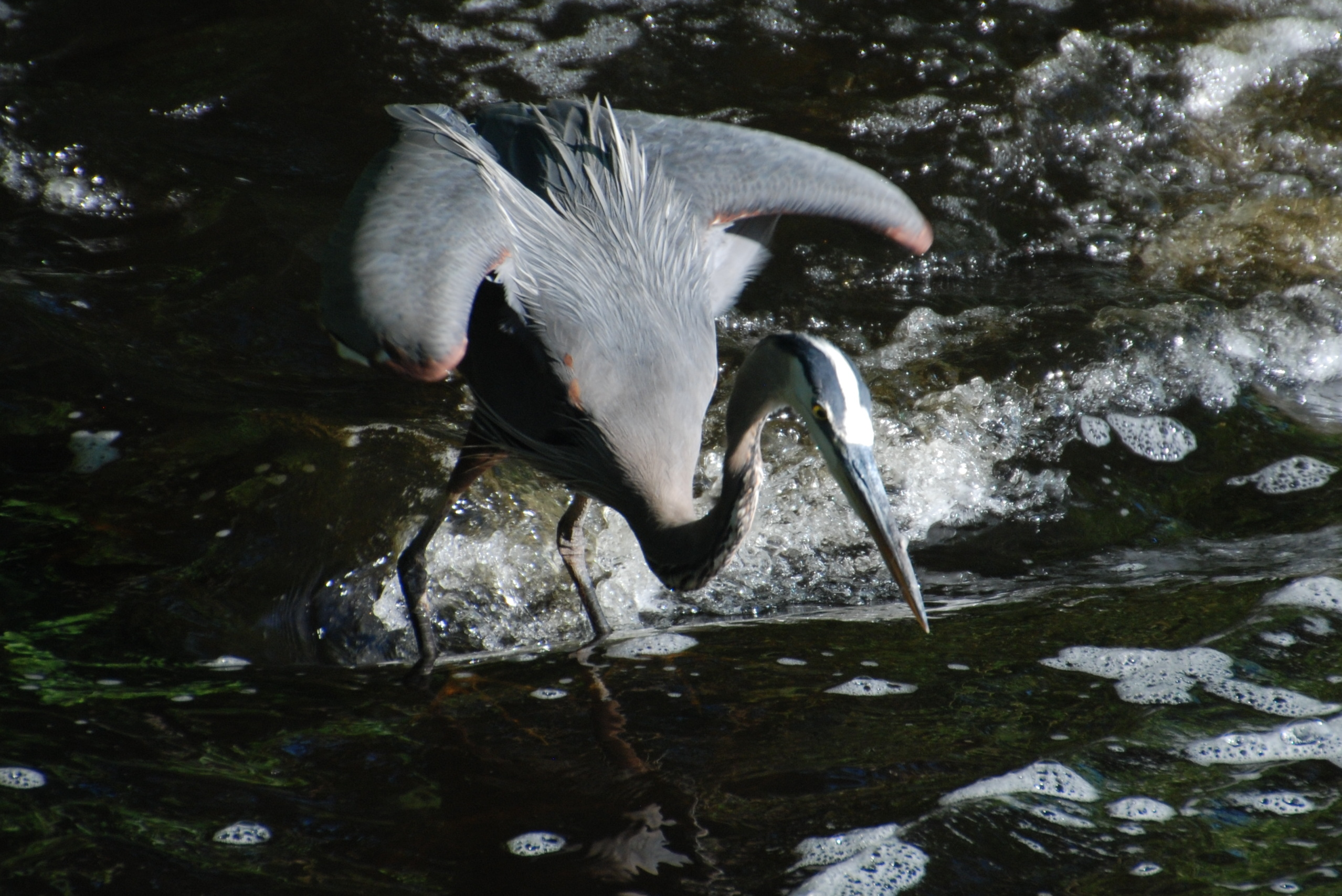
Readying to strike

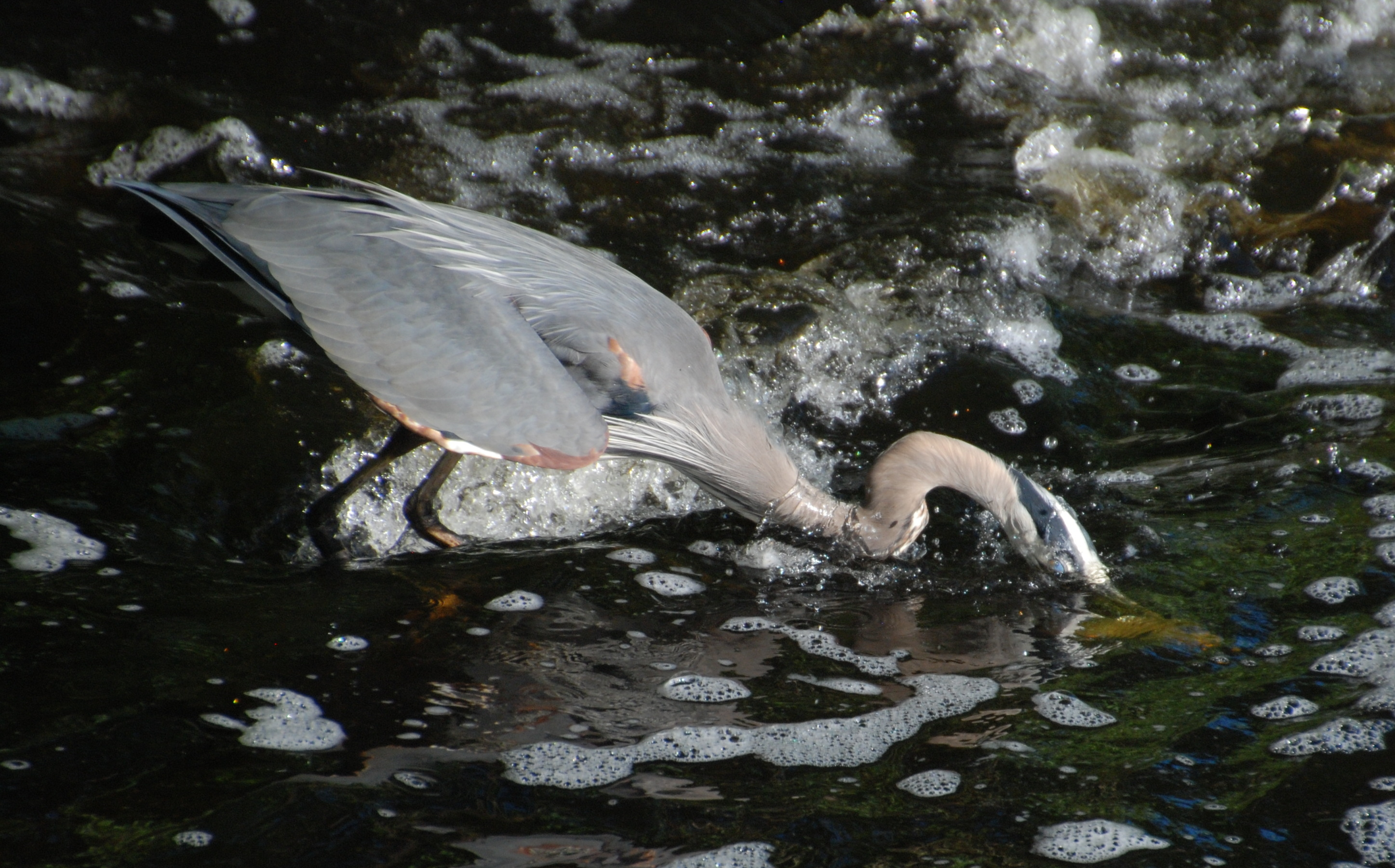
Heron has fish under water

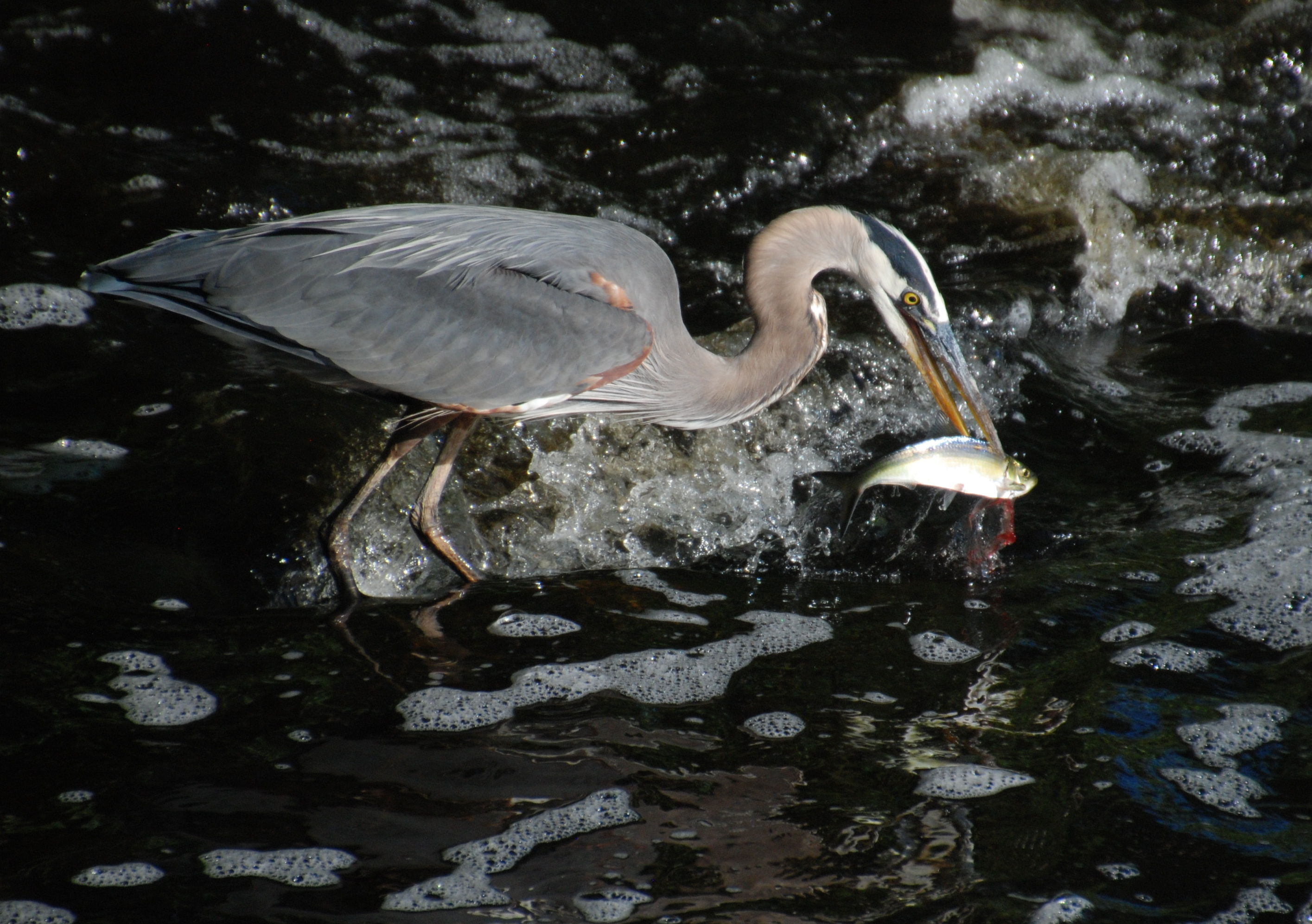
Successfully speared

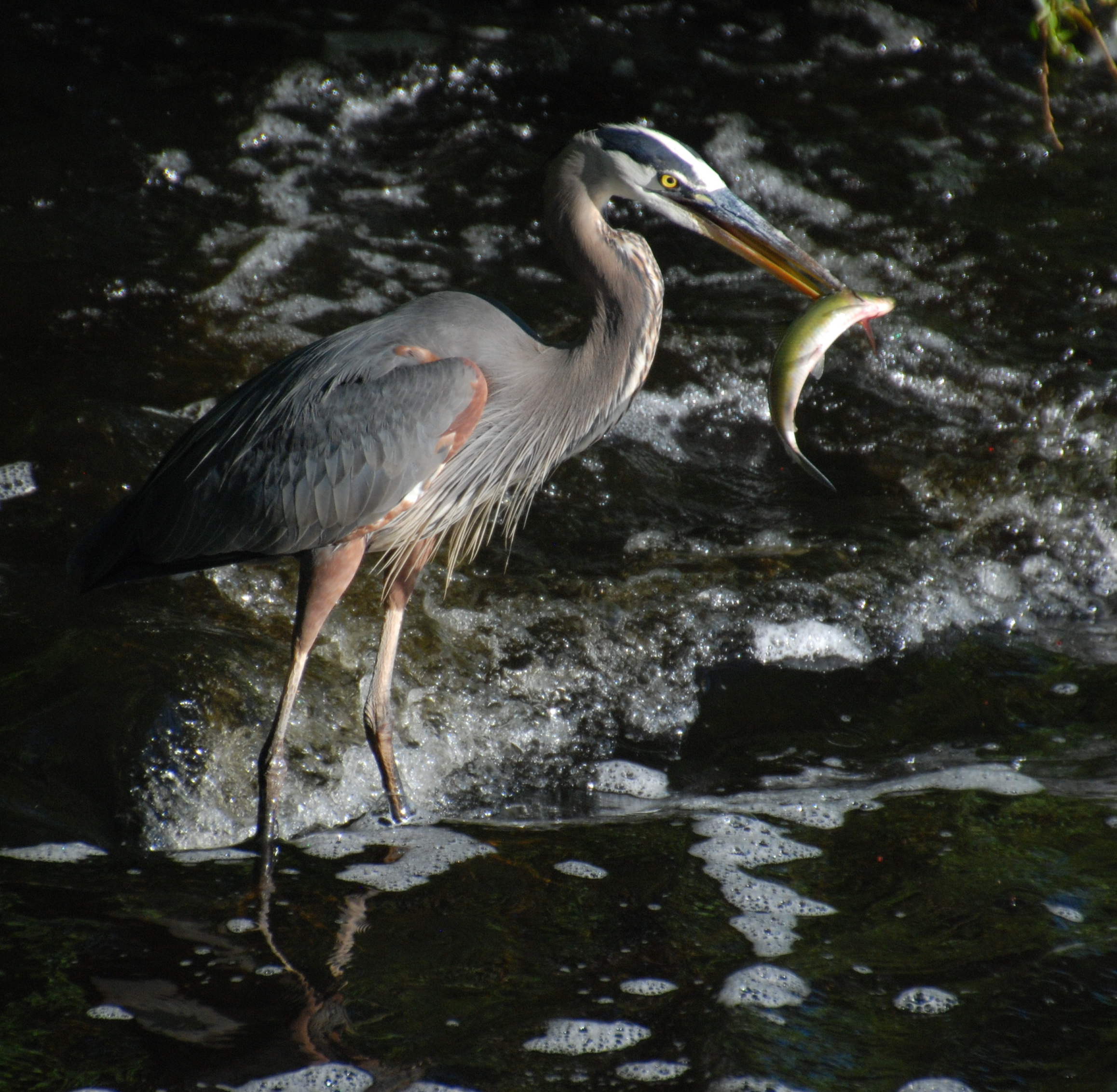
With herring
