= Edmund Fowle House =

Historic house in Massachusetts, United States

- U.S. National Register of Historic Places
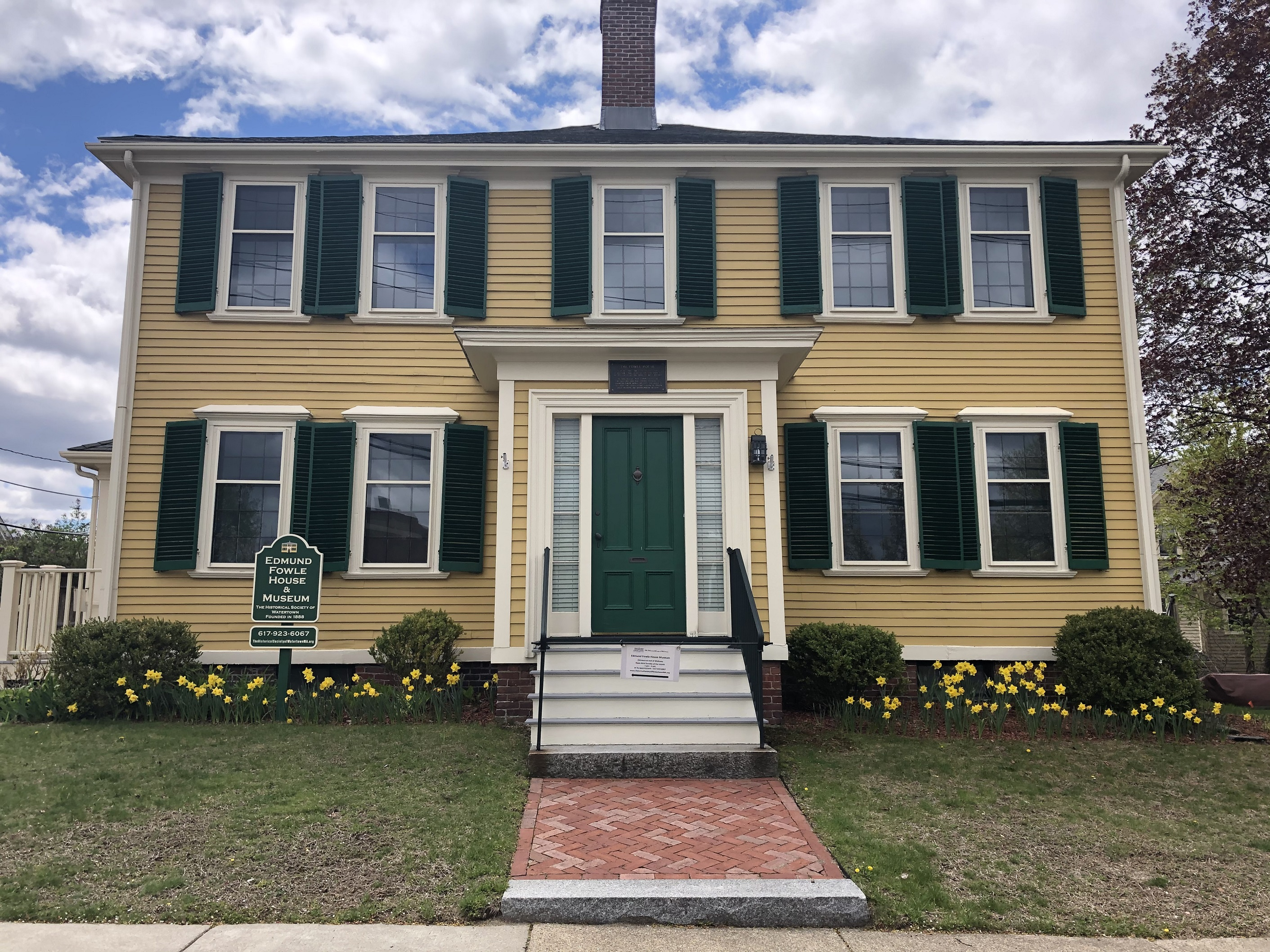
- Edmund Fowle House, Watertown, Massachusetts

- Location within Massachusetts Location within the United States
- Location: 26–28 Marshall St., Watertown, Massachusetts
- Coordinates: 42°22′6″N 71°10′51″W
- Area: less than one acre
- Built: 1772
- Architectural style: Georgian
- NRHP reference No.: 77000189
- Added to NRHP: November 11, 1977

The Edmund Fowle House is a historic house and local history museum at 28 Marshall Street in Watertown, Massachusetts, USA. Built in 1772, it is the second-oldest surviving house in Watertown (after the Browne House, built c. 1698), and served as the meeting place for the Massachusetts Executive Council in the first year of the American Revolutionary War. Now owned by the local historic society, it was listed on the National Register of Historic Places in 1977.

== Description ==
The Edmund Fowle House is located northeast of Watertown Square, on the south side of Marshall Street between Spring and Mount Auburn Streets. It is a two-story wood-frame structure, with a hip roof, central chimney, and clapboarded exterior. It has a five-bay front facade, with a center entrance sheltered by a projecting enclosed flat-roofed vestibule. The vestibule entry is flanked by sidelight windows and framed by fluted moulding.

== History ==
The house was built by Edmund Fowle (1747–1821) in 1772, and was originally located on Mount Auburn St., then called Mill St. Watertown was the seat of Massachusetts Provincial Congress, its de facto government, during the British occupation of Boston during the American Revolution. The committees of the 2nd and 3rd Provincial Congress met in this house from April 22 to July 19, 1775, and the Executive Committee met here from July 19, 1775, to September 18, 1776. In 1776, the Treaty of Watertown, the first treaty signed between the newly formed United States of America and a foreign power, the St. John's and Mi'kmaq First Nations of Nova Scotia, was signed in this house.

Sturgis and Brigham Architects (Charles Brigham and John Hubbard Sturgis) purchased the house in 1871, moved it to its present Marshall St. address and converted it into a two family residence. The Historical Society of Watertown purchased the house in 1922.

The Historical Society was awarded $500,000 in 2004 and another $200,000 in 2006 by the Commonwealth of Massachusetts for the restoration of the Edmund Fowle House. The grand re-opening of the house took place in May 2008.

== See also ==
- National Register of Historic Places listings in Middlesex County, Massachusetts
