= Asbarez =

Newspaper in Los Angeles, California

- The first issue of Asbarez
- Type: Daily newspaper
- Editor: Ara Khachatourian (English); Apo Boghikian (Armenian)
- Founded: 1908
- Language: Armenian, English
- Headquarters: 1203 N Vermont Ave, Little Armenia, Los Angeles, CA 90029 USA
- City: Los Angeles
- Country: United States
- ISSN: 0004-4229
- OCLC number: 3973991
- Website: asbarez.com

Asbarez (Armenian: Ասպարէզ "Arena") is an Armenian-American bilingual daily newspaper published in Armenian and English in Los Angeles, California.

It was the official newspaper of the Armenian Revolutionary Federation for the Western United States until a 2020 schism in the Central Committee of the Armenian Revolutionary Federation in the Western United States. Oragark is now the official newspaper.

== History ==
=== Fresno ===
In 1907, several Fresno, California residents — Aslan Aslanian, Bedros Hagopian, Levon Hagopian, Hovaness Kabadayan, Abraham Seklemian, Arpaxat Setrakian and Avedis Tufenkjian — "were in unanimous agreement that such a newspaper was absolutely necessary to serve the needs of the growing immigrant community of California." After much debate, the name Asbarez ("Arena" in Armenian) was selected, and the newspaper began publication in 1908. An editorial in the first issue stated that "The school, the Church, community organizations all have their role in satisfying the national, spiritual and social needs of the Armenian people. Equally, if not more important, is the role of the press, news and the newspaper[.]"

=== Los Angeles ===
By the 1970s, the concentration of Armenians in California shifted from the Central Valley to Los Angeles County. Instead of creating a second newspaper in Los Angeles, those attending the Armenian Revolutionary Federation moved the Asbarez operation to Southern California in 1970 and launched a regular English language section. The newspaper first printed in the Venice neighborhood of Los Angeles before moving to Glendale.

The newspaper launched a website in 1994.

The newspaper moved to Little Armenia in 2008.

==== Ownership controversy ====
In December 2020, the Armenian Revolutionary Federation's highest body, the Bureau, appointed a new Central Committee in the Western United States, citing the limitations created by the COVID-19 pandemic as reason for the appointment without the calling of a convention. In direct defiance of this official decision, a dissident group unlawfully convened its own assembly and elected a rival body, falsely claiming to represent the legitimate Central Committee of the ARF Western United States. The splinter group took control of the bank account and various movable and immovable properties of the Western Region, including Asbarez. In April 2022, the newspaper Oragark was established as the new official publication of the Armenian Revolutionary Federation in the Western United States.

== See also ==
- Oragark
- The Armenian Weekly
