= Watertown Bridge =

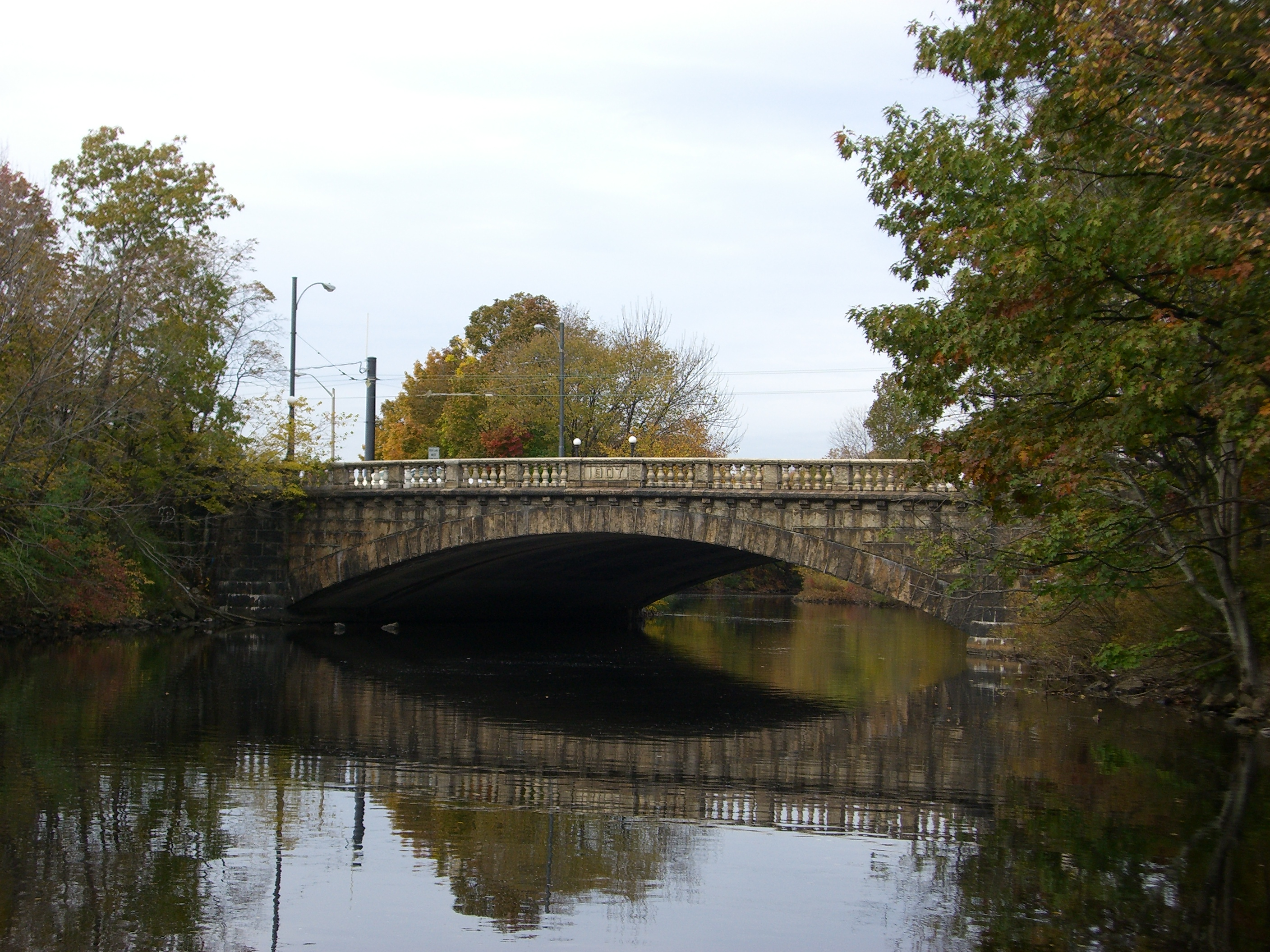
- The Watertown Bridge from the north bank of the Charles River looking west
- Coordinates: 42.364740°N 71.185617°W
- Carries: 5 lanes of Route 16 & Galen St. 2 Pedestrian Walkways
- Crosses: Charles River
- Locale: Watertown, Massachusetts

History
- Opened: 1907

The Watertown Bridge is a five-lane bridge over the Charles River, carrying Massachusetts State Route 16 (SR 16) and Galen Street. It connects Watertown Square on the north side and Watertown Yard on the south side of Watertown, Massachusetts. Pedestrian walkways line each side.

== History ==
Beginning as a ford, this river crossing has been spanned by bridges since 1641. The current span dates from 1907. Previous bridges date from 1647, 1667, and 1719.

The 1994 film The River Wild opens with Meryl Streep rowing downstream under the Watertown Bridge.

== See also ==
- List of crossings of the Charles River
