= Watertown Square =

Road intersection in Massachusetts, U.S.

- Neighborhood and road intersection
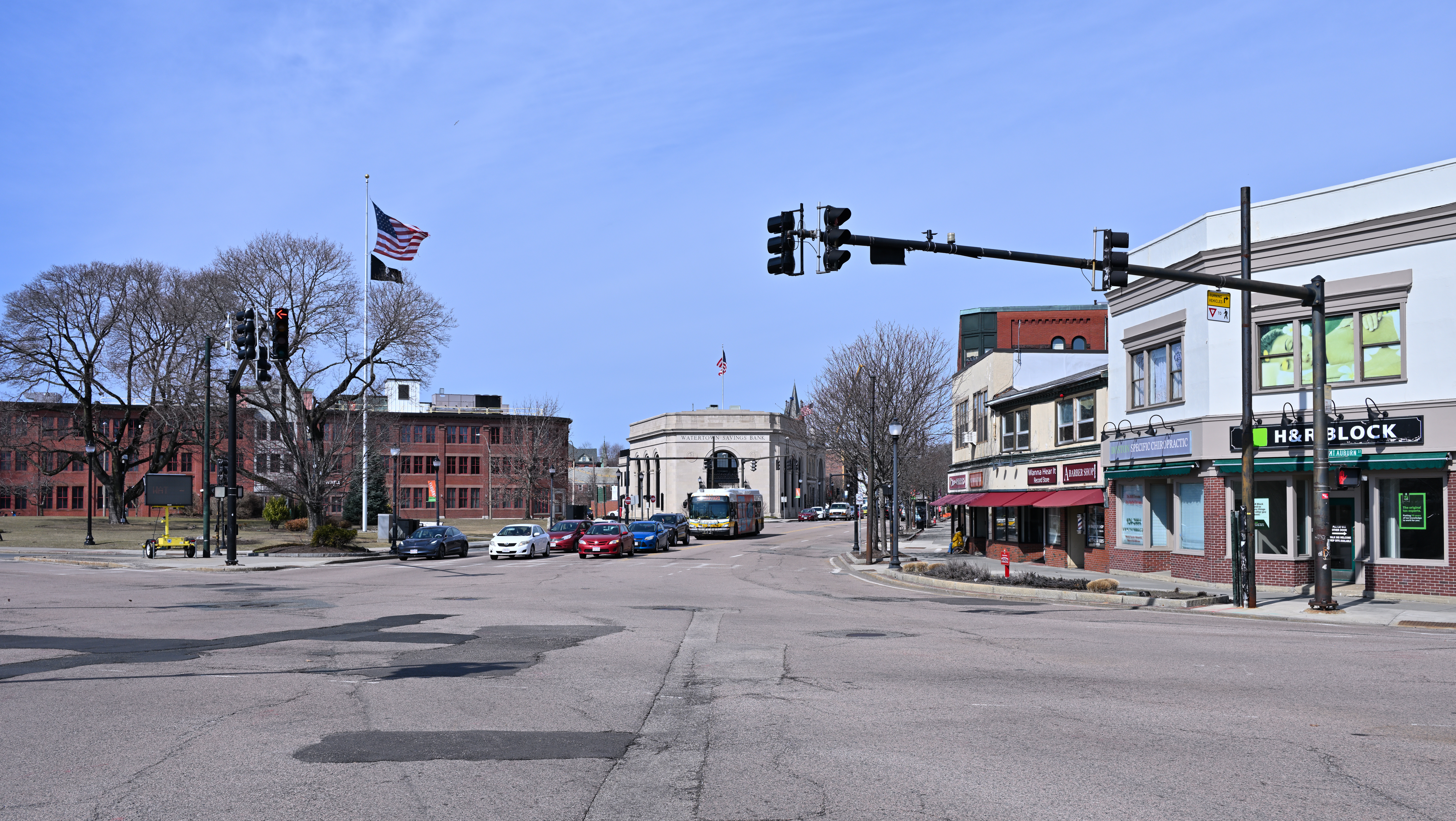
- Looking west across the square from the middle of North Beacon Street (2025)
- Location in Watertown, Massachusetts
- Coordinates: 42.3652°N 71.1844°W
- State: Massachusetts
- County: Middlesex
- City: Watertown

Watertown Square is a neighborhood in Watertown, Massachusetts, centered on the intersection of Main Street and North Beacon Street (both part of U.S. Route 20) and Galen Street and Mount Auburn Street (both part of State Route 16).

The square stands immediately to the north of the Charles River, which is crossed by the Watertown Bridge on Galen Street. The Armenian Library and Museum of America is located in the square; Watertown Dam is 1,000 feet (300 m) to the west.

MBTA bus routes 59 and 71 terminate in a busway on the west side of the square, while route 70 stops on the north side.

The Watertown Savings Bank Building, erected in 1921, overlooks the square from the west.

== History ==
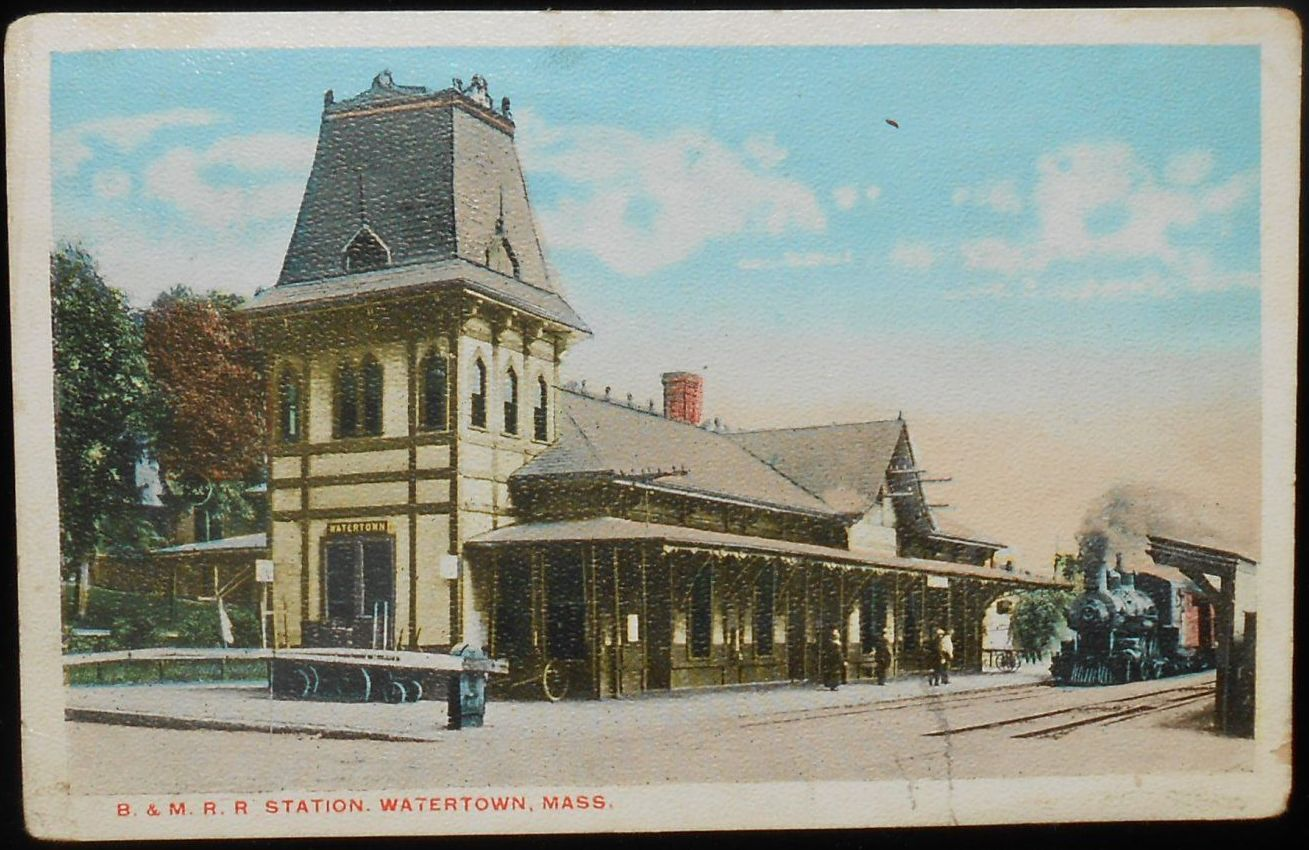
Postcard of Watertown station

The Watertown Branch Railroad opened through Watertown Square in 1847. Passenger service on the line ended on July 9, 1938, and the second track was removed by early 1940. The middle section of the line from the Waltham/Watertown line through Watertown Square to East Watertown was abandoned in 1960. The former Watertown station was reused as a lumber company by 1968, but later demolished.

In September 2023, a new plan for the square was announced by the City of Watertown. The city plans to reconfigure the square to add public space and support future housing development. Charles River Road and Riverside Street would be rerouted to the east, creating a standard four-way intersection between Main/North Beacon and Galen/Mount Auburn. MBTA routes 59 and 71 would be extended to Watertown Yard, with the Columbus Delta park expanded onto the former busway area.
