= Exergen Corporation =

- Company type: Private
- Founded: 1980; 46 years ago
- Founder: Francesco Pompei
- Headquarters: Watertown, Massachusetts
- Key people: Francesco Pompei; President
- Products: See products section
- Website: www.exergen.com

Exergen Corporation is a designer and manufacturer of infrared scanners, thermometers, and sensors headquartered in Watertown, Massachusetts. Exergen's products are used in application in medical, automotive, food processing, agriculture and textile. The company was founded by Francesco Pompei in 1980.

== Products ==
Exergen's products include:

=== Thermometers ===
- 1985 - D-Series - Emissivity error-free infrared thermometer.
- 1988 - Ototemp - Scanning tympanic medical thermometer.
- 1990 - Ototemp Veterinary - Tympanic thermometer for animals.
- 1991 - Ear thermometer employing arterial heat balance.
- 1996 - Infrared axillary thermometer.
- 1997 - Consumer infrared axillary thermometer.
- 1999 - Temporal artery thermometers for professionals and consumers.
- 2000 - Palm-sized emissivity error-free infrared thermometer.

=== Scanners ===
- 1983 - Microscanner - Pocket-sized infrared temperature scanner.
- 1987 - E-Series - Infrared scanner designed exclusively for electrical inspection.
- 1987 - Dermatemp - Infrared scanner for emissivity error-free skin temperature assessment.
- 1989 - Equine Scanner - Scanner for injury assessment of equine athletes.

=== Sensors ===
- 1991 - IRt/c - Unpowered IR thermocouple
- 2002 - Microprocessor-based linearized, infrared temperature sensor.
- 2004 - 20:1 field of view microprocessor-based linearized, infrared temperature sensor.

=== Thermocouples ===
- 2003 - Micro-sized, unpowered IR thermocouple.
- 2004 - 4:1 field of view, unpowered IR thermocouple.

=== Other products ===
- 1980 - Exergram - Quantitative heat loss camera system for energy conservation.
- 1995 - Thermal switch to detect presence of hot melt adhesive and hot objects.

== Mission ==
In respect to Exergen's mission, Francesco Pompei, Ph.D., the CEO of Exergen Corporation stated that, "Our mission is based on the fact that nothing matters more than accuracy in temperature taking, whether in a professional setting or at home." In 2023, Exergen through Pompei emphasized the importance of this mission ahead of cold and flu season stating, "It is our responsibility to educate healthcare professionals and consumers that non-contact infrared thermometers (NCITs) are inaccurate, and on how to correctly take a temperature reading."
