= Francesco Pompei =

Francesco "Frank" Pompei is the founder and chief executive officer of Exergen Corporation. Pompei earned BS and MS mechanical engineering degrees from the Massachusetts Institute of Technology. He also earned an MS and PhD from Harvard University. In addition to his work with Exergen, Pompei holds an appointment as Research scholar in the Dept. of Physics at Harvard. Pompei created the technology that led to the invention of Exergen's Temporal Scanner while working as a researcher at Harvard and he holds 60 patents in "non-invasive thermometry for medical and industrial applications."
