= J.C. Cannistraro =

Cannistraro
- Company type: Private
- Industry: Mechanical construction
- Founded: Watertown, Massachusetts U.S. (June 1963)
- Founder: John Cannistraro, Sr.
- Headquarters: Watertown, Massachusetts, U.S.
- Key people: John C. Cannistraro, Jr., President; David G. Cannistraro, CEO; Joseph C. Cannistraro, CFO
- Services: Plumbing services, HVAC systems and piping, Sheet metal fabrication, Fire protection systems, Services, Safety, Prefabrication, and Construction technology
- Website: cannistraro.com

J.C. Cannistraro, LLC (commonly referred to as Cannistraro) is a privately held mechanical construction firm headquartered in Watertown, Massachusetts. The company provides HVAC, fire Protection and facilities maintenance services for large mechanical plants at hospitals, universities, laboratories, and many other facilities. Using the progressive construction technologies along with the most modern prefabrication capabilities, Cannistraro offers complete mechanical services from pre-construction through service and maintenance throughout New England.

== History ==
In 1963, John Cannistraro, Sr., with the help of his wife Rita, invested $1500 and founded a small plumbing shop named J.C. Cannistraro, Inc. in Watertown, Massachusetts. Soon after, the company began installing plumbing systems for MassPort at Boston's Logan International Airport.

In 1984, John Cannistraro, Sr., purchased the ice house from the Jac-Pac Company, a frozen meat distributor, and moved the company from a garage on Pleasant Street in Watertown. Over the next two decades, the site became a large complex which houses the prefabrication facilities and corporate offices. The company is in its second generation with the current President, John Cannistraro, Jr., and he is being assisted in running the company by three other siblings, and a team of non-family management specialists.

Today, Cannistraro designs and builds mechanical systems for public and private construction projects. The company employs more than 500 people with annual revenues of more than $250,000,000.

- Mirebalais National Teaching Hospital, Haiti
- Millennium Tower, Boston
- Gillette Stadium, Foxborough, Massachusetts
- Vertex Pharmaceuticals Headquarters, Boston

== Awards ==
- Cannistraro named in Boston Globe's 2013 Top Places to Work survey.
- PHC News Magazine named Cannistraro as Contractor of the Year in 2011.
