= Mosesian Center for the Arts =

Community arts center located in Watertown, Massachusetts, United States

Coordinates: 42.36276°N 71.16461°W

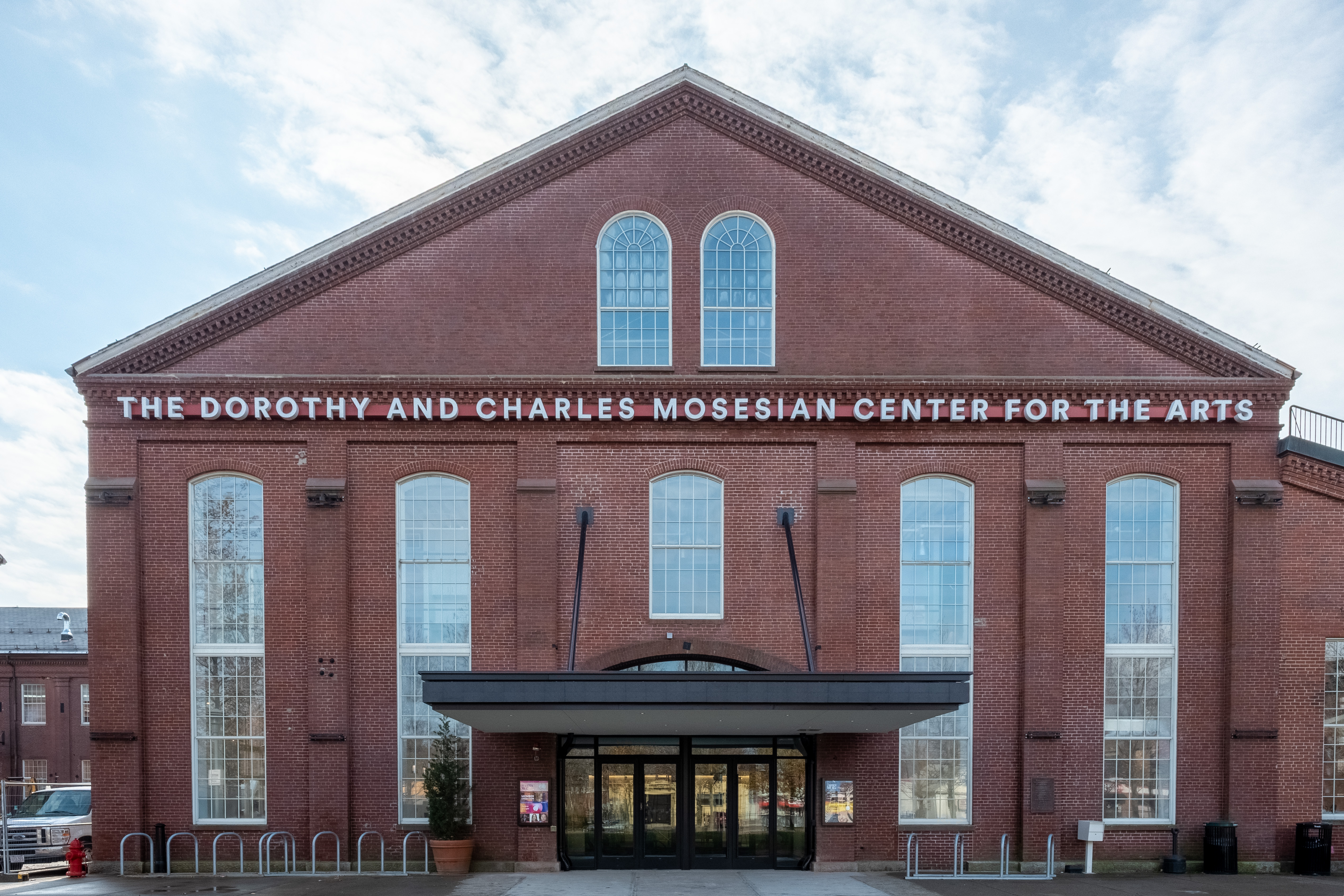
The Dorothy and Charles Mosesian Center for the Arts, Watertown, MA

The Dorothy and Charles Mosesian Center for the Arts (formerly Arsenal Center for the Arts) is a nonprofit multidisciplinary arts venue on the Charles River in Watertown, Massachusetts, United States. The 30,000 square foot center, located in an historic 1894 manufacturing shop of the U.S. Army's Watertown Arsenal, houses a 339-seat main stage theater, a 100-seat black box theater, exhibition galleries, art classrooms, and rehearsal studios. Mosesian Arts is located six miles from downtown Boston, borders Brighton and the Charles, and is accessible from surrounding suburbs and MetroWest.

Programming includes professional theater and musical performances, comedy, gallery exhibitions, literary and art discussions, and performing and visual arts classes and workshops for all ages. Watertown Children’s Theatre, Mosesian Arts’ performing arts education program, provides classes and performances for youth and families. The venue also hosts other performing arts companies from throughout the Greater Boston region.

== History ==
Plans for an art center in Watertown had begun as early as the 1970s, but insufficient funds were raised and the project was shelved. The arts center in its current form is the culmination of years of fundraising efforts which began in 1998 with the formation of Watertown Arts on the Charles, or WATCH.

In 1999, a market feasibility study commissioned by WATCH concluded that Watertown would be an ideal location for a multipurpose art center to service Watertown and the surrounding area. The site ultimately chosen for construction of the facility was building 321 of the former Army Materials Technology Laboratory in Watertown, a Superfund site. O'Neill properties, who bought the Watertown Arsenal property from the town for $24 million in 1998, pledged 15,000 square feet (1,400 m^{2}) of space as well as $1 million towards construction costs.

Initially, the group estimated total construction costs to be in the range of $2.5 million to $4 million, however the final cost for the project ended up being in the area of $7.5 million. The funds for the center were raised primarily through community donations including $1 million from the town and a $1 million donation from local entrepreneur Charles Mosesian, for whom the center's main theater is named.

After years of fundraising and construction, the center finally opened in the summer of 2005. In 2013, the Arts Center and longtime performing partner Watertown Children’s Theatre merged the two organizations. In 2016, Arsenal Center for the Arts was renamed The Dorothy and Charles Mosesian Center for the Arts, in recognition of continued support from the Mosesian Family Foundation. The current Executive Director, Darren Farrington, joined the organization in August 2020.

In 2021, a major renovation of the entrance, lobby, and other public and administrative areas was completed with architects and designers at Sasaki. In addition to increasing useable space and improving public health and accessibility, the new lobby connects a modern vision with the building’s military history. Gunmetal finishes, reclaimed wood, and industrial ceilings and floors acknowledge the manufacturing past, and a contemporary and minimalist design places focus on the art on gallery walls.

== Gallery ==
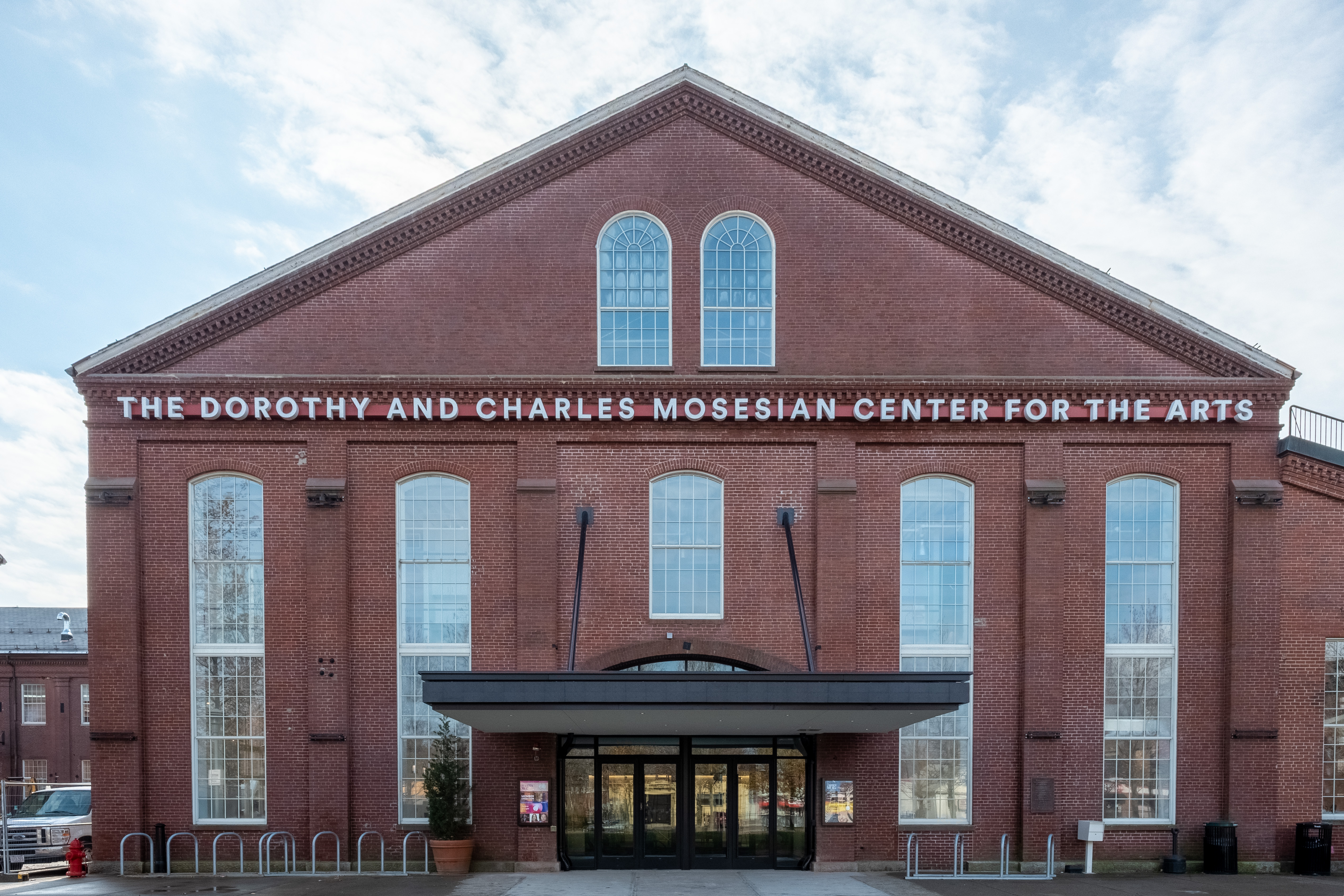
Mosesian Center for the Arts

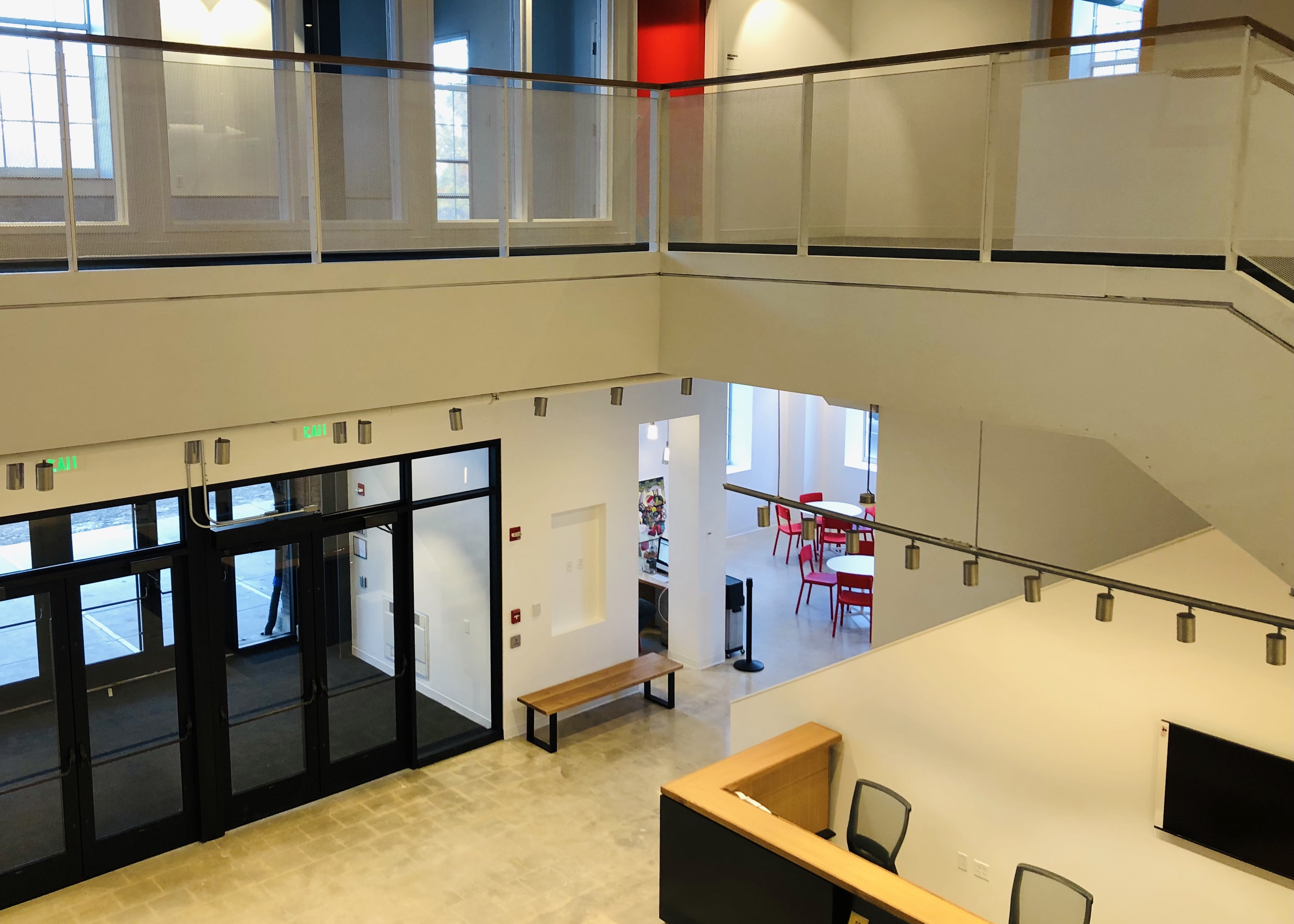
Mosesian Arts lobby

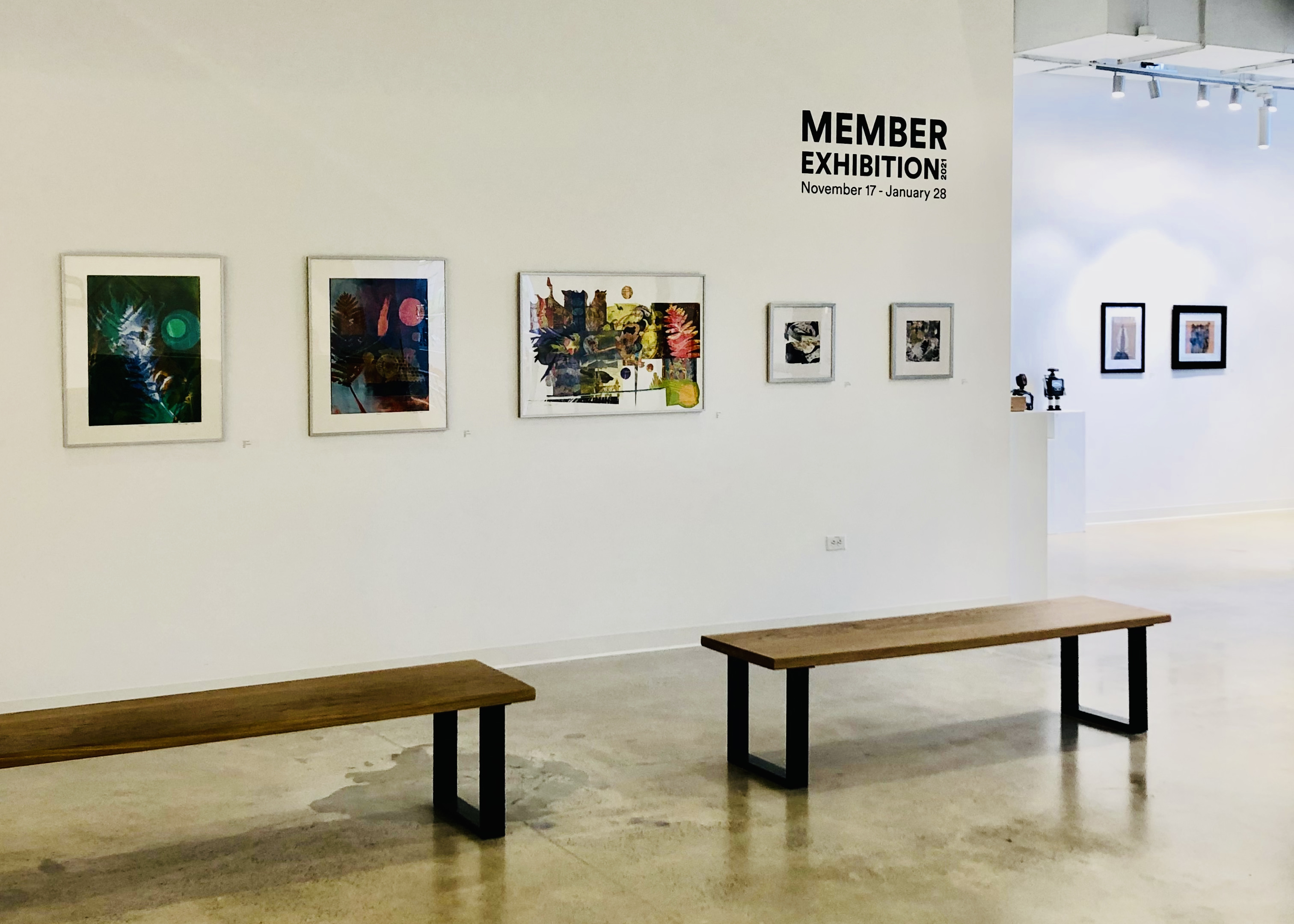
Mosesian Arts gallery

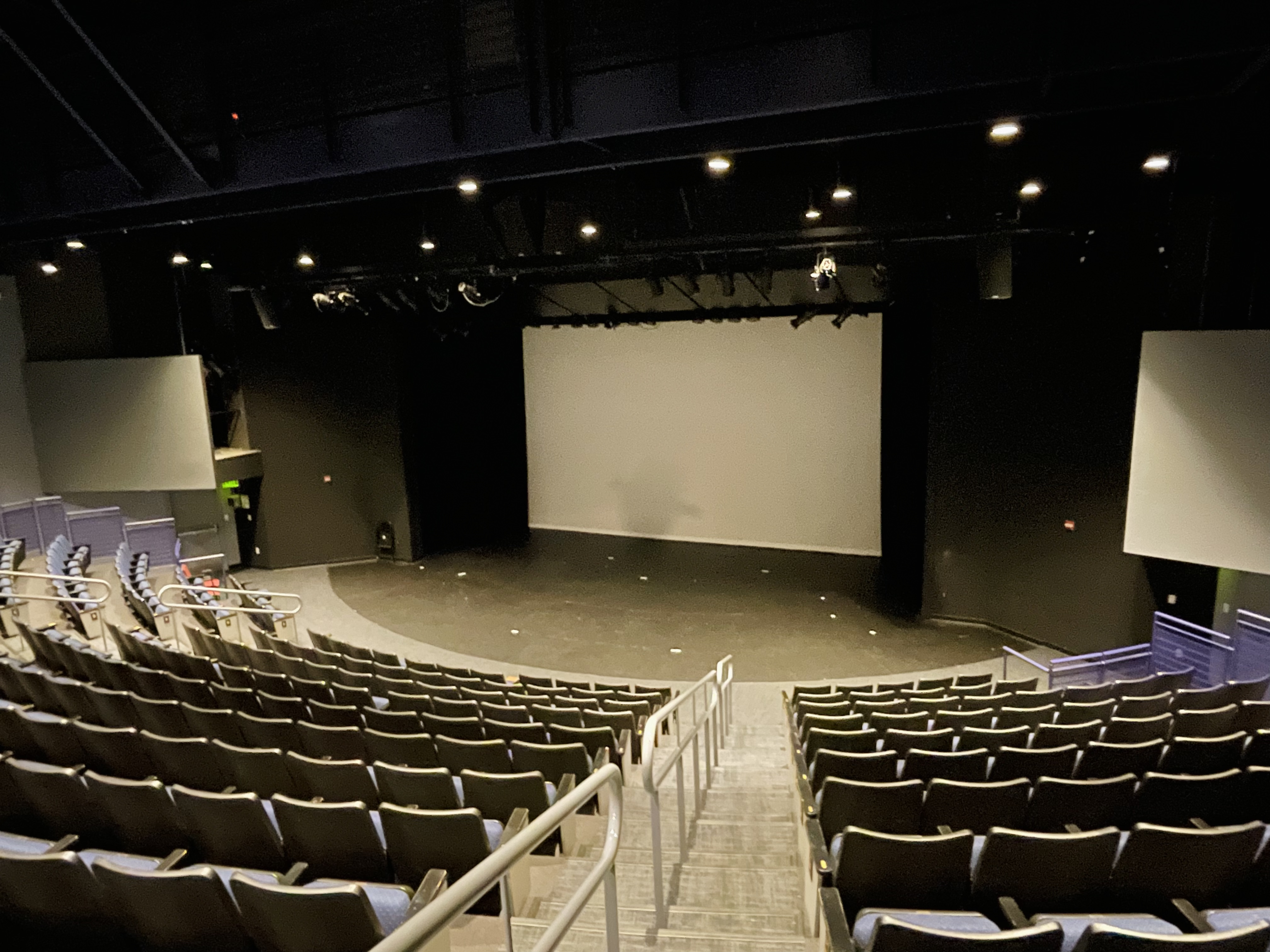
The Charles Mosesian Theater

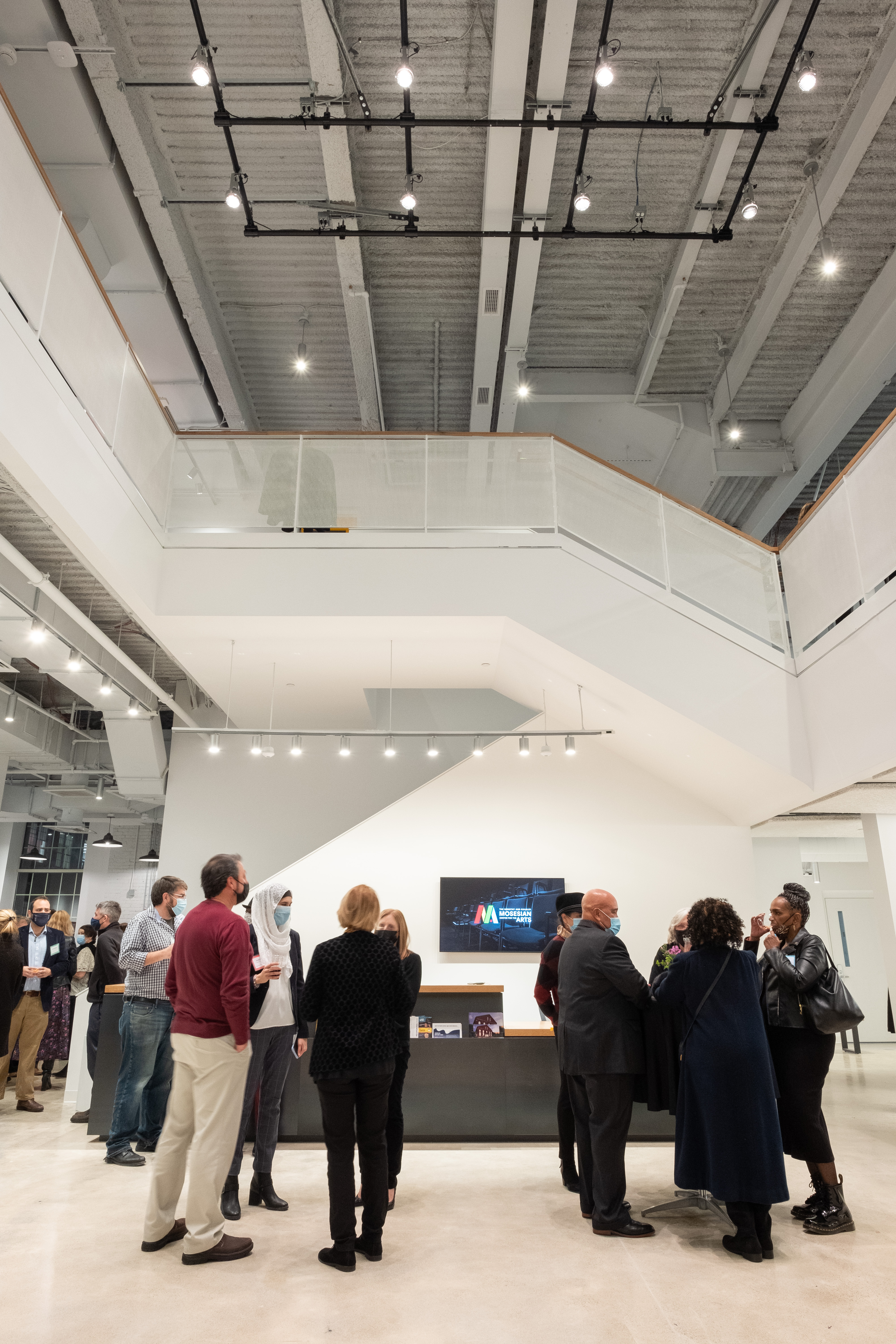
Mosesian Arts information desk

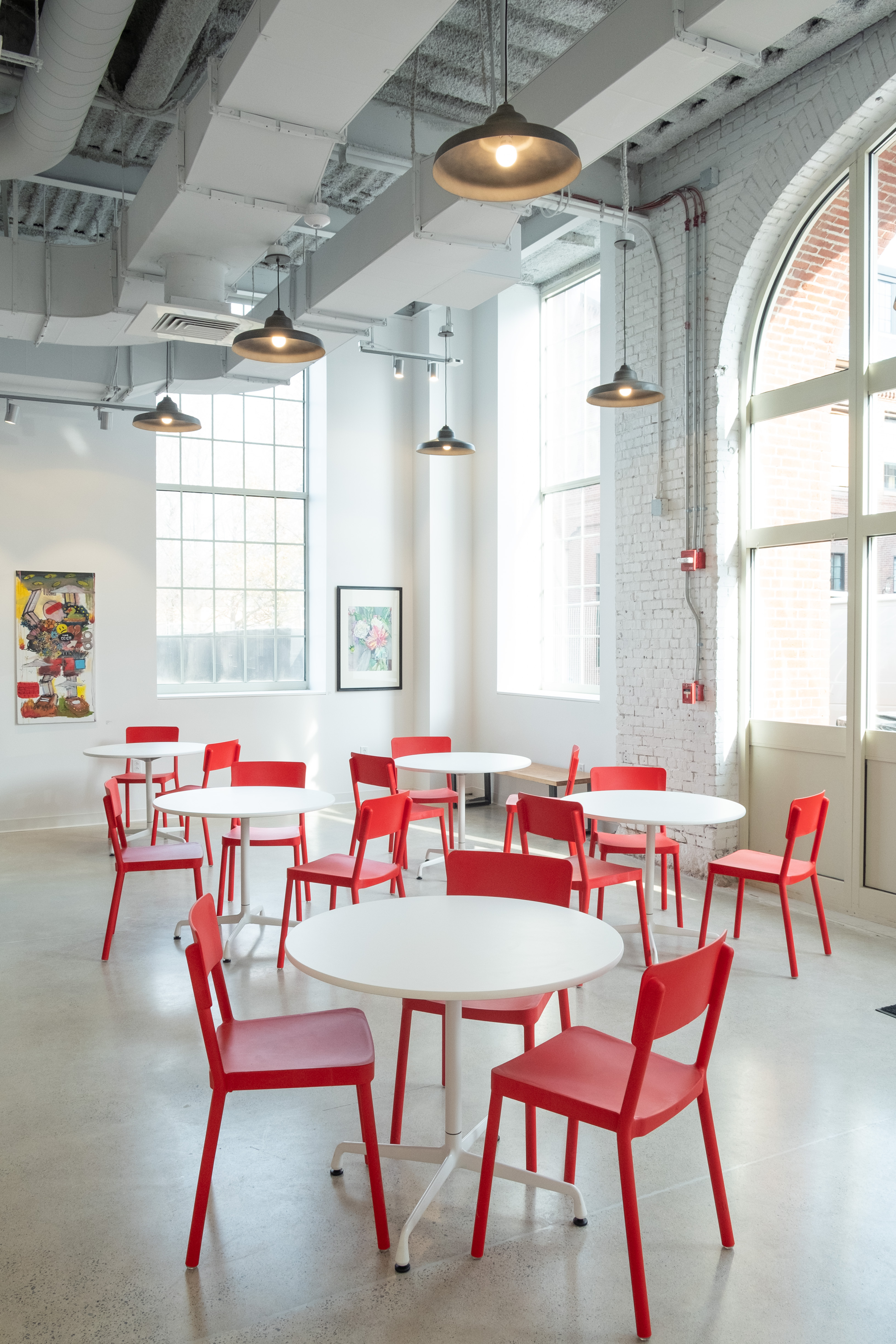
Mosesian Arts MBar
