= The Armenian Weekly =

English-language newspaper published in the US

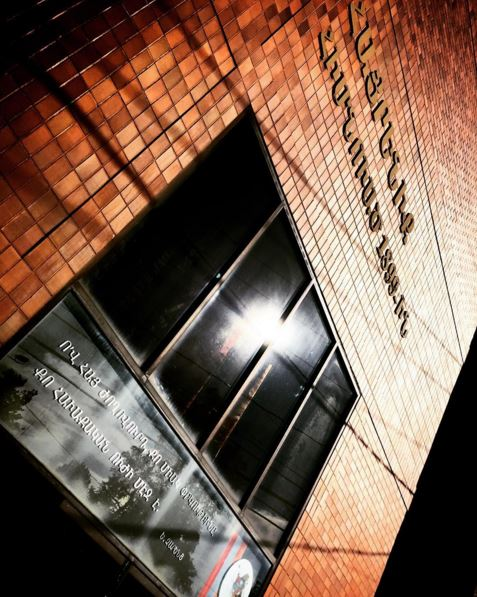
- Type: Weekly newspaper (1934-2025); Online newspaper (since 2025)
- Owner: Hairenik Association
- Editor: Lilly Torosyan
- Founded: 1934; 92 years ago
- Language: English
- City: Watertown, Massachusetts
- Country: United States
- Sister newspapers: Hairenik
- Website: armenianweekly.com

The Armenian Weekly (originally Hairenik Weekly) is an English language Armenian online newspaper published by Hairenik Association, Inc. in Watertown, Massachusetts in the United States. It is the sister publication to the Armenian language online newspaper Hairenik. It was started as Hairenik Weekly in 1934 and its name was changed to The Armenian Weekly, the name under which it is still published, in 1969. The Armenian Weekly also runs an online publication, which became its sole publication, after it ceased publishing its print editions in 2025.

The newspaper belongs to the Armenian political party Armenian Revolutionary Federation (ARF).

== Hairenik Weekly (1934–1969) ==
In June 1932, the Armenian-language Hairenik had started a column in English to address the needs of English-speaking Armenians. The response was so positive that by March 1934 the Hairenik Weekly was established entirely in English and began publication, mostly through the efforts of young volunteer contributors. In June 1934 Hairenik Weekly acquired a full-time editor, James Mandalian, and an assistant editor, Queenie Pambookjian. Notably, there were translations of short stories by such prominent Armenian writers as Avetis Aharonian and Hamasdegh and the poems of Gostan Zarian. Moreover, the very stories that initially brought William Saroyan national recognition by the American public were first published in the Hairenik Weekly (under the pseudonym "Sirak Goryan").

== The Armenian Weekly (1969–present) ==
Today, along with news of general interest to the Armenian-American community, The Armenian Weekly publishes editorials, political analyzes, regular columns, short stories, and poems. The newspaper, while reflecting the Armenian Revolutionary Federation and Armenian National Committee of America (ANCA), is also open to a wide variety of views and opinions in which the pros and cons of issues can be discussed openly and honestly. Youth activities are still reported in each issue, upcoming events are announced in the calendar and cultural activities are reported through music, dance and movie reviews.

Although The Armenian Weekly's headquarters are located in Watertown, Massachusetts, subscribers hail from as near as Boston and as far as Buenos Aires and beyond.

In March 2025, both the English language The Armenian Weekly and the Armenian language Hairenik unveiled a new logo and rebrand. They also released updated websites and expanded social media engagement. In late June 2025, both the English language The Armenian Weekly and the Armenian language Hairenik printed their final weekly editions, thus becoming solely online newspapers.

== Editors ==
The following is a list of former editors of the Hairenik Weekly/The Armenian Weekly:

- Armen Bardizian (March 1934 - June 1934)
- James G. Mandalian (1934–1969)
- James H. Tashjian (1945–1981)
- Laura Tosoonian (1977–1978)
- Ohan S. Balian (1979–1982)
- Tom Vartabedian (1982–1983)
- Georgi-Ann (Bargamian) Oshagan (1982–1984)
- Muriel (Mimi) Parseghian (1984–1989)
- Antranig Kasbarian (1987–1992)
- Vahe Habeshian (1990–1996)
- Viken Aprahamian (1996–1997)
- Peter Nersesian (1998–1999)
- Arto Payaslian (1999–2000)
- Jason Sohigian (1999–2004)
- Sossi Esajanian (acting editor 2004–2005)
- Jenny Kiljian (2005–2007)
- Khatchig Mouradian (2007–2014)
- Nanore Barsoumian (2014–2016)
- Rupen Janbazian (2016–2018)
- Karine Vann (2018–2019)
- Pauline Getzoyan (November 2019–2024)
- Lilly Torosyan (2025-Present)

== Columnists ==
The following is a list of all known columnists of The Armenian Weekly:

- Kegham Balian
- C. K. Garabed
- Stepan Piligian
- Harut Sassounian
- Yeghia Tashjian
- Garen Yegparian
- Milena Baghdasaryan
- Jason Takhtadjian

== See also ==
- Asbarez
- Media in Armenia
