= Browne House =

Historic house in Massachusetts, United States

Coordinates: 42.37187°N 71.19982°W

- Abraham Browne House
- U.S. National Register of Historic Places
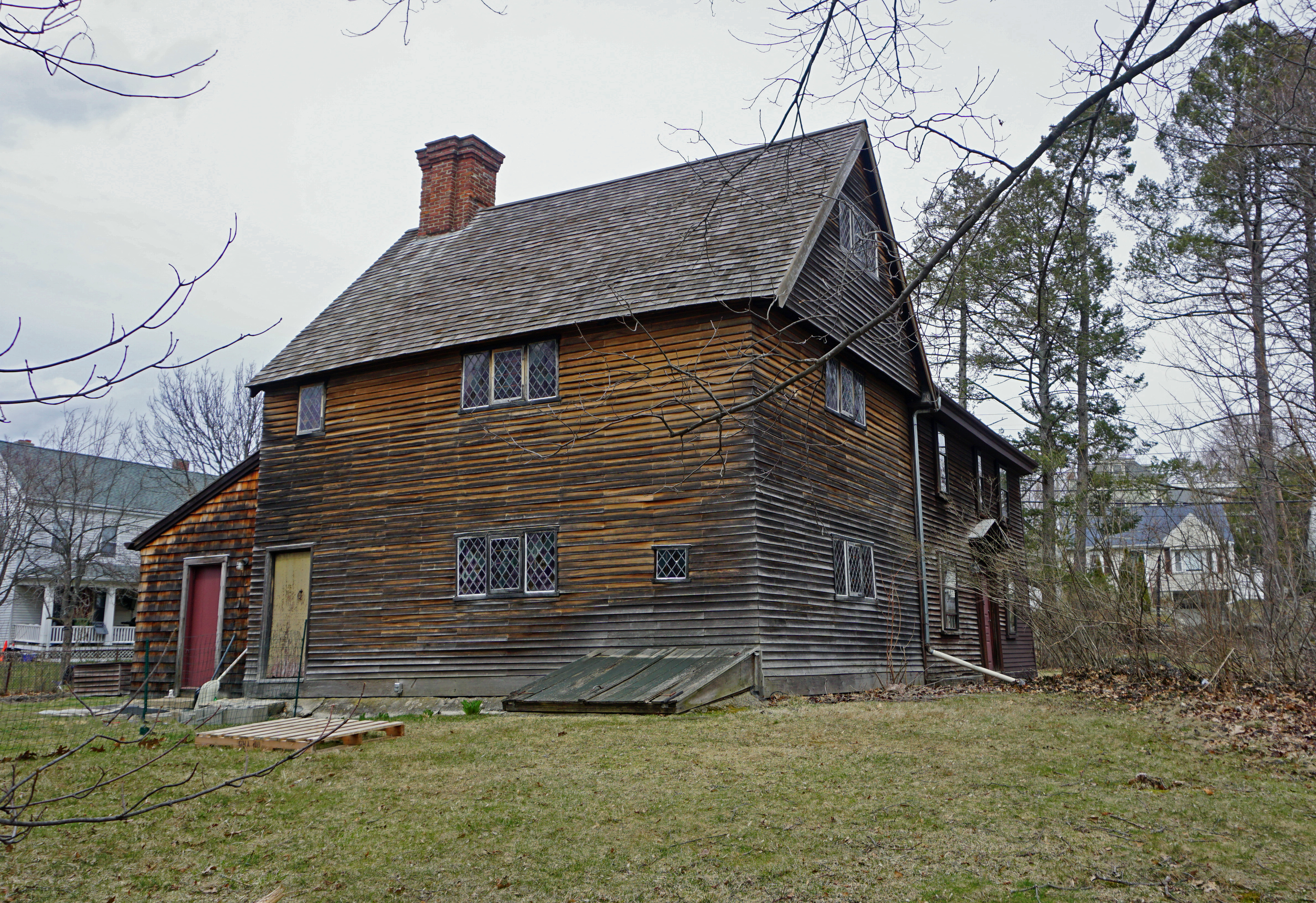
- The Abraham Browne House, Watertown, Massachusetts
- Location: 562 Main St. Watertown, Massachusetts
- MPS: First Period Buildings of Eastern Massachusetts TR
- NRHP reference No.: 90000186
- Added to NRHP: March 9, 1990

The Abraham Browne House (built c. 1694–1701) is a colonial house located at 562 Main Street, Watertown, Massachusetts, US. It is now a nonprofit museum operated by Historic New England and open to the public.

The house was originally a modest one-over-one dwelling. The house features steep roofing and casement windows. During restoration works in 1919, details of 17th century finish were found. The ground floor consists of one large room that is used for living, cooking, and sleeping.

By 1919 the house was nearly ruined when it was acquired by William Sumner Appleton, who in 1923 donated it to Historic New England. The house has grown by a series of enlargements but they occurred behind the original block, thus preserving the profile of the one-over-one elevation. The exception, a 19th-century addition, was removed before 1919. The Browne House is one of fewer than a half-dozen houses in New England to retain this profile.

The Abraham Browne house was featured on PBS's This Old House television program.

== See also ==
- List of historic houses in Massachusetts
- List of the oldest buildings in Massachusetts
- National Register of Historic Places listings in Middlesex County, Massachusetts
