= Hairenik Association =

American publishing house

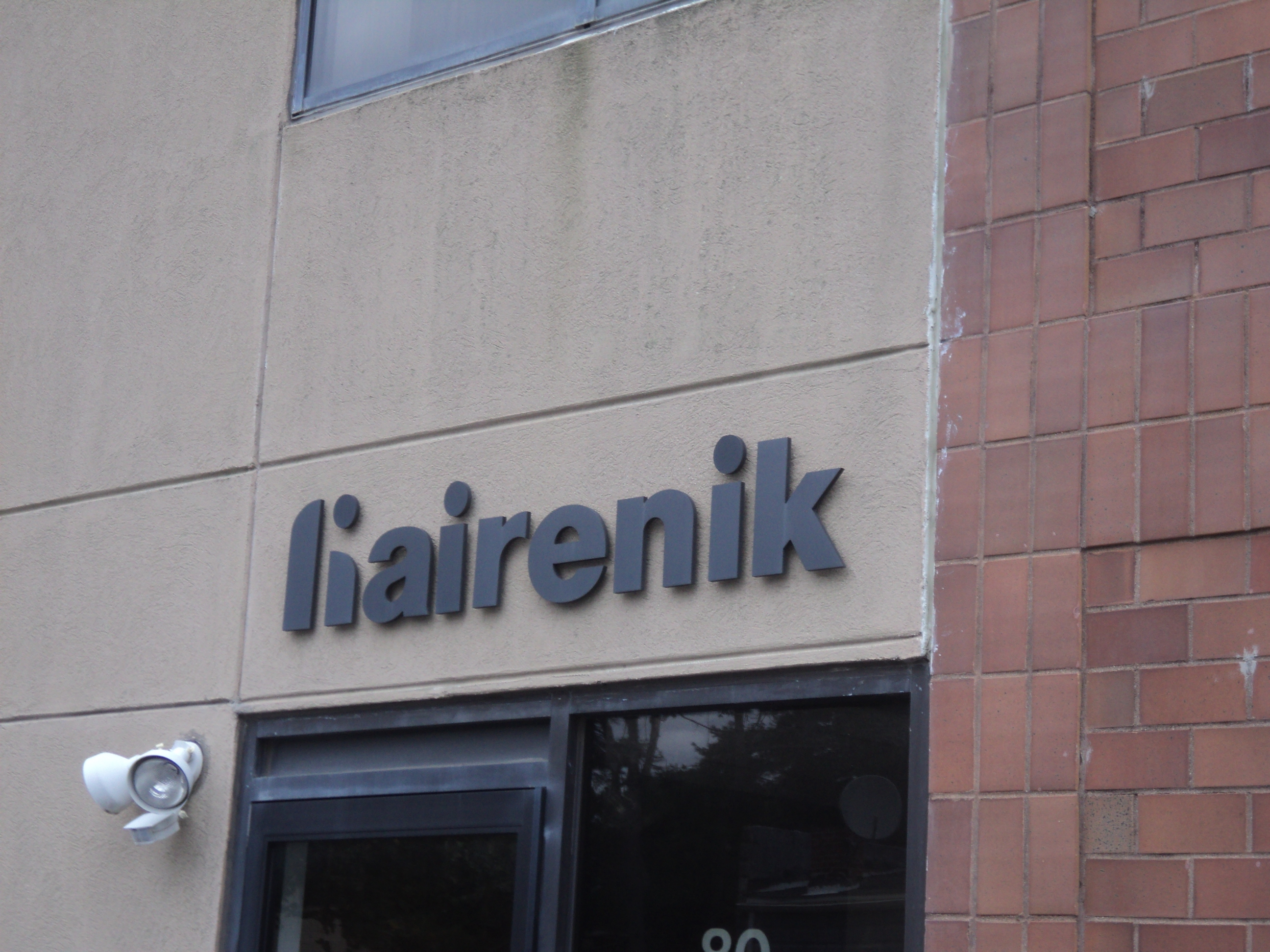
The Hairenik Association building in Watertown, MA.

Hairenik Association (Hairenik Association Inc.) is a publishing house fully owned and operated by the Armenian Revolutionary Federation located in Watertown, Massachusetts, United States.

== Publications ==
Its publications have included:

- Hairenik, an entirely Armenian-language online newspaper (formerly a daily, and later formerly a weekly)
- Armenian Weekly an English-language online newspaper (formerly Hairenik Weekly, and formerly a weekly)
- Hairenik Monthly and presently quarterly
- Armenian Review, an English language periodical

It also publishes many books, calendars and special commemorative publications

== Web Broadcasts ==
Hairenik Association also runs a web radio and a web TV station.

== Hairenik Building Restoration Fund ==
The Hairenik Building Restoration Fund is a campaign to raise money to upgrade and repair the Hairenik Building, the Watertown offices of the Hairenik Association.

The Hairenik Association moved to its present location in 1986 following a long fundraising campaign to replace its aging headquarters on Stuart Street in downtown Boston. Following the 1998 campaign that retired the building's mortgage, the Restoration Fund seeks to modernize the Hairenik Building and return it to a good state of repair.
