= Hairenik =

Armenian language weekly newspaper

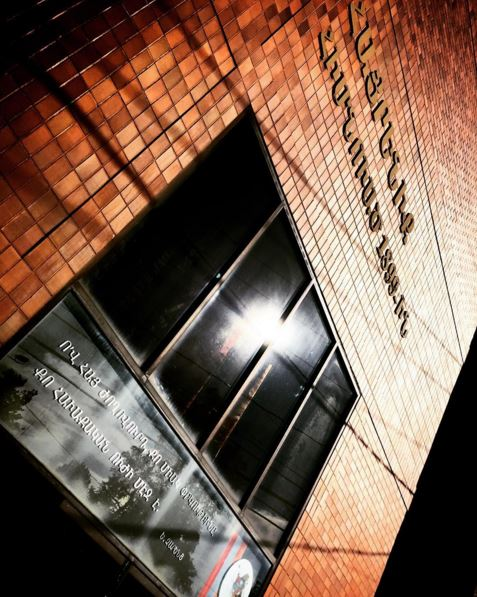
- Type: Weekly newspaper (1899-1913); Bi-daily newspaper (1913-1915); Daily newspaper (1915-1991); Weekly newspaper (1991-2025); Online newspaper (since 2025)
- Owner: Hairenik Association
- Founded: May 1, 1899; 127 years ago
- Language: Western Armenian
- City: Watertown, Massachusetts
- Country: United States
- Sister newspapers: Armenian Weekly
- Website: hairenikweekly.com

Hairenik (Armenian: Հայրենիք meaning "fatherland") is an Armenian language weekly newspaper published by the Hairenik Association in Watertown, Massachusetts, United States. It is the sister publication to the English language online newspaper The Armenian Weekly. The newspaper belongs to the Armenian political party – Armenian Revolutionary Federation (ARF). The newspaper reflects the views and opinions of ARF as well as Armenian diaspora organizations – ANCAs (Armenian National Committee of America). Hairenik also runs an online publication, which became its sole publication, after it ceased publishing its print editions in 2025.

== History ==
The newspaper, serving the Armenian American community, was established as a weekly in on May 1, 1899, making it one of the longest-running Armenian publications. It moved to Boston, Massachusetts in 1900, then to Watertown in 1986.

In June 1913, it started publishing once every two days, and in December 1915, it became a daily newspaper, with continuous publication as such until 1991, when it was reduced to weekly publication due to declining readership.

In March 2025, both the Armenian language Hairenik and the English language The Armenian Weekly unveiled a new logo and rebrand. They also released updated websites and expanded social media engagement. In late June 2025, both the Armenian language Hairenik and the English language The Armenian Weekly printed their final weekly editions, thus becoming solely online newspapers.

It has had the involvement of prominent Armenian national figures as editors such as Arshak Vramian (1900–1907), Siamanto (1909–1911), Simon Vratsian (1911–1914), and Rouben Darbinian (1922–1968).

Hairenik published early stories by William Saroyan, such as "The Broken Wheel" (1933), written under the pen name "Sirak Goryan".

== Controversies ==
Leon Tourian was an Armenian Archbishop who was stabbed to the death by ARF members. Before the assassination the Hairenik newspaper published threatening messages like:

"Archbishop Tourian will be punished sooner or later. The day of reckoning will come." . . . "He is going to be sorry for it, and very sorry." . . . "He will get his share, I am sure." . . . "Until Tourian is punished ruthlessly, the bones of our martyrs will not rest in their places."

It offered $100 reward to someone who will "teach Tourian a lesson". Later on Tourian asked for police protection.

The newspaper has been criticized for having quotes and thoughts which had sympathy to Nazism, Fascism, Antisemitism, Adolf Hitler, and "race worshipping" etc.

== Other Hairenik Association publications ==
Hairenik Association Inc. has also published :

- Hairenik Monthly, from 1922 to 1967
- Hairenik Quarterly, from 1968 to 1971
- Armenian Weekly, an English language publication since 1932.
- The Armenian Review, an English language publication
