= Watertown, Massachusetts =

- City
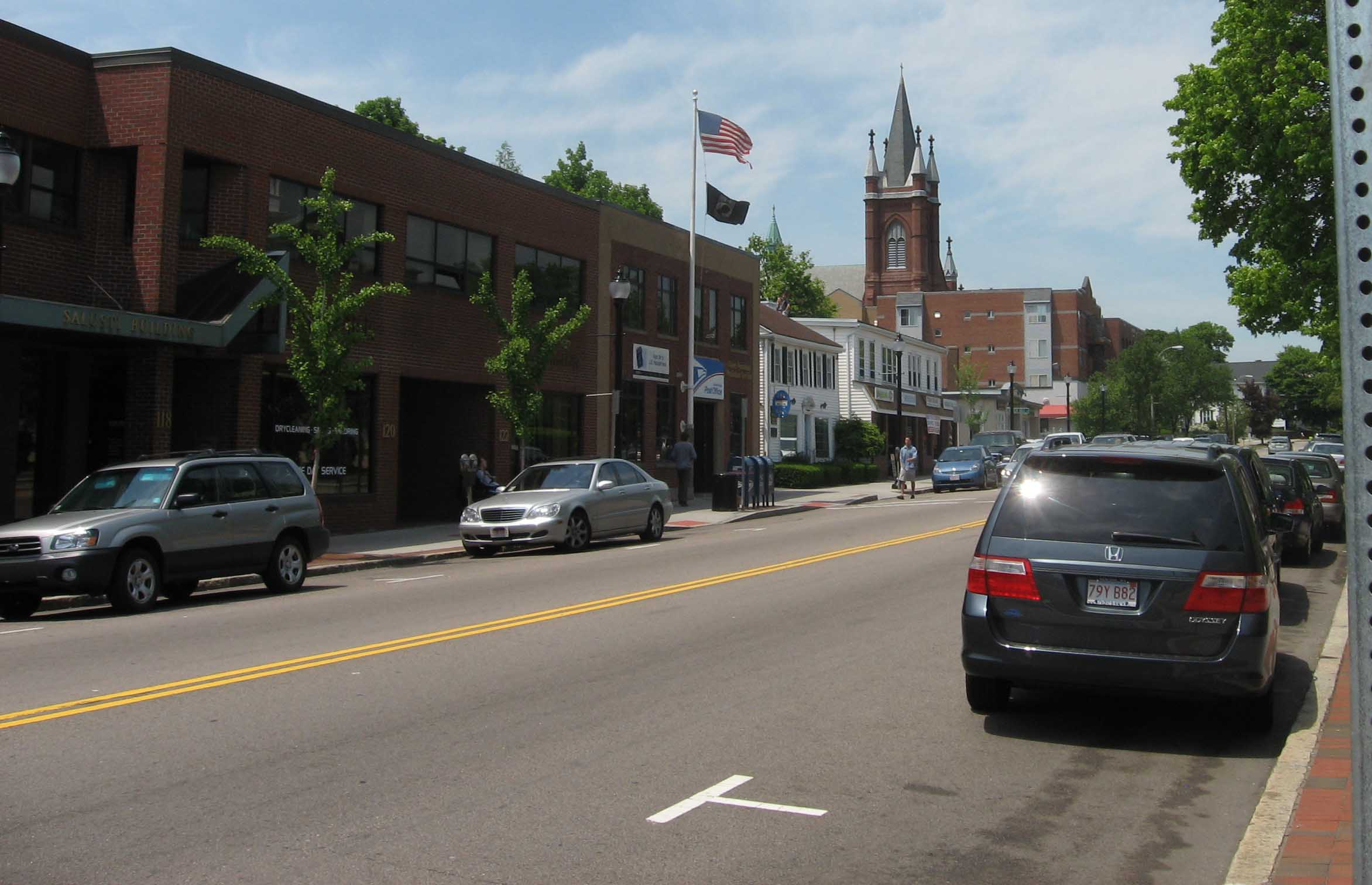
- Watertown's Main Street, facing westward

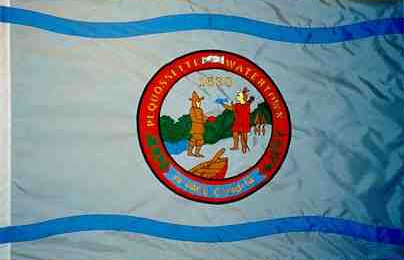
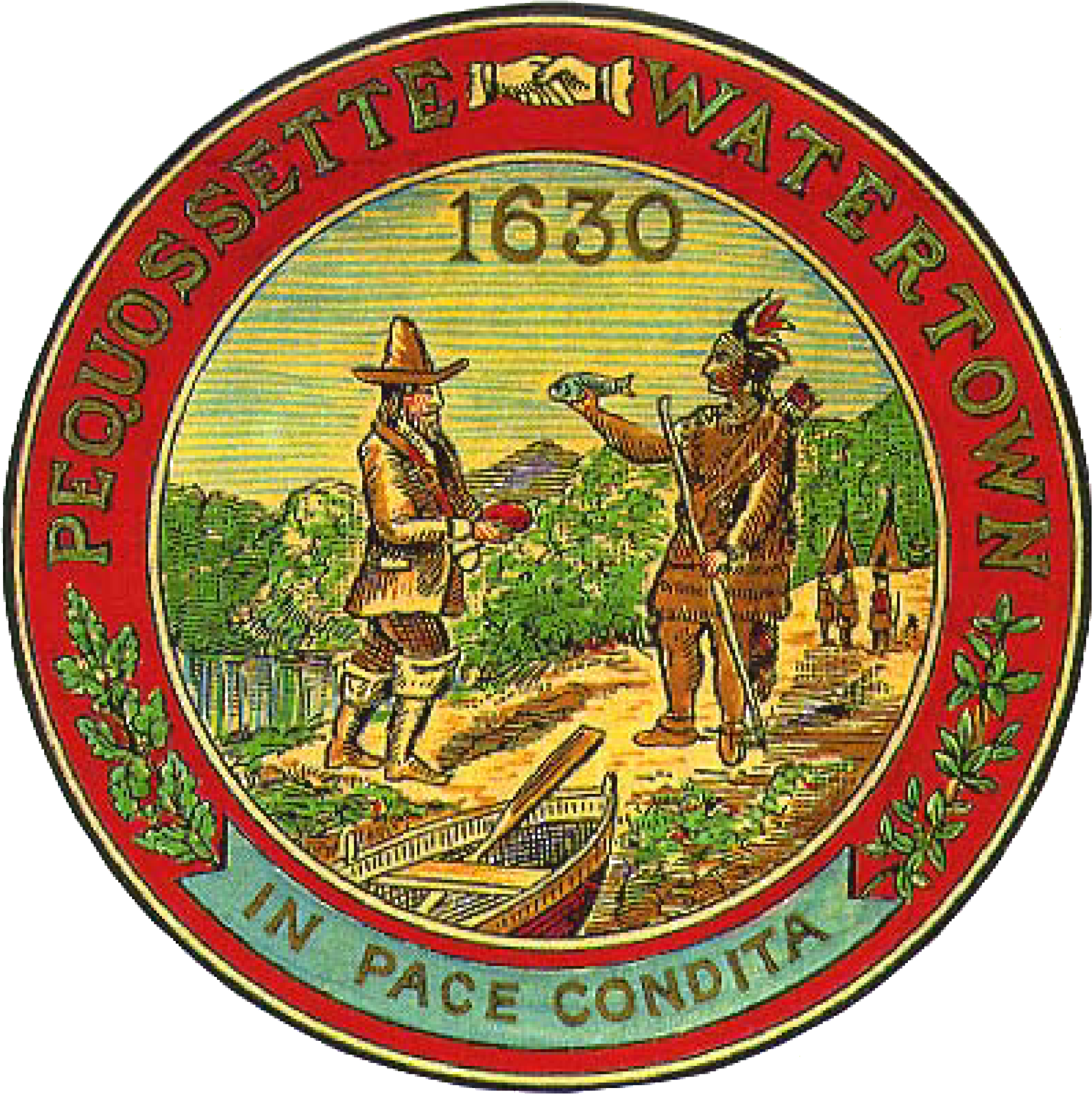
- Flag Seal
- Motto: In pace condita (Latin) "Founded in peace"
- Location in Middlesex County in Massachusetts

- Location within Greater Boston area Location within Massachusetts Location within the United States
- Coordinates: 42°22′15″N 71°11′00″W
- Country: United States
- State: Massachusetts
- County: Middlesex
- Settled: July 1630
- Incorporated: September 7, 1630

Government
  - Type: Council-manager
  - City Manager: George Proakis

Area
  - Total: 4.12 sq mi (10.68 km^{2})
  - Land: 4.00 sq mi (10.35 km^{2})
  - Water: 0.13 sq mi (0.33 km^{2})
- Elevation: 36 ft (11 m)

Population (2020)
  - Total: 35,329
  - Density: 8,840.7/sq mi (3,413.41/km^{2})
- Time zone: UTC−5 (Eastern)
  - Summer (DST): UTC−4 (Eastern)
- ZIP Code: 02472
- Area code: 617/857
- FIPS code: 25-73440
- GNIS feature ID: 0612401
- Website: www.watertown-ma.gov

Watertown is a city in Middlesex County, Massachusetts, United States, part of Greater Boston. The population was 35,329 in the 2020 census. Its neighborhoods include Bemis, Coolidge Square, East Watertown, Watertown Square, and the West End.

Watertown was one of the first Massachusetts Bay Colony settlements organized by Puritan settlers in 1630. The city is home to the Perkins School for the Blind, the Armenian Library and Museum of America, and the historic Watertown Arsenal, which produced military armaments from 1816 through World War II.

== History ==
Archeological evidence suggests that Watertown was inhabited for thousands of years before colonization. At the time of the earliest European reports in the 1600s, there were at least two important settlements of Massachusett people along the river later known as the Charles: Nonantum in present-day Newton, and Pequossette or Peguusset, "where the narrows open out" near modern-day Watertown Square. A contemporary English source lists "Pigsgusset" as the native name of "Water towne." Massachusett people built a fishing weir at Pequossette to trap herring at the site of the current Watertown Dam. The annual fish migration, as both alewife and blueback herring swim upstream from their adult home in the sea to spawn in the fresh water where they were hatched, still occurs every spring.

Watertown, first known to settlers as Saltonstall Plantation, was one of the earliest of the Massachusetts Bay Colony settlements. Founded in early 1630 by a group of settlers led by Richard Saltonstall and George Phillips, it was officially incorporated that same year. The alternate spelling "Waterton" is seen in some early documents.

The first buildings were upon land now included within the limits of Cambridge known as Gerry's Landing. For its first quarter century Watertown ranked next to Boston in population and area. Since then its limits have been greatly reduced. Thrice portions have been added to Cambridge, and it has contributed territory to form the new towns of Weston (1712), Waltham (1738), Lincoln (1754) and Belmont (1859). In 1632 the residents of Watertown protested against being compelled to pay a tax for the erection of a stockade fort at Cambridge; this was the first protest in America against taxation without representation and led to the establishment of representative democracy in the colony. As early as the close of the 17th century, Watertown was the chief horse and cattle market in New England and was known for its fertile gardens and fine estates. Here about 1632 was erected the first gristmill in the colony, and in 1662 one of the first woolen mills in America was built here. The first burying ground, on Arlington Street, was established in the 1660s. It contains a monument to Joseph Coolidge, the only Watertown resident killed during the British retreat from Concord in April 1775.

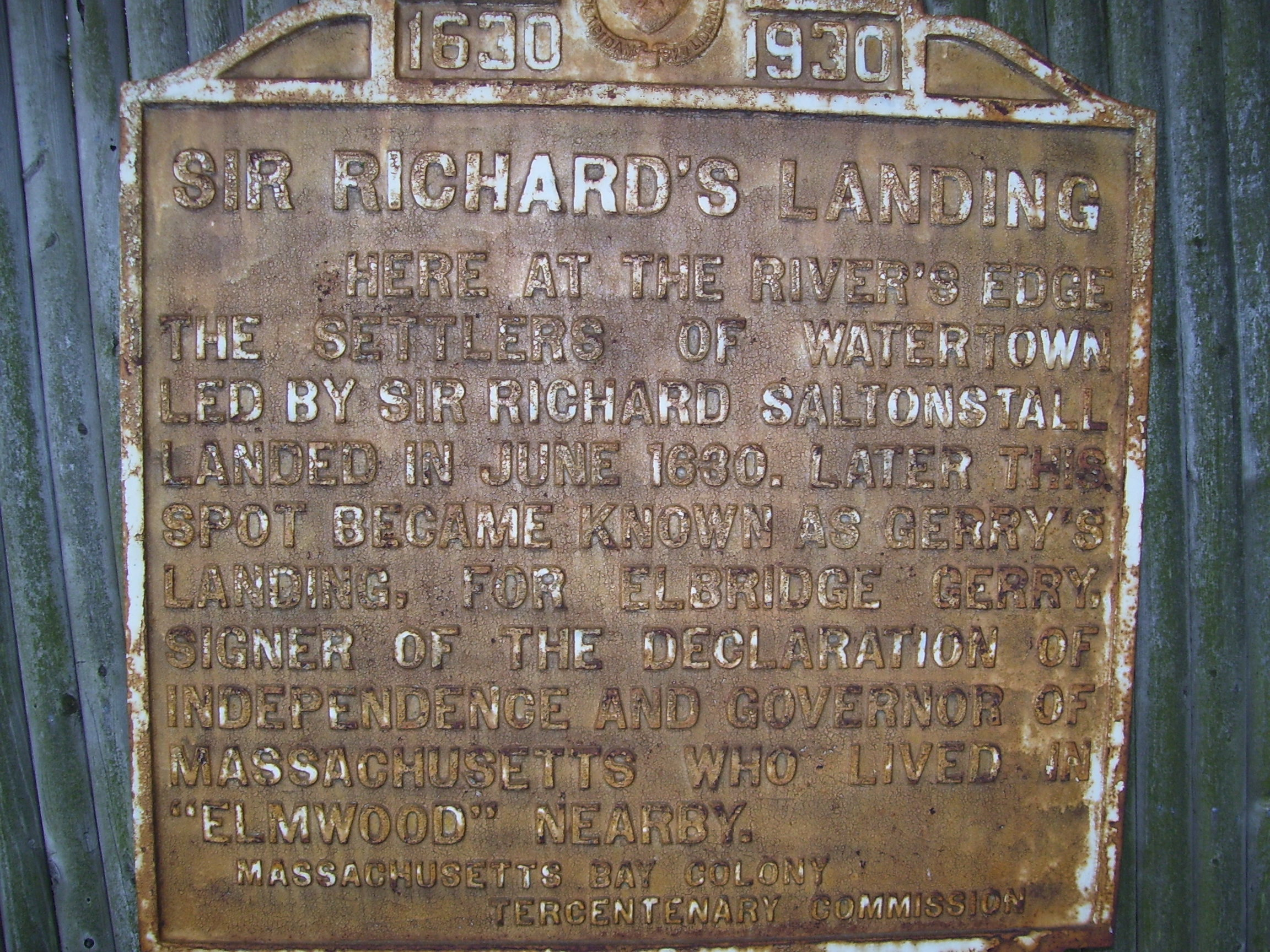
Saltonstall's landing spot in Watertown, also known as Elbridge Gerry Landing

=== Revolutionary War era ===
Much excitement was generated in Watertown towards the start of the American Revolutionary War period. In 1773, many of its citizens were engaged with the Sons of Liberty in another tax protest, this time against the British Tea Tax which resulted in the famous Boston Tea Party protest.

Then later (April 1775), some 134 Watertown minutemen responded to the alarm from Lexington to rout the British soldiers from their march to Concord. Thereafter many of these citizen soldiers were part of the first battle line formed at the Siege of Boston. Another Watertown citizen, Israel Bissell, was the first rider to take the news of the British attack and rode all the way to Connecticut, New York and Philadelphia.

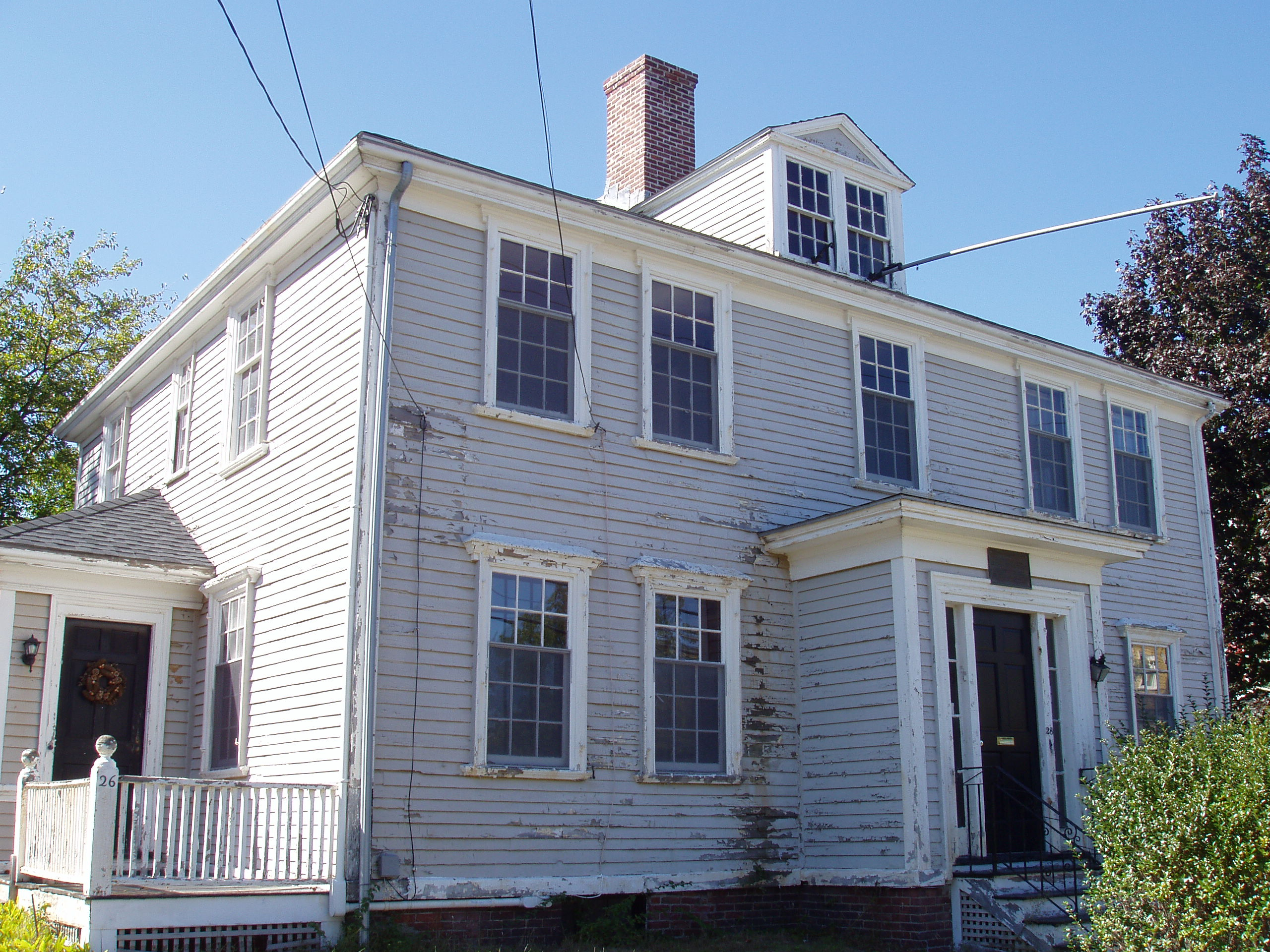
Edmund Fowle House, built in the 1700s and used by the Massachusetts government during the Revolutionary War

The Massachusetts Provincial Congress, after adjournment from Concord, met from April to July 1775 in the First Parish Church, the site of which is marked by a monument. On July 3, George Washington was greeted in Watertown; the following day he took command of the Army in Cambridge. The Massachusetts General Court held its sessions here from 1775 to 1778. Committees met in the nearby Edmund Fowle House. Boston town meetings were held here during the siege of Boston, when many Boston families made their homes in the neighborhood. For several months early in the American Revolution the committees of safety and committee of correspondence made Watertown their headquarters and it was from here that General Joseph Warren set out for Bunker Hill.

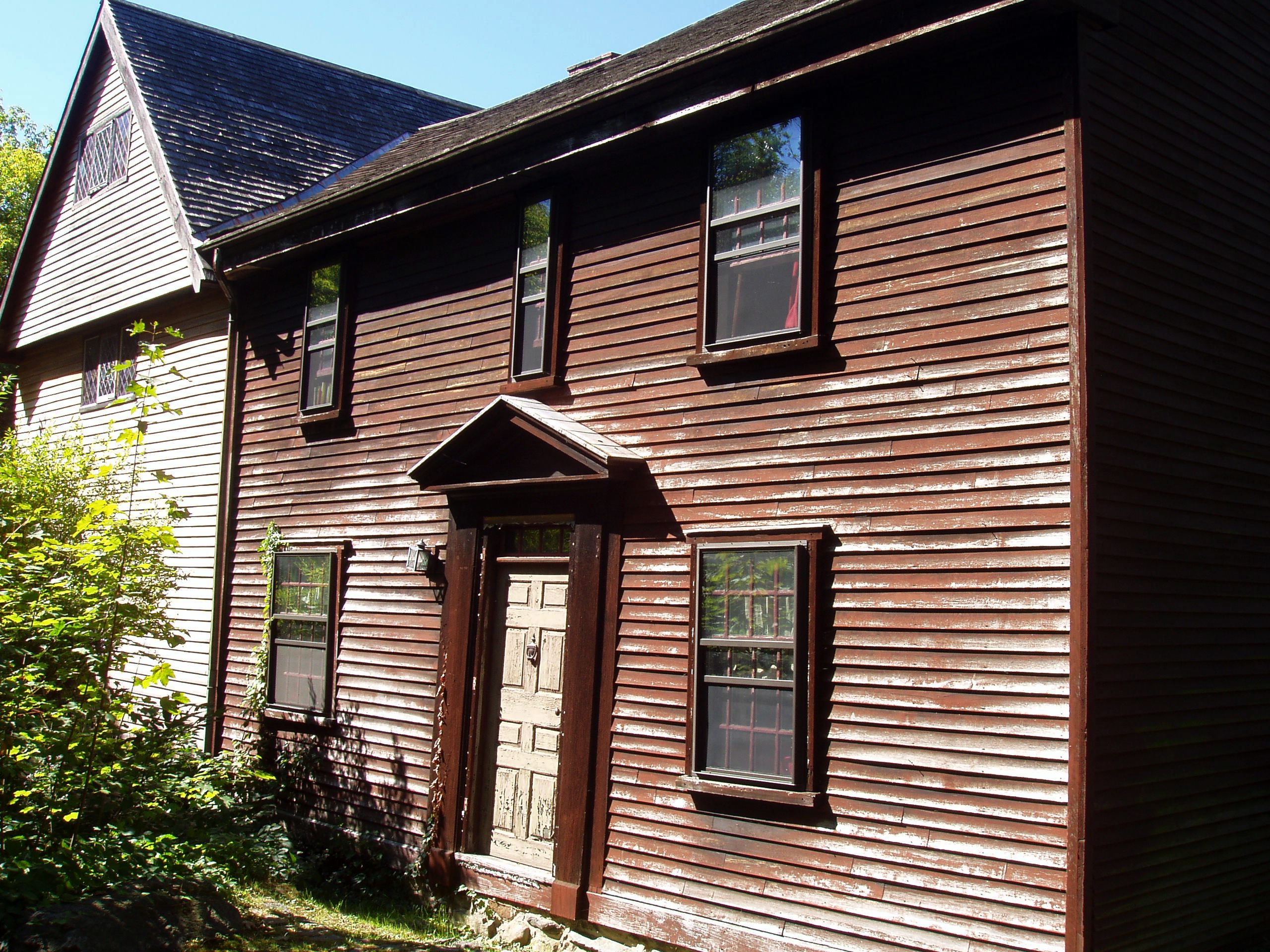
Browne House, built c. 1694

The Treaty of Watertown, the first treaty signed between the newly formed United States of America and a foreign power, the St. John's and Mi'kmaq First Nations of Nova Scotia, was signed in this house.

The Coolidge Tavern, built in 1742, was frequented by minutemen during the war. Here, Washington was entertained on his New England tour in 1789. The tavern was demolished in 1918 to make way for a trolley terminal.

=== Industrial era ===
From 1832 to 1834, Theodore Parker conducted a private school and his name is still preserved in the Parker School, though the building no longer operates as a public school.

Mount Auburn Cemetery was founded in 1831, creating the first garden cemetery in the United States. The landscape of Mount Auburn provided inspiration for the nation's first public parks and picturesque suburbs designed by the early generations of American landscape architects. Mount Auburn has been recognized as one of the most significant designed landscapes in the country. Although perceived as a Cambridge institution, almost all of the cemetery is actually in Watertown.

The Watertown Arsenal operated continuously as a military munitions and research facility from 1816 until 1995, when the Army sold the property, by then known as the Army Materials Technology Laboratory, to the town of Watertown. The Arsenal is notable for being the site of a 1911 strike prompted by the management methods of operations research pioneer Frederick Winslow Taylor (Taylor and 1911 Watertown Arsenal Strike). Taylor's method, which he dubbed "Scientific Management," broke tasks down into smaller components. Workers no longer completed whole items; instead, they were timed using stopwatches as they did small tasks repetitively, as Taylor attempted to find the balance of tasks that resulted in the maximum output from workers. The strike and its causes were controversial enough that they resulted in Congressional hearings in 1911; Congress passed a law in 1915 banning the method in government-owned arsenals. Taylor's methods spread widely, influencing such industrialists as Henry Ford, and the idea is one of the underlying inspirations of the factory (assembly) line industrial method. The Watertown Arsenal was the site of a major superfund cleanup in the 1990s, and has now become a center for shopping, dining and the arts, with the opening of several restaurants and a new theatre. The site includes the Arsenal Center for the Arts, a regional arts center that opened in 2005. The Arsenal was owned by the electronic health record system maker athenahealth, until it was sold to Alexandria Real Estate Equities in 2019, adding to the life science focused development along Arsenal Street. Arsenal Street features two shopping malls across the street from one another, with the Watertown Mall on one side and Arsenal Yards on the other.

The Stanley Brothers built the first of their steam-powered cars, which came to be known as Stanley Steamers, in Watertown in 1897.

The Locomobile Company of America, founded in 1899, also produced steam-powered cars in Watertown until the company moved to Bridgeport, Connecticut.

=== 21st century ===
Shortly after midnight of April 18–19, 2013, the two suspects in the Boston Marathon bombing engaged in a protracted battle with police, in Watertown involving the use of firearms and explosives. Tamerlan Tsarnaev was critically wounded and later pronounced dead and the town was completely locked down for hours as police, FBI, and Army National Guard personnel patrolled it, looking for the remaining suspect, Dzhokhar Tsarnaev, who was captured wounded but alive in a boat shortly after the lockdown ended on the following evening.

In the November 2021 election, the citizens voted to amend the official name of the city to "The City of Watertown" (from "The City Known as the Town of Watertown").

== Geography ==
Watertown is located at 42°22′17″N 71°10′55″W (42.37139, −71.18194). To the north, it is bordered by the town of Belmont, along Belmont Street; to the south, it is bordered by the city of Newton. The city of Boston's Brighton neighborhood also lies to the south and east—the border being largely formed by the Charles River. Though the majority of the town lies north of the Charles, from Watertown Square, the nexus of the town, the town's border extends south of the Charles to encompass the neighborhood surrounding Casey Playground. To the east lies the City of Cambridge, the border to which is almost entirely the well-known Mount Auburn Cemetery, most of which is actually in Watertown. To the west lies the more expansive city of Waltham, but there is no distinct geographic feature or major road dividing the two municipalities.

According to the United States Census Bureau, the city has a total area of 4.2 square miles (11 km^{2}), of which 4.1 square miles (11 km^{2}) is land and 0.1 square miles (0.1 km^{2} or 1.20%) is water.

== Demographics ==
Historical population
Year	Pop.	±%
1790	1,091	—
1840	1,810	+65.9%
1850	2,837	+56.7%
1860	3,270	+15.3%
1870	4,326	+32.3%
1880	5,426	+25.4%
1890	7,073	+30.4%
1900	9,766	+38.1%
1910	12,875	+31.8%
1920	21,457	+66.7%
1930	34,913	+62.7%
1940	35,427	+1.5%
1950	37,329	+5.4%
1960	39,092	+4.7%
1970	39,307	+0.5%
1980	34,384	−12.5%
1990	33,284	−3.2%
2000	32,986	−0.9%
2010	31,915	−3.2%
2020	35,329	+10.7%
2024*	35,985	+1.9%
* = population estimate. Source: United States census records and Population Estimates Program data. Source: U.S. Decennial Census

As of the census of 2000, there were 32,986 people, 14,629 households, and 7,329 families residing in the city. The population density was 8,025.7 inhabitants per square mile (3,098.7/km^{2}). There were 15,008 housing units at an average density of 3,651.5 per square mile (1,409.9/km^{2}). The racial makeup of the city was 91.42% White, 1.73% African American, 0.16% Native American, 3.87% Asian, 0.02% Pacific Islander, 0.85% from other races, and 1.95% from two or more races. Hispanic or Latino of any race were 2.68% of the population.

There were 14,629 households, out of which 17.8% had children under the age of 18 living with them, 37.9% were married couples living together, 8.7% had a female householder with no husband present, and 49.9% were non-families. 34.1% of all households were made up of individuals, and 12.4% had someone living alone who was 65 years of age or older. The average household size was 2.17 and the average family size was 2.86.

In the city, the population was spread out, with 14.1% under the age of 18, 9.4% from 18 to 24, 39.8% from 25 to 44, 20.0% from 45 to 64, and 16.7% who were 65 years of age or older. The median age was 37 years. For every 100 females, there were 86.1 males. For every 100 females age 18 and over, there were 83.8 males.

The median income for a household in the city was $59,764, and the median income for a family was $67,441. Males had a median income of $46,642 versus $39,840 for females. The per capita income for the city was $33,262. About 4.5% of families and 6.3% of the population were below the poverty line, including 8.6% of those under age 18 and 7.5% of those age 65 or over.

=== Armenian population ===
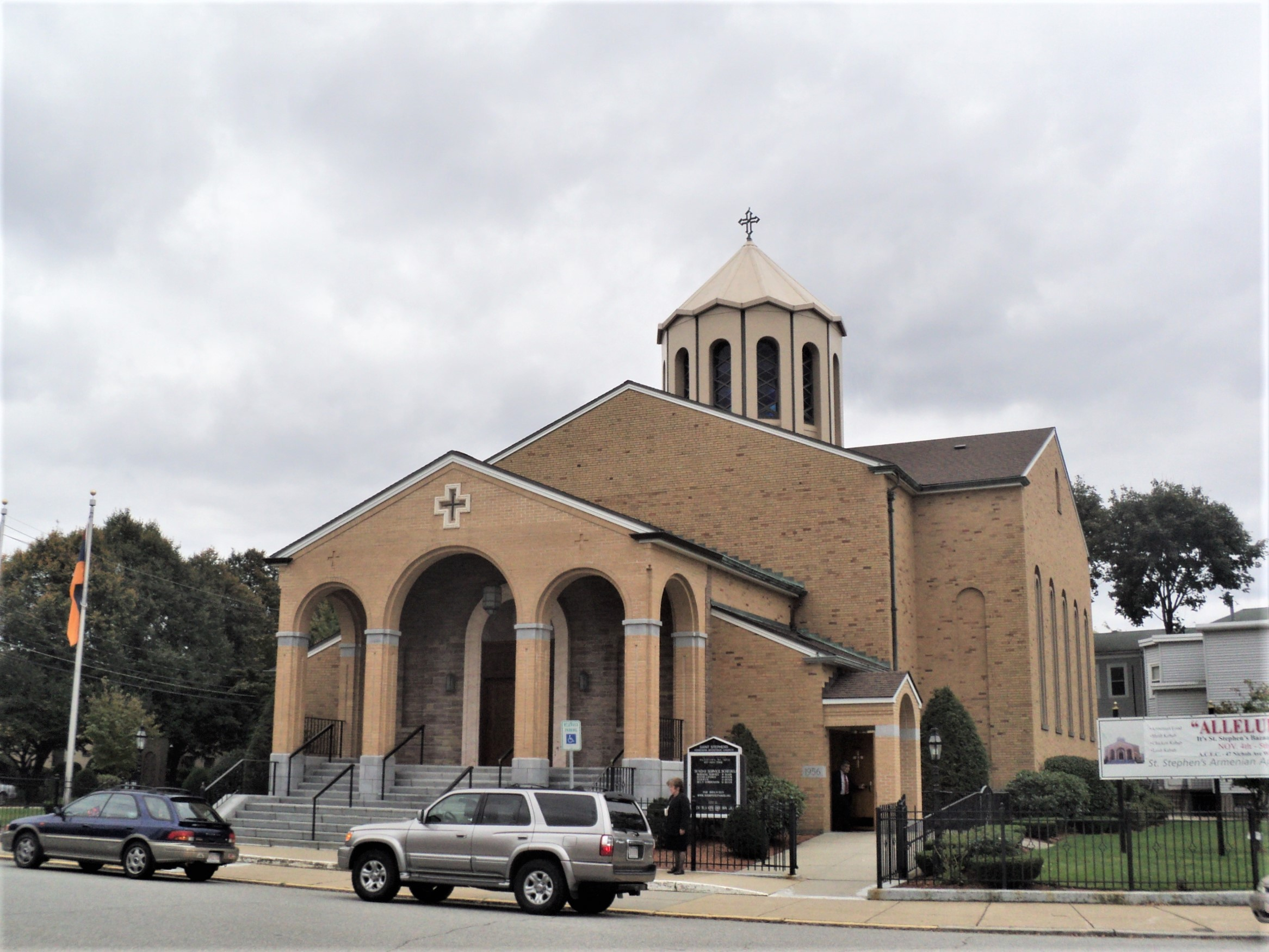
St. Stephen Armenian Apostolic Church

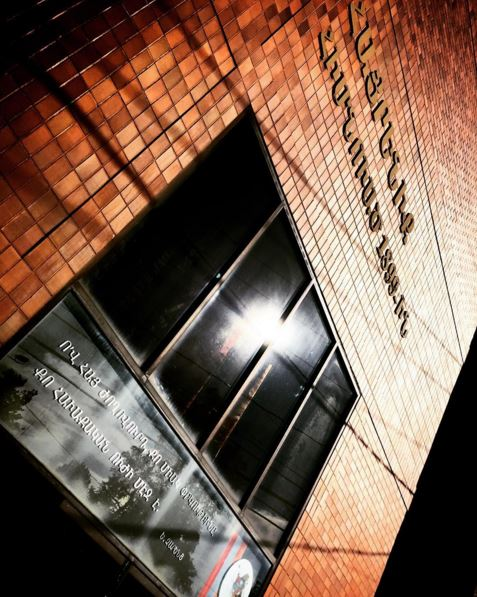
Hairenik Association building – Watertown, Mass.

Watertown is a major center of the Armenian diaspora in the United States, with the third-largest Armenian community in the United States, estimated as numbering 7,000 to over 8,000 as of 2007. Watertown ranks only behind the California cities of Glendale and Fresno. Watertown is also the venue for the publication of long-running Armenian newspapers in English and Armenian, including:

- Baikar Association Inc.'s
  - Armenian Mirror-Spectator
  - Baikar
- Hairenik Association Inc.'s
  - Armenian Weekly
  - Հայրենիք (Hairenik Weekly)
  - Armenian Review
  - Hairenik Association also runs a web radio and a web TV station.

Several Armenian grocery stores are found in East Watertown that sell produce and imported Armenian and Mediterranean products.

== Economy ==
Major employers based in Watertown include the Tufts Health Plan, New England Sports Network, the Perkins School for the Blind, Exergen Corporation, Vanasse Hangen Brustlin, Inc., and athenahealth.

== Transportation ==
Watertown borders Soldiers Field Road and the Massachusetts Turnpike, major arteries into downtown Boston. Watertown is served by several MBTA bus and formerly trackless trolley routes. Most of them pass through or terminate in Watertown Square or Watertown Yard. The former A-Watertown branch of the MBTA's Green Line ran to Watertown until 1969.

== Parks and recreation ==
Arsenal park is a public park in Watertown, Massachusetts. The park took on renovations that were completed in 2025. Improvement in this park made more space for recreational facilities and updated public spaces.

== Education ==
Public schooling is provided for approximately 2,600 students by Watertown Public Schools, which operates three elementary schools, one middle school, and one high school (Watertown High School).

Private day schools:

- Perkins School
- St. Stephen's Armenian Elementary School
- Atrium School

There is also a supplementary Armenian language school, St. James Erebuni Armenian School (Armenian: Սբ. Հակոբ Էրեբունի հայկական դպրոց), affiliated with the St. James Armenian Apostolic Church, which teaches both Western Armenian and Eastern Armenian to children. It originated as a solely Eastern Armenian supplementary school established in 1988 by the Armenian Society of Boston (Iranahye Miutyun); it was Greater Boston's first Eastern Armenian supplementary school. It became church-affiliated in 2015, and it merged with a Western Armenian school, St. Sahag & St. Mesrob Armenian School, in September of that year.

== Notable people ==
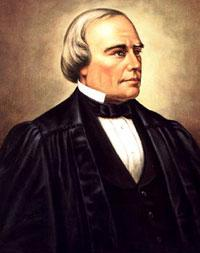
Benjamin Robbins Curtis

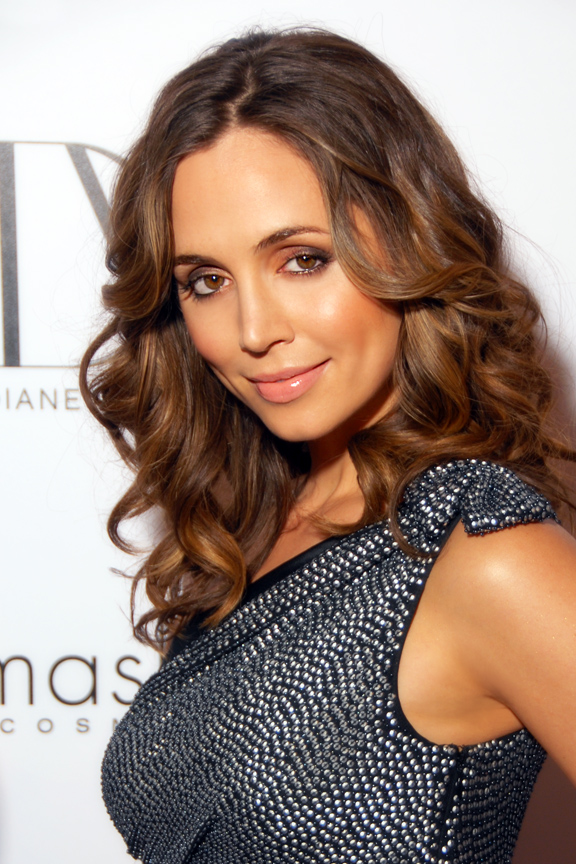
Eliza Dushku

- George Bachrach, state senator representing Greater Boston Area; Democratic candidate for governor in 1994 and 1998
- Richard Bakalyan (1931–2015), actor
- Bertha Isabelle Barker (1868–1963), bacteriologist
- Outram Bangs (1863–1932), zoologist
- Seth Bemis (1775–1851), industrialist and entrepreneur
- Hampartzoum Berberian (1905–1999), Armenian composer
- Anna Bingham (1745–1829), businesswoman and innkeeper
- Charles Brigham (1841–1925), nationally known architect and designer of the Watertown town seal
- Benjamin Robbins Curtis (1809–1874), American jurist. Dissented in the Dred Scott case and defended Andrew Johnson during the president's impeachment trial
- Frederick C. Crawford (1891–1994), American industrialist, founder of TRW and Crawford Auto-Aviation Museum
- Jeff DaRosa (born 1982), musician, member of Dropkick Murphys and former member of the Exit
- James DeMarco (born 1968), artist and cartoonist
- Eliza Dushku (born 1980), film and TV actress, grew up in Watertown and graduated from Watertown High School
- Convers Francis (1795–1863), minister ordained at the Watertown Unitarian Church, who, along with Ralph Waldo Emerson, Henry David Thoreau and others, had an important role in transcendentalism
- Eugene Goodheart (1931–2020), literary critic at Brandeis University
- Arshile Gorky (born Vostanik Manoug Adoian, 1904–1948), Armenian-American painter who had a seminal influence on Abstract Expressionism, lived in Watertown in the 1920s.
- Thomas Hastings (colonist) (c. 1605–1685), English immigrant ancestor of Rev. Theodore Parker, among others
- Charles Foster Hathaway, founder of C.F. Hathaway Company shirt company
- Harriet Hosmer (painter and sculptor), (1830–1908) known as the first female professional sculptor
- Noah Kahan (artist and songwriter), (1997–present) known for his breakout 2022 album Stick Season. A Vermont native, Kahan moved to Watertown in July 2022. He references the city in songs such as "Orbiter" and "Pain is Cold Water"
- Drastamat Kanayan, better known as Dro (Դրօ), was an Armenian military commander and politician, a member of the Armenian Revolutionary Federation. He served as Defense Minister of Armenia in 1920, during the country's brief independence. Dro died in Watertown on March 8, 1956, and was buried at Mount Auburn Cemetery
- Rachel Kaprielian, former head of Massachusetts Registry of Motor Vehicles, and former state representative
- Hakob Karapents (1925–1994), Iranian-Armenian writer
- Helen Keller (1880–1968), attended the Perkins Institute for the Blind
- Tim Kurkjian, Major League Baseball analyst on ESPN
- Nancy Masterton, Maine state representative
- Thomas Mayhew, early settler and Governor of Martha's Vineyard, Nantucket and adjacent islands
- Ross Miner (born 1991), skating coach and retired competitive figure skater
- Stephen P. Mugar (1901–1982), founder of Star Market, philanthropist
- John Oldham (1592–1636), early Puritan settler
- Charles Pratt (1830–1891), wealthy oil industry pioneer and philanthropist
- Thomas Reilly, Massachusetts attorney general (1999–2007)
- Robert Seeley (1602–1668), co-founder of Watertown, landowner
- Joe Seiders, musician, drummer for the rock band The New Pornographers
- Charles Sumner Tainter (1854–1940), inventor, associate, and nephew of Alexander Graham Bell
- Warren Tolman, Democratic candidate for lieutenant governor in 1998, governor in 2002, and attorney general in 2014
- Tui T. Sutherland, author of Wings of Fire
- Steven Van Zandt (born 1950), guitarist of Springsteen's E Street Band, actor from The Sopranos, lived at 16 Edgecliff Road until the age of seven

== Culture ==
- Armenian Library and Museum of America at 65 Main Street in the former Coolidge Bank building
- Hairenik Association at 80 Bigelow Avenue
- Perkins Braille and Talking Book Library, on the campus of the Perkins School for the Blind
- Watertown Free Public Library at 123 Main Street, in a newly renovated and expanded building
- The Mosesian Center for the Arts is a regional arts center located in the former US Army Arsenal along the Charles River. Offerings include visual and performing arts productions, classes, and workshops for all ages, literary/art discussions, and world-class theatrical and musical performances.
- New Repertory Theatre is the resident professional theatre company at the Mosesian Center for the Arts, 321 Arsenal Street
- The Watertown Children's Theatre at the Mosesian Center for the Arts has been offering classes and productions for children in the area for 35 years.
- The Plumbing Museum, located at 80 Rosedale Road in a former ice house next to the J.C. Cannistraro corporate offices. (Temporarily closed while searching for a new location.)
- The Edmund Fowle House (1772) and Museum, at 28 Marshall St., the second oldest surviving house in Watertown (after the Browne House), later moved to its present location and remodeled by Charles Brigham.
- The Abraham Browne House (built c. 1694–1701) is a colonial house located at 562 Main Street. It is now a nonprofit museum operated by Historic New England and open to the public two afternoons a year.
- Mount Auburn Cemetery, founded in 1831, consists of 151.1 acres of well-manicured grounds with numerous species of both indigenous and exotic tree and shrub species. It is Watertown's largest contiguous open space and extends into Cambridge to the east. It also features the George Washington Tower. Parking is available for visitors.
- Gore Place is an early 19th-century historic house museum and National Historic Landmark in Waltham, Massachusetts, with 31.6 acres of the 45-acre estate located in Watertown.
- The Watertown Arsenal was a major American arsenal located on the northern shore of the Charles River in Watertown. Its site is now registered on the ASCE's List of Historic Civil Engineering Landmarks and on the U.S. National Register of Historic Places.

== See also ==
- Greater Boston
- Town council
- Robert Seeley
- Watertown Branch Railroad
- Armenian Americans in Massachusetts
