= Head of the Charles Regatta =

Rowing race on the Charles River, Boston/Cambridge

Coordinates: 42°21′45″N 71°7′1″W

- Date: Penultimate Weekend of October
- Location: Boston, Massachusetts, U.S.
- Event type: Head race
- Distance: 3 miles (4.8 km)
- Primary sponsor: BNY Mellon
- Established: 1965
- Website: www.hocr.org
- Participants: 2,271 entries; 790 clubs

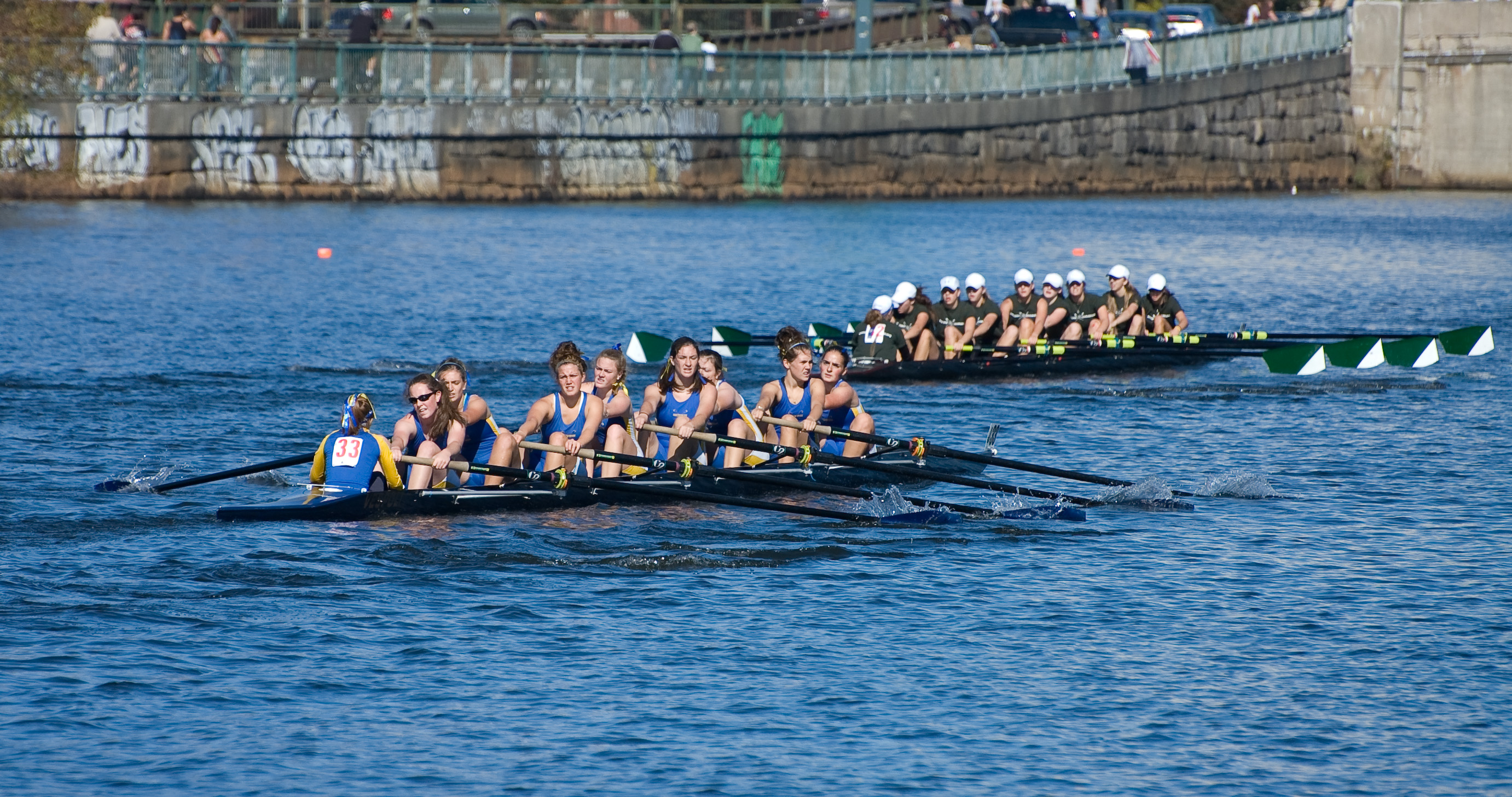
The Middlebury College rowing team in the 2007 Regatta.

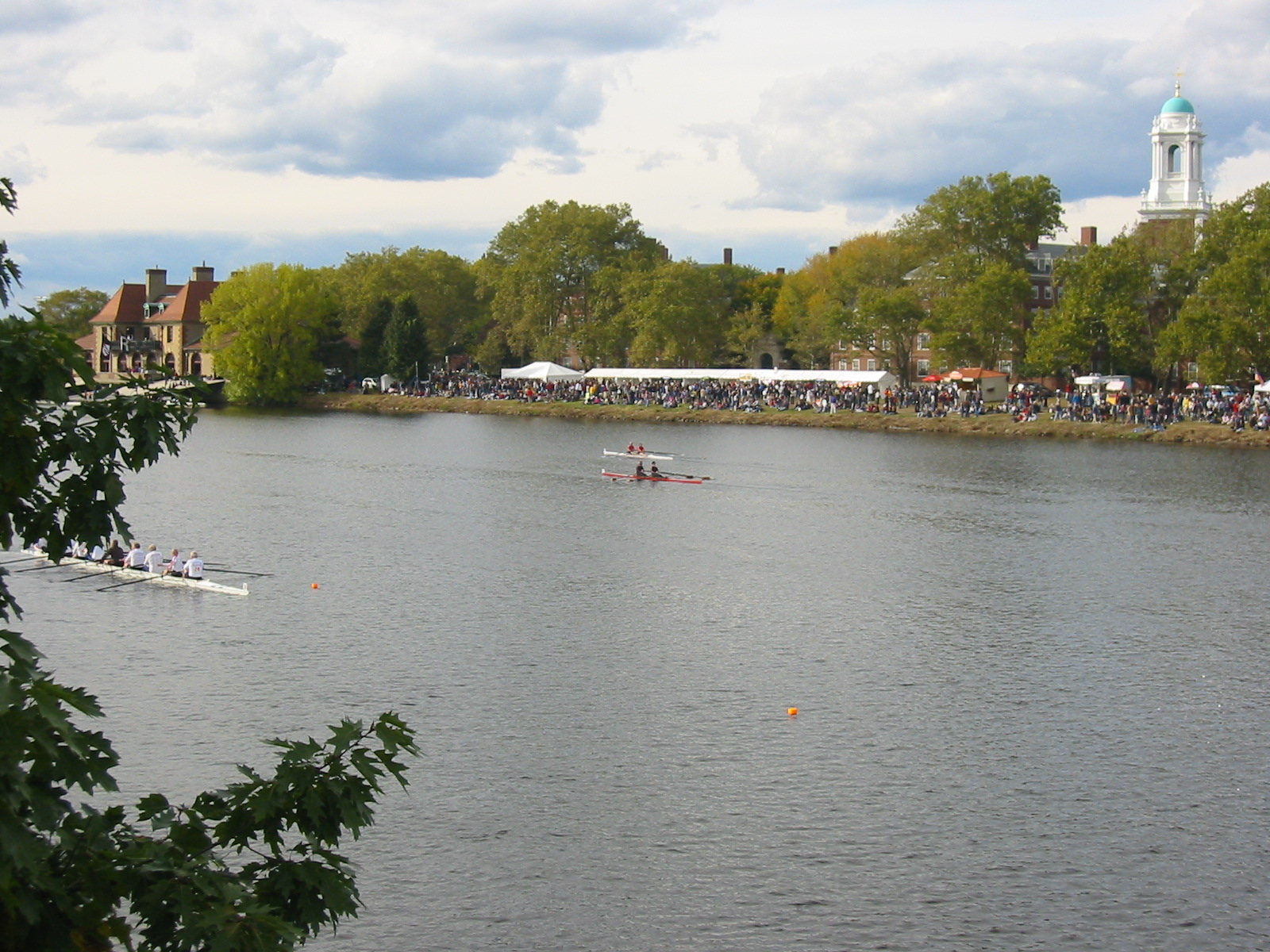
Spectators lining the bank of the Charles River in 2003

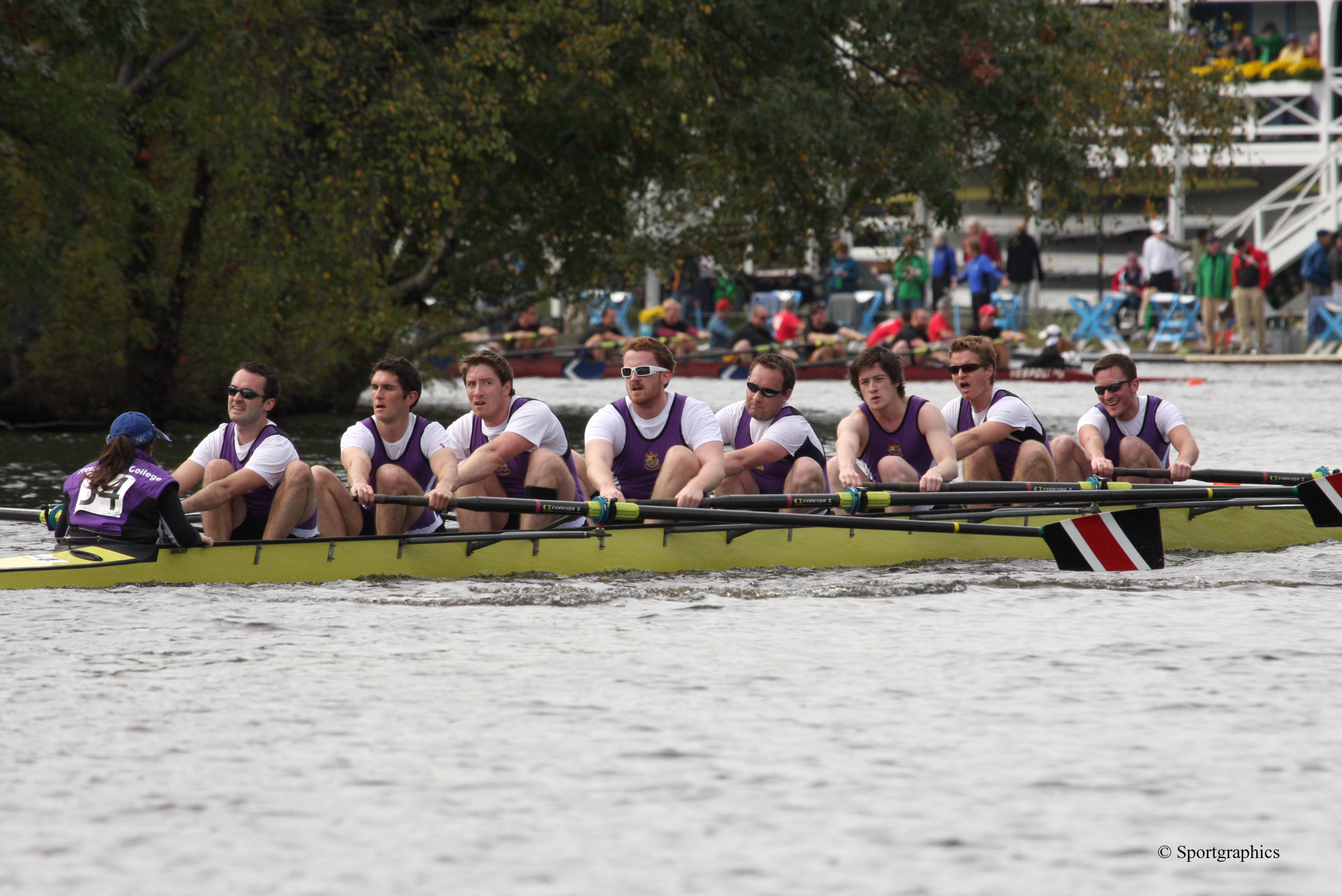
Presentation Brothers College, Irish crew, competing in Alumni 8 in 2011.

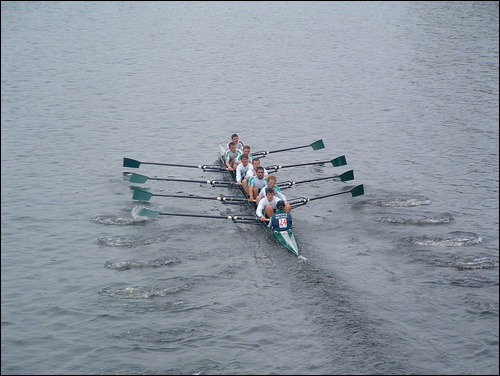
Queen's University Belfast, a crew from Northern Ireland, racing in the Head of the Charles in 2003

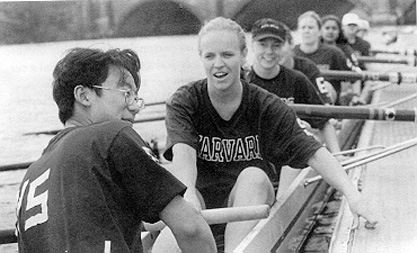
Kennedy School women's team outside the Weld Boathouse preparing to row the Head of the Charles in 1996, though that year the race was cancelled due to bad weather.

The Head of the Charles Regatta, also known as HOCR, is a rowing head race held on the penultimate complete weekend of October (i.e., on the Friday that falls between the 16th and the 22nd of the month, and on the Saturday and Sunday immediately afterwards) each year on the Charles River, which separates Boston and Cambridge, Massachusetts, United States. It is the largest 3-day regatta in the world, with 11,000 athletes rowing in over 2,500 boats in 73 events. According to the Greater Boston Convention & Visitors Bureau, the three-day event brings 225,000 people to the Greater Boston area and $72 million to the local economy.

The last races of the Regatta are generally the most prestigious: Championship 4s, and Championship 8s (both men and women). Championship sculling events (1x/single and 2x/double) race on Saturday afternoon. The Championship events usually include U.S. National Team athletes, as well as national team athletes from other top rowing nations.

The competitive field includes individual and team competitors from colleges, high schools, and clubs from nearly all American states and various countries. The 2006 field included rowers from China, South Africa, Croatia, Ireland, and the Netherlands. The age of athletes spans from 14 to 85 years old with experience levels from novice to Olympic. In 2007, approximately 10% of the field was international.

Regattas such as the Head of the Charles in Boston and the Head of the Schuylkill in Philadelphia are to the rowing world what the New York City Marathon and the Boston Marathon are to running.

— Susan Saint Sing, The Eight: A Season in the Tradition of Harvard Crew

== Course ==
The course is three miles (4,800 meters) long and stretches from the start at Boston University's DeWolfe Boathouse near the Charles River Basin to the finish just after the Eliot Bridge and before Northeastern University's Henderson Boathouse. The course is renowned for being challenging for crews to navigate without incident or penalty. The course contains six bridges, which appear in this order from the start:

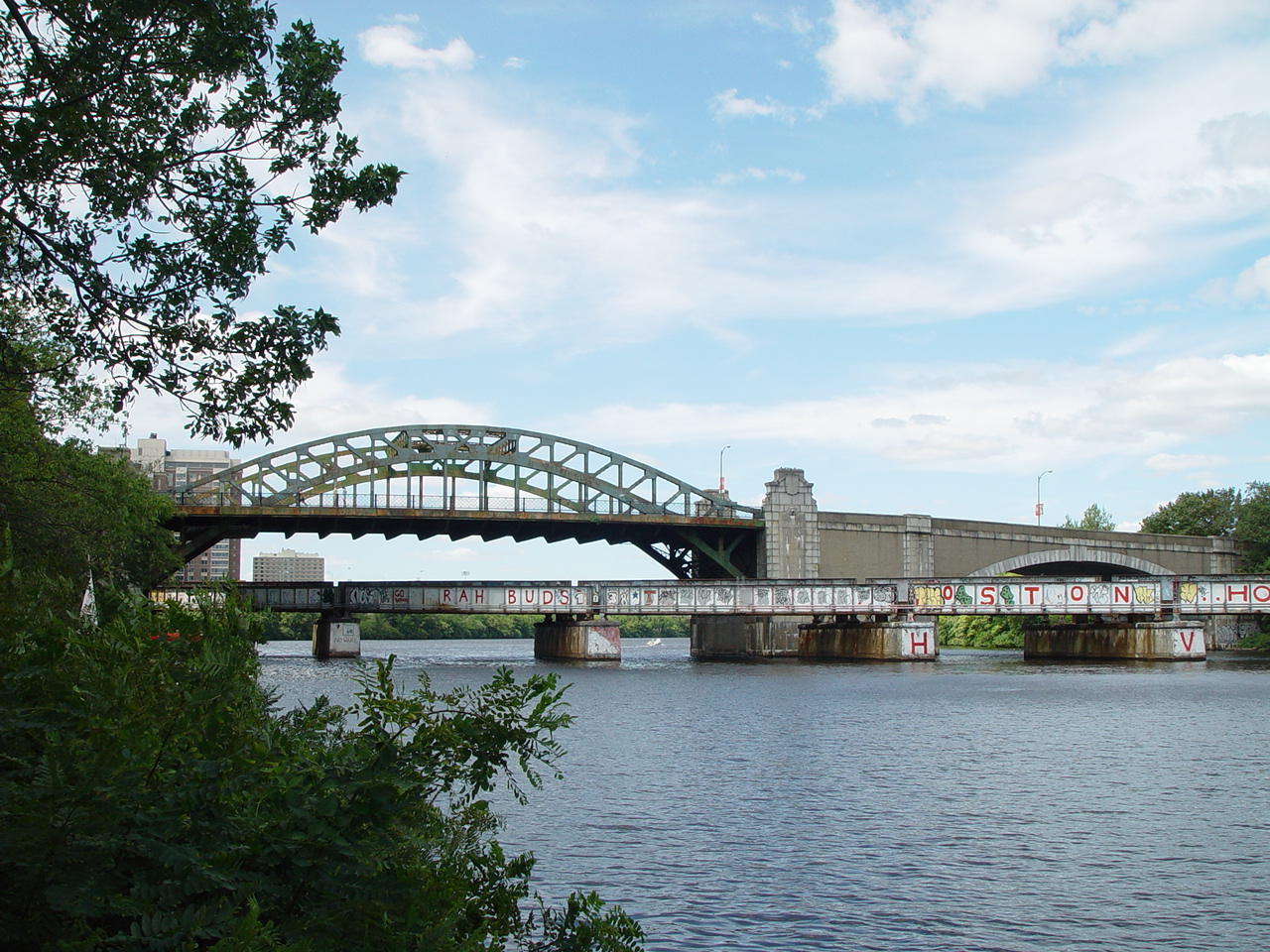
Boston University/Grand Junction Railroad Bridges

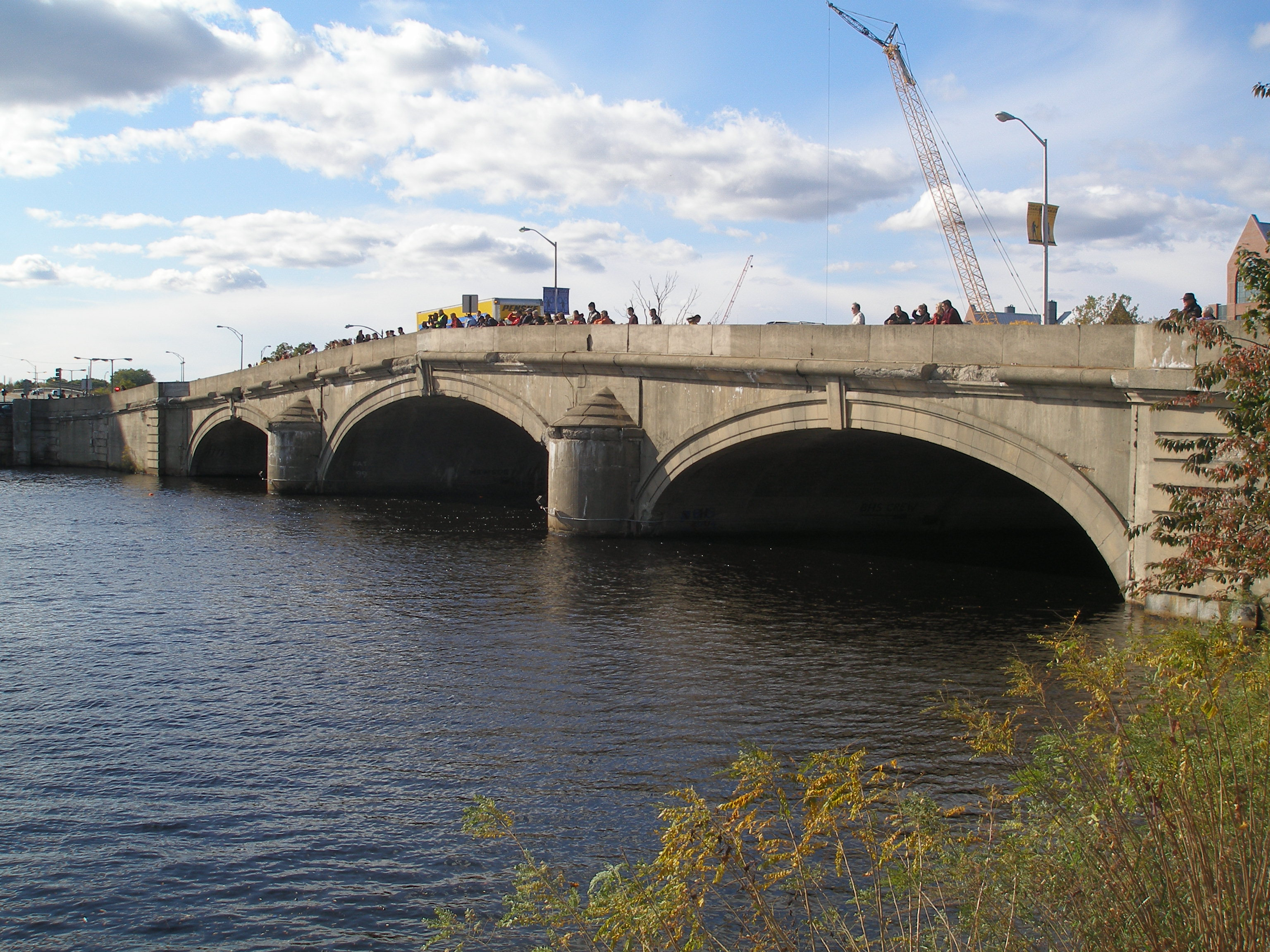
River Street Bridge

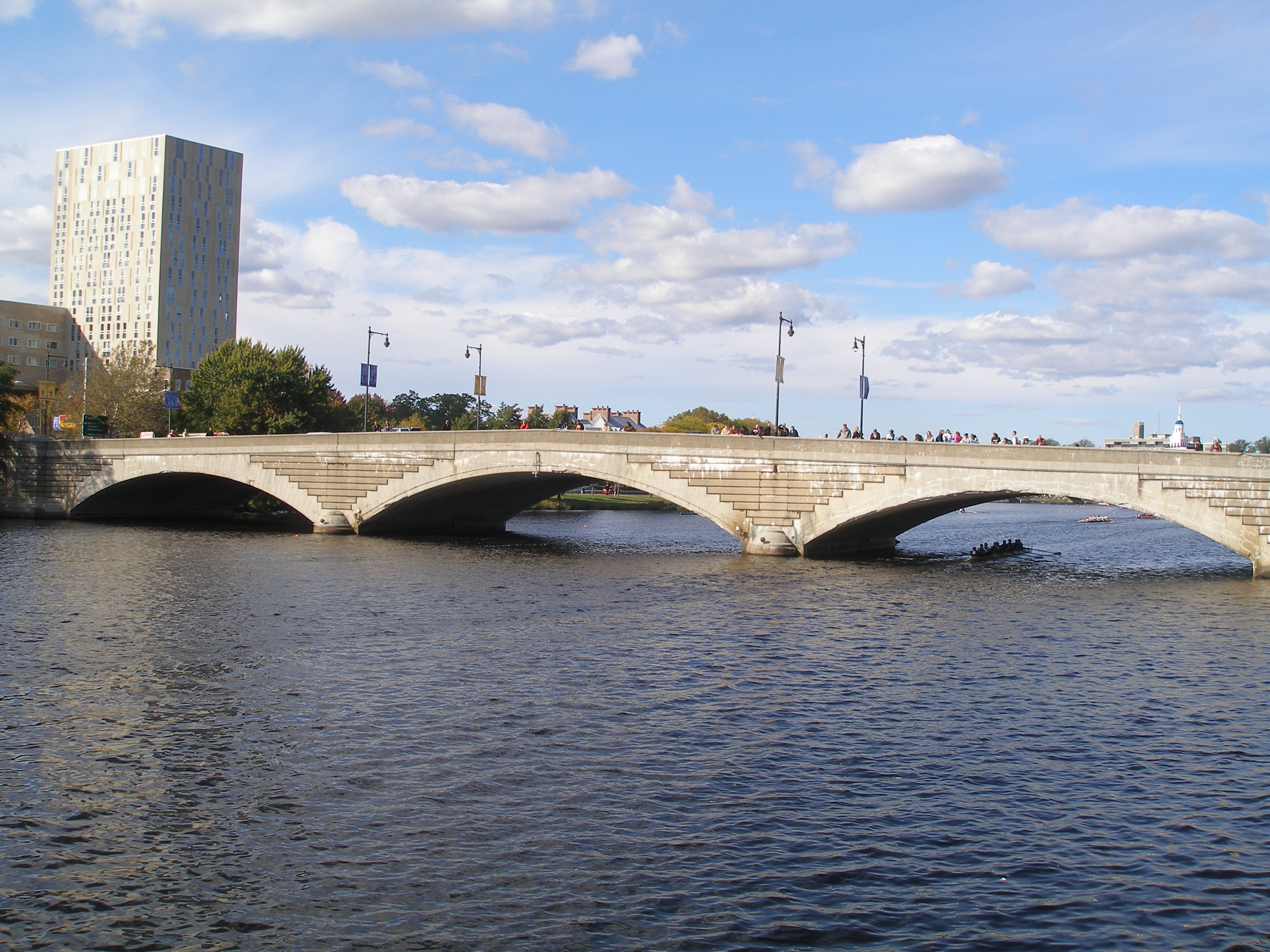
Western Avenue Bridge

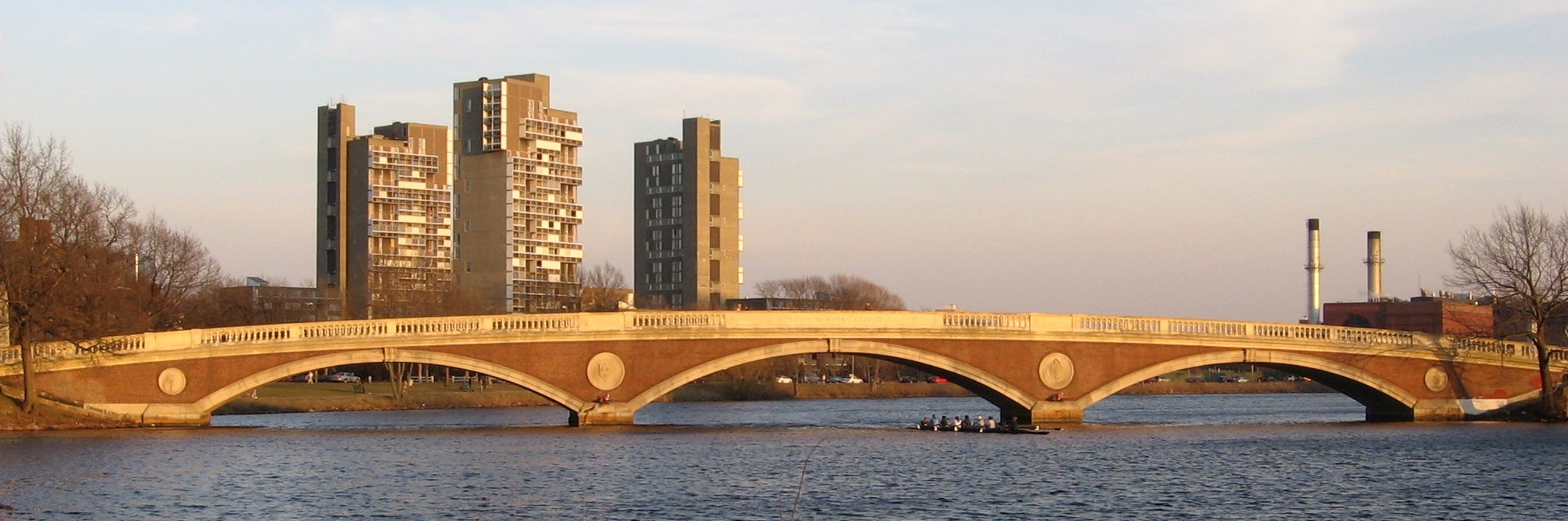
John W. Weeks Footbridge

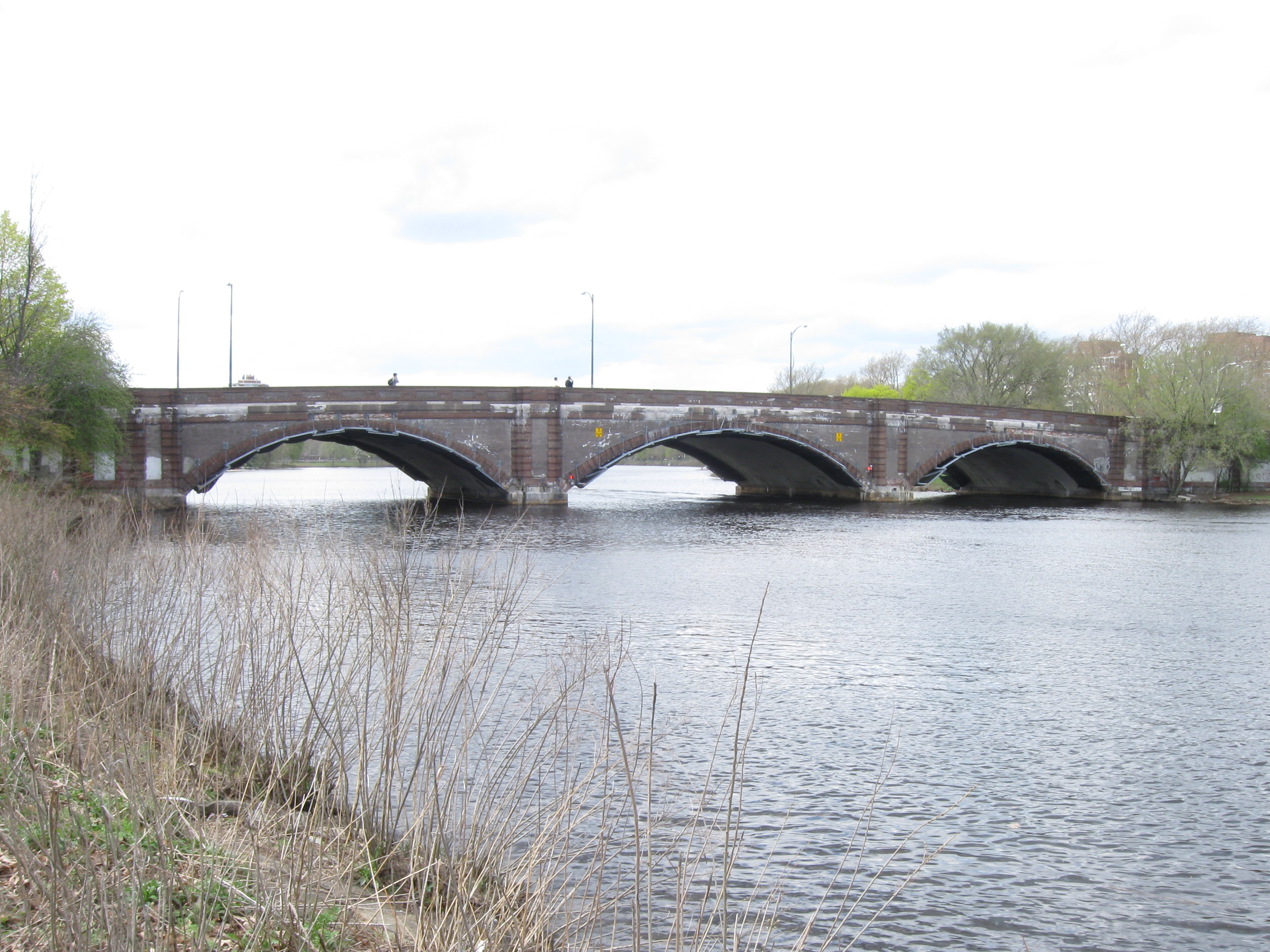
Anderson Memorial Bridge

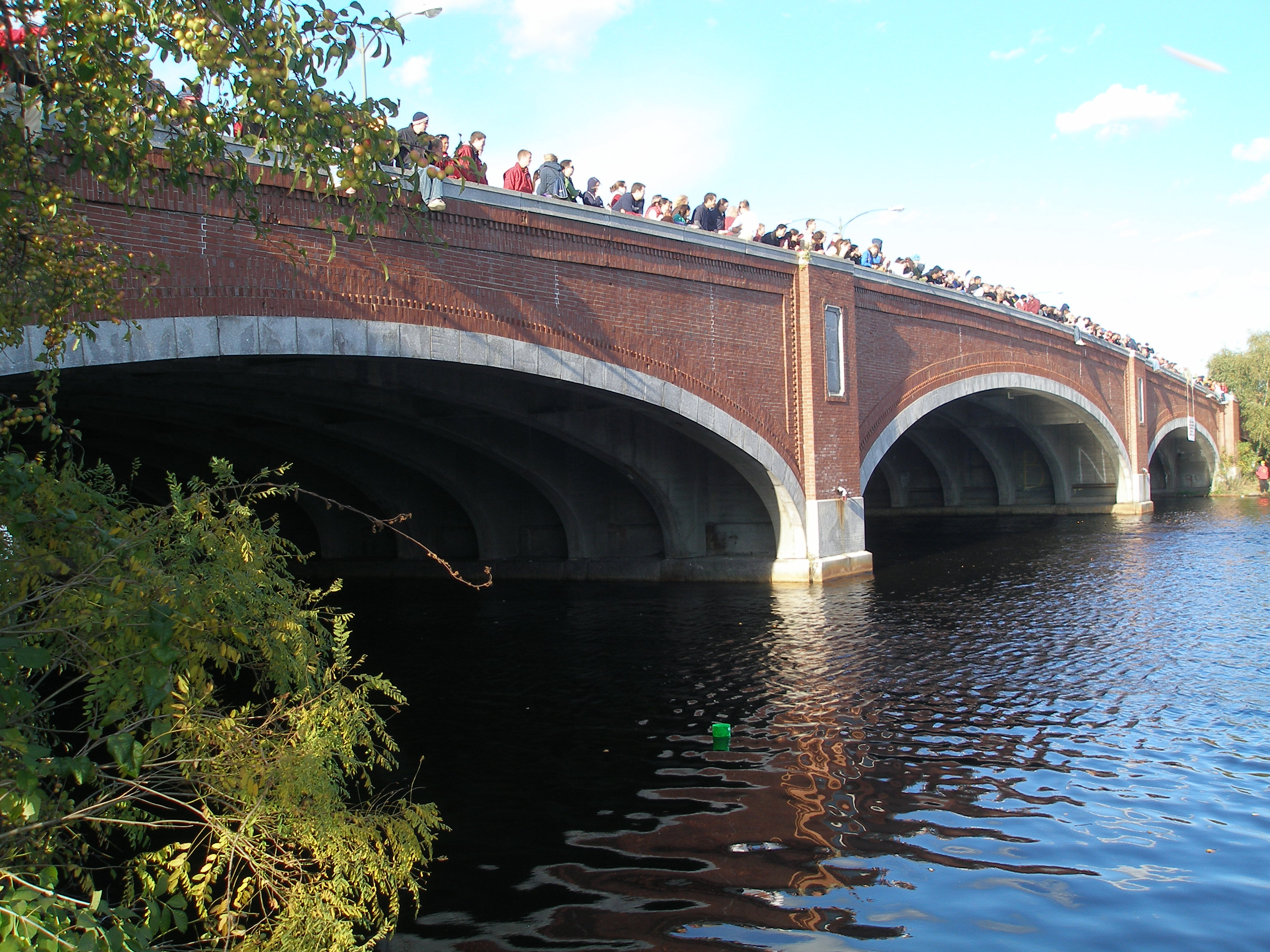
Eliot Bridge

The Weeks and Eliot Bridges fall at sharp turns in the course, and collisions occur here more than any other part of the course.

== Racing regulations ==
Crews start the race at 15-second intervals. The starting order is based on the crew's finishing time in the previous year, with the top finisher from the prior year leaving first, the second finisher leaving second, and so on. Crews that did not compete in the prior year are seeded after all prior year entrants in a random order, although race organizers have some discretion in the seeding process. Having presumably faster crews start ahead of presumably slower crews reduces the amount of passing boats must make during the race, reducing the potential for boating accidents. However, passing almost always occurs, and penalties are imposed on crews that do not follow passing regulations, such as failing to yield to a boat that closes to within one boat length of open water.

== History ==
=== First year ===
The Head of the Charles Regatta was first organized in 1965 by Cambridge Boat Club members D'Arcy MacMahon, Chris Richards, and Jack Vincent. The members of the boat club thought that a fall regatta would be an entertaining way to break up the monotony of the training season for colleges and boat clubs in the area. D'Arcy MacMahon had been the captain of the University of Pennsylvania's lightweight varsity three seasons earlier. They initially had little hope the regatta would be a success, it was the wrong time of year and it wasn't expected to draw any spectators.

Harvard University sculling instructor Ernest Arlett provided the idea for the head race. George Ernest Arlett came to the US because in England only "gentlemen" could race. Even when Arlett brought Northeastern University's rowing team to Henley Royal Regatta and the team members were invited, the team entered by the front door and Mr. Arlett still had to enter by the rear or servants door. Class snobbery or pedigree was still in force.

Despite their reservations, the founders of the regatta were determined to see it become a success. In an interview with New York Times, Jerry Olrich and MacMahon identified that this regatta was "destined to become a classic"

The Regatta expanded to a two-day event in 1997 and again to a three-day event in 2021.

In 1991, Frederick V. Schoch was appointed Executive Director of the Regatta, and he continues to oversee the event.

=== Charity program ===
Since 1998, the Head of the Charles Regatta's Charity Program has generated over $1,000,000 for its official charities, which include Cambridge Community Foundation and Community Rowing, Inc. The Charity Program allows competitors to gain an automatic entry into the Regatta in exchange for raising $1250 per person, per entry. Under official rules, any single, double, four, or eight is eligible to enter.

=== Cancellations ===
The race has been cancelled only twice: in 1996 due to storm bringing heavy rain and wind, and in 2020 due to the COVID-19 pandemic. (An online version in the fall of 2020 replaced the in-person race.)

== Awards ==
First place medals are awarded to winning competitors in each event category of the race. The first place medals are struck bronze medallions that are 2.5 inches in diameter. They show a single sculler from above on the front, and are engraved with the year and event on the back. Only the first place medals are distributed at the Regatta on Saturday and Sunday evenings following the races. Medals for second and third place medallions are of the same design, but are 1.75 inches in diameter. The Regatta issues additional subordinate medals according to the number of entries in the race as well.

1–9 Entries: up to 1st place awarded

10–19 Entries: up to 2nd place awarded

20–29 Entries: up to 3rd place awarded

30–39 Entries: up to 4th place awarded

40+ Entries: up to 5th place awarded

Special winner medals (2.5 inches in diameter) engraved (a) COLLEGE-CHAMPIONSHIP, (b) LIGHTWEIGHT, (c) CLUB, or (d) UNDER-17 shall be awarded respectively to (a) the fastest crew made up of undergraduates representing accredited/chartered Colleges or Universities in each event-division of the Championship 2x, Championship 4+ and Championship 8+, (b) the fastest Lightweight crew in the Championship 2x, (c) the fastest crew unaffiliated with an academic institution in each event-division of the Club 4+ and Club 8+, (d) the fastest U17 crew in the Youth Single, Youth Double, Youth Coxed Quad, Youth Four, and Youth Eight, and (e) the fastest JV entry in the Men’s and Women’s Championship Eight.

Special medals are also issued to the most competitive Grand-Veteran scullers in the Senior-Veteran Singles Event; the fastest Veteran crews in the Senior-Master 2x, 4+, and 8+ events; the fastest Grand-Master crews in the Senior-Master 2x, 4+, and 8+ events.

Because of the 2020 cancellation caused by the global pandemic, the 2021 regatta awarded a special medal to the fastest Class of 2020 crew in the Alumni Four and Alumni Eight (crew must be at least 75% 2020 graduates, coxswain excluded).

Winners of special medals will not be awarded subordinate medals should they qualify. No special medal will be awarded if the first place medal winner also qualifies for a special medal.

== Course records ==
Event	Men	Women	Mixed event
Club Singles	Kieran Edwards 17:54.795 (2023)	Mary Kaleta 20:07.040 (2022)	
Club Fours	Dartmouth College 16:01.965 (2023)	Calgary RC 17:47.415 (2021)	
Club Eights	Brown University 14:13.412 (2023)	Brown University 16:09.902 (2014)	
Youth Singles	Simeon John 18:06.27 (2024)	Anna Matthes 19:30.596 (2017)	
Youth Doubles	Nikhil Ramaraju, Charles Boldt 16:40.350 (2022)	Delaney Evans, Caroline Sharis 17:47.577 (2017)	
Youth Fours	Sacramento State Aquatic Center 16:07.357 (2019)	South Niagara RC 17:58.361 (2010)	
Youth Coxed Quads	New Canaan Crew (2017)	Danske Studenters Roklub 18:09.808 (2019)	
Youth Eights	St Paul's School, London 14:12.127 (2017)	RowAmerica Rye 16:09.072 (2024)	
Master Singles	Andrew Hashway 18:13.613 (2017)	Gevvie Stone 19:10.913 (2022)	
Master Doubles	N. Kelly, J. Watkins 16:55.843 (2022)	T. Zarzeczny-Bell/ S. Remmler 18:49.721 (2008)	
Master Fours	Ex Nemo 16:35.649 (2022)	Saugatuck Rowing Club 18:20.360 (2013)	
Master Eights	Shannon Rowing Club 14:46.602 (2014)	Capital 17:08.954 (2022)	
Grand Master Singles	Greg Benning 18:15.165 (2014)	Saiya Remmler 20:35.912 (2013)	
Grand Master Doubles	R. Colven, M. Biery 18:12.378 (2023)	Wilkie, Black 19:49.192 (2023)	
Grand-Master Fours	Sammamish Rowing Assoc. 18:04.515 (2017)	Chinook 20:08.48 (2017)	
Grand-Master Eights	Upper Yarra 15:55.952 (2022)	Lucky Charms 18:20.350 (2022)	
Senior Master Singles	Thomas Graves 18:15.477 (2022)	Shannon Kaplan 19:42.638 (2022)	
Senior-Master Doubles	Smith, Gorriaran 17:16.197 (2013)	Pearlstein, Gradek 19:02.956 (2023)	
Senior-Master Fours	Wallingford 17:05.64 (2017)	Cambridge Boat Club 18:45.4 (2017)	
Senior-Master Eights	Ex Nemo 15:12.030 (2022)	Chinook 17:22.9 (2017)	
Veteran Singles	Greg Benning 18:46.718 (2023)	Margarite Zezza (60) 20:53.91 (2017)	
Senior Veteran Singles	R. Kendall 20:31.75 (adjusted) (2001)	Catherine Widgery 23:34.029 (2023)	
Collegiate Fours	University of North Carolina 16:04.425 (2017)	Florida Institute of Technology 17:50.817 (2019)	
Collegiate Eights	Drexel 14:20.496 (2022)	Bates College 16:01.182 (2017)	
Lightweight Singles	Paul Fuchs 17:24.8 (1984)	Teresa Zarzeczny 19:00.58 (1992)	
Lightweight Fours	Yale University 15:42.932 (2017)	Undine Barge Club 17:54.864 (2010)	
Lightweight Eights	Princeton University 13:49.679 (2017)	Stanford University 15:46.726 (2017)	
Championship Singles	Sorin Koszyk 16:57.782 (2023)	Kathleen Bertko 18:33.015 (2013)	
Championship Doubles	Martin Sinković and Valent Sinković 15:40.56 (2014)	Ellen Hogerwerf, Inge Janssen 17:27.510 (2014)	
Championship Fours	USRowing Training Center 15:07.44 (2017)	Brown University 17:08.207 (2017)	
Championship Eights	USRowing 13:23.638 (2022)	Sudbury 14:48.423 (2017)	
Alumni Fours	Delaware Alumni 16:08.787 (2022)	Brown Univ. Alumni 19:55.687 (2021)	
Alumni Eights	University of Washington Alumni 14:35.782 (2021)	Virginia Alumni 15:48.524 (2017)	
Mixed LTA Four			US Para National Team 18:10.142 (2016)
Mixed Inclusion Four			Community Rowing, Inc. 19:37.897 (2016)
Mixed Inclusion Double			M. Houser, M. Scott 19:11.999 (2021)
Trunk/Arms Double			I. French, H. Roman 22:52.218 (2017)
