= List of crossings of the Charles River =

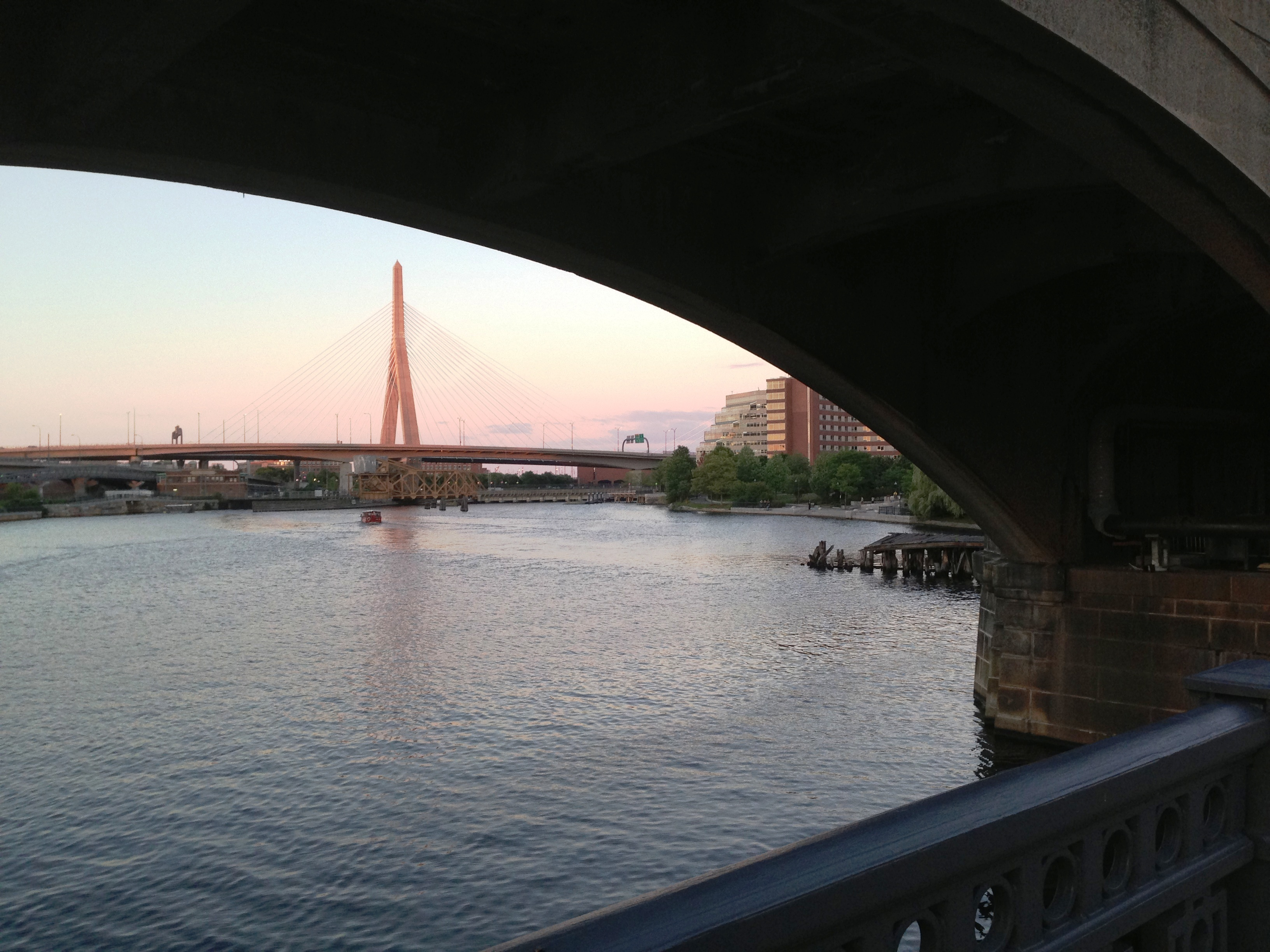
Five bridges over the Charles River are visible in this photograph; in order from front to back, they are the Old Charles River Dam, Lechmere Viaduct, Draw One, Zakim Bridge, and New Charles River Dam.

This is a list of the crossings of the Charles River from its mouth at Boston Harbor upstream to its source at Echo Lake (the four tunnels crossing the inner portion of Boston Harbor are not included). All locations are in Massachusetts.

== Crossings ==
Image	Crossing	Carries or connects	Location	Built	Length	Notes	Coordinates
	William Felton "Bill" Russell Bridge (formerly Charlestown Bridge)	Route 99 (N. Washington St)	Boston to Charlestown	1900	331.9 meters (1,089 ft)	The MBTA Orange Line used this bridge, before the upstream tunnel was completed in 1975. Site of a ferry established in 1630; obsoleted by the Charles River Bridge, built 1786	42°22′08″N 71°03′36″W
	(New) Charles River Dam	pedestrians and bikers	Boston to Charlestown	1978		Fish ladder, pumps and three locks for navigation. Site of the Warren Bridge, built 1828, demolished 1962.	42°22′07″N 71°03′41.10″W
Leonard P. Zakim Bunker Hill Bridge	Leonard P. Zakim Bunker Hill Bridge	I-93 / US 1	Boston to Charlestown	2003	442.2 meters (1,451 ft)	Replaced Charlestown High Bridge, built 1956, demolished 2004	42°22′08″N 71°03′49″W
Leonard P. Zakim Bunker Hill Bridge	Haymarket North Extension tunnel	MBTA Orange Line	Boston to Charlestown	1975			
Leonard P. Zakim Bunker Hill Bridge	Leverett Circle Connector Bridge	I-93 exit 18 onramp and offramp	Boston to Cambridge	1999	253 meters (830 ft)		42°22′08″N 71°03′52″W
	Draw One	MBTA Commuter Rail at North Station	Boston to Cambridge	1931		Two bascule drawbridges. Site of Boston and Lowell Railroad Charles River Bridge, built 1835, first movable railroad bridge in the United States	42°22′8.29″N 71°03′54.96″W
	MBTA Green Line Lechmere Viaduct	MBTA Green Line	Boston to Cambridge	1912			42°22′2.32″N 71°04′8.29″W
	(Old) Charles River Dam Bridge	Route 28 (Charles River Dam Rd)	Boston to Cambridge	1910	25 meters (82 ft)	The Boston Museum of Science is located on this bridge	42°22′01.66″N 71°04′08.87″W
	Longfellow Bridge	Route 3 (Main St/Cambridge St); MBTA Red Line	Boston to Cambridge	1907	650.7 meters (2,135 ft)	MBTA Red Line in median; built in 1907 as the Cambridge Bridge, renamed for Henry Wadsworth Longfellow in 1927. Site of West Boston Bridge, built 1793	42°21′41″N 71°04′32″W
	Harvard Bridge	Route 2A (Massachusetts Avenue)	Boston to Cambridge	1891, 1909 (rebuilt), 1924 (overhaul), 1990 (rebuilt)	659.9 meters (2,165 ft)	Longest bridge over the Charles. Northern terminus at MIT, not Harvard University.	42°21′15″N 71°05′28″W
	Boston University Bridge	Route 2	Boston to Cambridge	1927		built as the Cottage Farm Bridge, renamed in 1949	42°21′09.12″N 71°06′38.26″W
	Grand Junction Railroad Bridge	MBTA Grand Junction Branch	Boston to Cambridge			crosses the river under the Boston University Bridge	42°21′09.69″N 71°06′36.72″W
	River Street Bridge	River St/Cambridge St	Boston to Cambridge	1926			42°21′41″N 71°07′00″W
	Western Avenue Bridge	Western Avenue	Boston to Cambridge	1924	85.3 meters (280 ft)		42°21′51.25″N 71°07′01.13″W
	John W. Weeks Bridge	pedestrians	Boston to Cambridge	1926		the only footbridge across the basin, with a Harvard campus steam tunnel inside	42°22′6.63″N 71°07′05.26″W
	Anderson Memorial Bridge	N. Harvard Street/JFK Street	Boston to Cambridge	1912	70.7 meters (232 ft)	A memorial to Nicholas Longworth Anderson donated by his son Larz Anderson Site of a ferry established 1635 at the foot of Dunster Street in Cambridge, at canal/creek; obsoleted by Great Bridge, built 1662, rebuilt 1862	42°22′08″N 71°07′23″W
	Eliot Bridge	Soldiers Field Rd, Memorial Drive	Boston to Cambridge	1950	91.4 meters (300 ft)	a memorial to Charles W. Eliot, Harvard president 1869–1909, and his son Charles Eliot, landscape architect for the Metropolitan Park Commission	42°22′18″N 71°07′59″W
	Arsenal Street Bridge	Arsenal St/Western Ave	Brighton to Watertown	1925	61.9 meters (203 ft)		42°21′42″N 71°08′50″W
	North Beacon Street Bridge	US 20	Brighton to Watertown	1917	62.5 meters (205 ft)		42°21′32″N 71°09′42″W
	Watertown Bridge	Route 16 (Galen Street)	Watertown	about 1907	27.4 meters (90 ft)		42°21′53″N 71°11′08″W
	Watertown Dam	no crossing	Watertown	1900		The Charles River Watershed Association has proposed removal of the dam.	42°21′55.27″N 71°11′21.34″W
	Cpl. Joseph U. Thompson Footbridge	pedestrians and bicycles	Watertown			Demolished 2017	42°21′54.39″N 71°11′24.97″W
	Cpl. Joseph U. Thompson Footbridge (new)	pedestrians and bicycles	Watertown	2018		Replaced old span	42°21′54.39″N 71°11′24.97″W
	Bridge Street Bridge	Bridge St	Newton to Watertown		29.3 meters (96 ft)		42°21′56.87″N 71°12′15.96″W
	Bemis Dam (breached)	no crossing	Newton to Watertown	1821		breached 1944	42°21′56.58″N 71°12′17.92″W
	Blue Heron Footbridge	Charles River Bike Path	Newton to Watertown	2005			42°21′53.33″N 71°12′45.85″W
	Farwell Street Bridge	Farwell St	Waltham		33.4 meters (110 ft)		42°22′1.3″N 71°13′5.1″W
	Bleachery Footbridge	Former pedestrian bridge site, demolished 1960s.	Waltham				42°22′8.2″N 71°13′20.4″W
	Bleachery Dam	no crossing	Waltham	1794		originally Gore Paper Mill dam	42°22′8.83″N 71°13′22.74″W
	Mary T. Early Footbridge		Waltham	2004		formerly Calvary Street Footbridge	42°22′10.74″N 71°13′25.94″W
	Boston & Maine Railroad trestle (abandoned)	abandoned Watertown Branch Railroad	Waltham			Demolished in 2016	42°22′11.11″N 71°13′26.29″W
	Charles F. Graceffa Bridge	Newton Street	Waltham	1877	27.4 meters (90 ft)		42°22′21.10″N 71°13′43.51″W
	Elm Street Bridge	Elm St	Waltham		71.9 meters (236 ft)		42°22′22.87″N 71°13′57.19″W
	Boston & Maine Railroad trestle (abandoned)	abandoned Watertown Branch	Waltham			Demolished in 2015	42°22′22.21″N 71°13′59.12″W
	Richard Landry Park footbridge		Waltham	1978			42°22′20.59″N 71°14′5.95″W
	Waltham Dam or Moody Street Dam		Waltham	1836		original Eden Vale dam built 1785	42°22′22.87″N 71°14′10.24″W
	Moody Street bridge		Waltham	1946	68.6 meters (225 ft)	original built 1846, rebuilt 1871, 1921	42°22′23.61″N 71°14′11.63″W
	Gold Star Mothers Bridge		Waltham	1889	40.2 meters (132 ft)	Carries Prospect Street; drawbridge 1882	42°22′7.91″N 71°14′36.93″W
	Commonwealth Avenue/South Avenue Bridge	Route 30	Newton to Weston			site of old Norumbega Bridge	42°20′38.27″N 71°15′41.01″W
	I-90/I-95 connector	I-90 / I-95	Newton to Weston			original Mass Pike terminus until 1964	42°20′29.76″N 71°15′42.51″W
	Massachusetts Turnpike Boston Extension (Interstate 90)	I-90	Newton to Weston		316.1 meters (1,037 ft)		42°20′27.53″N 71°15′39.42″W
	I-90/I-95 connector	I-90 / I-95	Newton to Weston				42°20′27.62″N 71°15′34.98″W
	Footbridge from Riverside Rd., Newton to Recreation Rd., Weston	pedestrians	Newton to Weston			demolished 2023; replacement under construction, scheduled for completion in 2025	42°20′28.36″N 71°15′29.73″W
	Road bridge from Riverside Rd., Newton to Recreation Rd., Weston		Newton to Weston			demolished 1960s around time of Massachusetts Turnpike Extension	42°20′28.36″N 71°15′29.73″W
	CSX/MBTA railroad bridge	Framingham/Worcester Line	Newton to Weston			Single-arch concrete span	42°20′26.45″N 71°15′25.44″W
	Pony Truss Bridge	pedestrians	Newton to Weston			accessible from Riverside Park off Recreation Rd., Weston	42°20′24.16″N 71°15′21.39″W
	I-95 offramp		Newton to Weston		180.4 meters (592 ft)	northbound exits 23–25; originally Route 128 until 1964	42°20′15.466″N 71°15′26.56″W
	I-95 / Route 128	I-95 / Route 128	Newton to Weston		93.6 meters (307 ft)		42°20′11.83″N 71°15′31.04″W
	Concord Street/Park Road bridge		Newton to Weston		24.7 meters (81 ft)		42°19′50.04″N 71°16′4.53″W
	Leo J. Martin Golf Club Footbridge		Newton to Wellesley				42°19′42.16″N 71°16′12.29″W
	Newton–Wellesley Lower Falls Pedestrian and Bicycle Bridge		Newton to Wellesley	rebuilt 2012		formerly abandoned Boston & Albany RR Newton Lower Falls Branch bridge	42°19′36.34″N 71°15′40.58″W
	Washington Street Bridge	Route 16	Newton to Wellesley		43 meters (141 ft)		42°19′31.15″N 71°15′30.07″W
	Finlay Dam		Newton to Wellesley				42°19′31.74″N 71°15′15.78″W
	Cordingly Dam and Falls		Newton to Wellesley				42°19′31.6″N 71°15′15.8″W
	Mary Hunnewell Fyffe Footbridge		Newton to Wellesley	1983		Previous bridges built in 1909 and before 1906	42°19′33″N 71°15′16″W
	Wales Street/Walnut Street Bridge		Newton to Wellesley		17.9 meters (59 ft)		42°19′36.39″N 71°15′11.42″W
	Cochituate Aqueduct	Closed.	Newton to Wellesley	1848			42°19′27.48″N 71°14′59.95″W
	I-95 / Route 128	I-95 / Route 128	Newton to Wellesley				42°19′25.09″N 71°14′57.36″W
	Boston-Worcester Turnpike Bridge	Route 9	Newton to Wellesley		23.2 meters (76 ft)		42°19′00.5″N 71°13′41.2″W
	Metropolitan Circular Dam	No crossing.	Newton to Wellesley	2010s replacement for older dam			42°18′59.6″N 71°13′41.1″W
	Echo Bridge	pedestrians, bicycles, and the Sudbury Aqueduct	Newton to Needham	1876			42°18′53.13″N 71°13′37.17″W
	Silk Mill Dam	No crossing.	Newton to Needham				42°18′49.76″N 71°13′34.82″W
	Elliot Street/Central Avenue Bridge	Eliot St/Central Ave	Newton to Needham				42°18′44.30″N 71°13′37.37″W
	rail bridge	Closed.	Newton to Needham			Formerly carried the Charles River Railroad. A proposal was made in 2023 to rehabilitate the bridge as a link in a proposed "Newton/Needham Community Way".	42°18′26.08″N 71°13′26.32″W
	Needham Street Bridge	Needham Street, Newton / Highland Avenue, Needham	Newton to Needham	1875	27.7 meters (91 ft)		42°18′23.51″N 71°13′1.02″W
	Christina Street rail bridge	Closed.	Newton to Needham			The City of Newton is studying the replacement of this bridge with a new structure.	42°18′21.65″N 71°12′46.73″W
	Kendrick Street/Nahanton Street Bridge	Kendrick St/Nahanton St	Newton to Needham		49.4 meters (162 ft)		42°17′49.57″N 71°12′28.12″W
	MBTA Commuter Rail Needham Line bridge		West Roxbury to Needham				42°16′46.17″N 71°11′6.89″W
	Honorable Robert L. Cawley Bridge	Route 109 Bridge Street, Dedham / Spring Street, West Roxbury	West Roxbury to Dedham		21.3 meters (70 ft)		42°16′15.02″N 71°10′23.90″W
	Ames Street Bridge		Dedham		35.7 meters (117 ft)	A footbridge was first built in this location in 1640 by William Bullard and John Eaton. It was the first crossing in Dedham.	42°15′8.61″N 71°10′34.37″W
	Bridge Street Bridge	Route 109	Dedham		21.3 meters (70 ft)		42°15′14.85″N 71°10′51.60″W
	Interstate 95/Route 128	I-95 / Route 128	Needham to Dedham		98.5 meters (323 ft) (SB); 89 meters (292 ft) (NB)		42°16′1.96″N 71°12′10.20″W; Between exits 17 & 18 on I-95
	Greendale Avenue/Lyons Street Bridge		Needham to Dedham	1879	17.1 meters (56 ft)	There has been a bridge on the site since the 1740s, but the current bridge was built in 1879. (Note: Lyons Street originally ran as far as Common Street but was cut short and dead ended when Route 128 was built. Lyons Street is named for a 19th century landowner, Elisha Lyon. Lyon lived on the Needham side of the Charles River.)	42°16′1.33″N 71°12′17.42″W
	Route 135/West Street/Dedham Avenue Bridge	Route 135	Needham to Dedham		17.1 meters (56 ft)		42°16′3.67″N 71°13′4.89″W
	Chestnut Street Bridge		Needham to Dover		33.8 meters (111 ft)		42°15′35.40″N 71°14′13.48″W
	USGS 01103500/ LHD 25866	No crossing.	Needham to Dover			A USGS flow gauge is located here.	42°15′22.7″N 71°15′34.8″W
	Cochrane Dam	No crossing.	Needham to Dover				42°15′31″N 71°15′46.8″W
	Willow Street/South Street Bridge		Needham to Dover		17 meters (56 ft)		42°15′32.66″N 71°15′47.26″W
	rail bridge	Closed.	Needham to Dover			Formerly carried the Charles River Railroad	42°15′26.97″N 71°16′14.26″W
	Central Ave/Centre Street Bridge		Needham to Dover		20.7 meters (68 ft)		42°15′32.37″N 71°16′17.31″W
	missing bridge?		Needham to Dover				42°15′48.07″N 71°17′5.55″W
	Dover Road/Charles River Street Bridge		Needham to Dover		38.6 meters (127 ft)		42°16′9.50″N 71°17′59.43″W
	Cheney Drive Bridge		Needham to Dover		19.5 meters (64 ft)	Access road to Elm Bank Reservation.	42°16′32.68″N 71°18′34.38″W
	Water Street Bridge	No longer extant.	South Natick				42°16′13.8″N 71°18′31.3″W
	Pleasant Street Bridge		South Natick		34.4 meters (113 ft)		42°16′18.13″N 71°18′54.52″W
	South Natick Dam		South Natick			In 2022, the Town of Natick Select Board voted to seek state approval to remove the dam.	42°16′17.27″N 71°18′56.57″W
	Sargent Bridge		South Natick			No public access.	42.26696°N 71.32112°W
	Farm Road/Bridge Street Bridge		Sherborn to Dover				42°13′57.45″N 71°19′48.67″W
	rail bridge	CSX Framingham Secondary	Sherborn to Medfield				42°12′53.43″N 71°20′53.79″W
	South Main Street/North Meadows Road Bridge	Route 27 (Hospital Road)	Sherborn to Medfield		21.9 meters (72 ft)		42°12′35.98″N 71°21′6.23″W
	former bridge?		Sherborn to Medfield				42°12′28.00″N 71°21′7.20″W
	rail bridge	Millis Industrial Track	Medfield to Millis				42°11′18.38″N 71°20′3.54″W
	Dover Road Bridge		Medfield to Millis			Bridge site going back to 1640s, including one burnt by Native Americans during King Philip's War in 1675.	42°11′19.41″N 71°19′59.76″W
	Turner Bridge (Main Street Bridge)	Route 109	Medfield to Millis		20.1 meters (66 ft)		42°10′52″N 71°19′21.52″W
	Dwight's Bridge	Dwight Street Millis to Medfield	Medfield to Millis			Over the Charles River off Causeway Street on Dwight Street. This was so named and built so Timothy Dwight could get to land he owned in the area. This bridge was washed out in the Great 1936 Flood and never rebuilt.	42°10′24.8″N 71°19′23.3″W
	Forest Road/Orchard Street Bridge		Medfield to Millis		17.7 meters (58 ft)		42°9′28.26″N 71°19′55.43″W
	Norfolk Road Bridge	Route 115	Millis		21.9 meters (72 ft)		42°8′35.80″N 71°20′57.42″W
	Dean Street/Pleasant Street Bridge		Millis				42°8′17.64″N 71°21′31.08″W
	Destroyed railroad bridge	Medway Branch	Millis	1852		Rail line was abandoned in 1864. Bridge abutments remain.	42.135027°N 71.36036°W
	Myrtle Street bridge		Millis		22.1 meters (73 ft)		42°8′0.63″N 71°21′42.86″W
	Destroyed railroad bridge	Medway Branch	1852	Medway		Rail line was abandoned in 1864. Bridge abutments remain.	42.137669°N 71.386178°W
	Walker Street Bridge			Medway	24.4 meters (80 ft)		42°8′24.32″N 71°23′22.39″W
	Sanford Street Bridge		Medway to Franklin				42°8′17.96″N 71°23′54″W
	Sanford Mill Dam		Medway to Franklin				42°8′19.2″N 71°23′55.4″W
	Shaw Street/Elm Street Bridge		Medway to Franklin				42°8′11.40″N 71°25′6.72″W
	Woodland Park Bridge		Medway to Franklin				42°8′19.39″N 71°25′18.92″W
	dam	No crossing.	Medway to Franklin				42°8′20.62″N 71°25′27.07″W
	Franklin Street/Pond Street Bridge		Medway to Franklin		10.1 meters (33 ft)		42°8′17.36″N 71°25′51.87″W
	Pearl Street Bridge		Bellingham		20.5 meters (67 ft)		42°7′51.52″N 71°26′38.53″W
	Plymouth Road Bridge		Bellingham		12.5 meters (41 ft)		42°7′22.07″N 71°26′51.69″W
	Maple Street Bridge		Bellingham		12.2 meters (40 ft)		42°7′10.32″N 71°27′12.35″W
	Maple Street Dam		Bellingham				42°7′8.6″N 71°27′15.2″W
	I-495 bridge	I-495	Bellingham		10.1 meters (33 ft)		42°06′27″N 71°27′30″W
	High Street Bridge		Bellingham		10.7 meters (35 ft)		42°5′50.69″N 71°27′33.07″W
	footbridge	Onetime road bridge site	Bellingham				42°5′22.91″N 71°28′13.16″W
	North Main Street Bridge	Route 126	Bellingham		9.4 meters (31 ft)		42°05′39″N 71°28′34″W
	rail bridge		Bellingham				42°5′39.54″N 71°28′50.71″W
	Depot Street Bridge		Bellingham		16.5 meters (54 ft)		42°5′38.39″N 71°28′55.65″W
	Hartford Avenue Bridge		Bellingham to Mendon/Hopedale				42°6′12.41″N 71°29′59.19″W
	rail bridge		Bellingham to Hopedale				42°06′41.8″N 71°30′4.9″W
	Mellen Street Bridge and Dam		Bellingham to Hopedale				42°07′0.8″N 71°30′5″W
	Howard Street Bridge		Hopedale to Milford				42°07′5.30″N 71°30′17.88″W
	rail bridge		Hopedale to Milford				42°7′7.22″N 71°30′20.97″W
	Howard Street Bridge		Milford				42°07′32″N 71°30′33″W
	rail bridge		Milford				42°7′36.9″N 71°30′33.9″W
	Central Street Bridge		Milford				42°08′21″N 71°30′45″W
	Main Street Culvert	Route 16	Milford				42°08′37″N 71°30′47″W
	Milford Pond Dam and Footbridge		Milford				42°08′50.9″N 71°30′49.2″W
	Dilla Street Bridge		Milford				42°09′41″N 71°30′43″W
	Dilla Street Dam		Milford				42°09′41.3″N 71°30′41.8″W
	old road bridge		Milford				42°09′52.3″N 71°30′38.7″W
	culvert	Upper Charles Trail	Milford				42°09′52.4″N 71°30′38.9″W
	I-495 culvert (Exit 20)	I-495	Milford				42°10′04″N 71°30′41″W
	Wildcat Pond Bridge and Dam	Private road	Milford				42°7′8.6″N 71°27′15.2″W
	footbridge		Milford				42°10′22.3″N 71°30′34.3″W
	bridge	Upper Charles River Trail	Milford				42°10′25.7″N 71°30′30.6″W
	Route 85 bridge	Route 85	Milford				42°10′26″N 71°30′30″W
	footbridge		Milford				42°10′43.7″N 71°30′21.7″W
	bridge	Upper Charles River Trail	Milford				42°10′44.1″N 71°30′22.1″W
	footbridge		Milford				42°10′52.5″N 71°30′19.7″W
	footbridge		Milford				42°10′54.8″N 71°30′20.8″W
	Route 85 bridge	Route 85	Milford				42°10′55″N 71°30′22″W
	Echo Lake Dam	No crossing.	Hopkinton				42°11′32″N 71°30′28.7″W

Source: Echo Lake 42.193012°N 71.5119°W

== See also ==
- Charles River Bridge v. Warren Bridge
- List of bridges in Boston
