= Chelsea Branch Railroad =

Chelsea Branch Railroad may refer to:

- Chelsea Branch Railroad (New Jersey), 1889–1896, predecessor of the West Jersey and Seashore Railroad (Pennsylvania Railroad system, later Pennsylvania-Reading Seashore Lines) in Atlantic City
- Chelsea Branch Railroad (Massachusetts), 1846–1847, predecessor of the Boston and Albany Railroad (New York Central system) in the Boston area
