= New England Produce Center =

The New England Produce Center also known as the Chelsea Produce Market is a wholesale market for produce on Market Street in Chelsea, Massachusetts, one of the largest in the world. It is served by the Grand Junction Railroad in addition to truck links via Interstate 93 and Boston's Northeast Expressway (Route 1). The surrounding industrial area has a U.S. Post Office as well as many restaurant and food wholesale businesses.
