= Draw One =

Railway bridge in Massachusetts, US

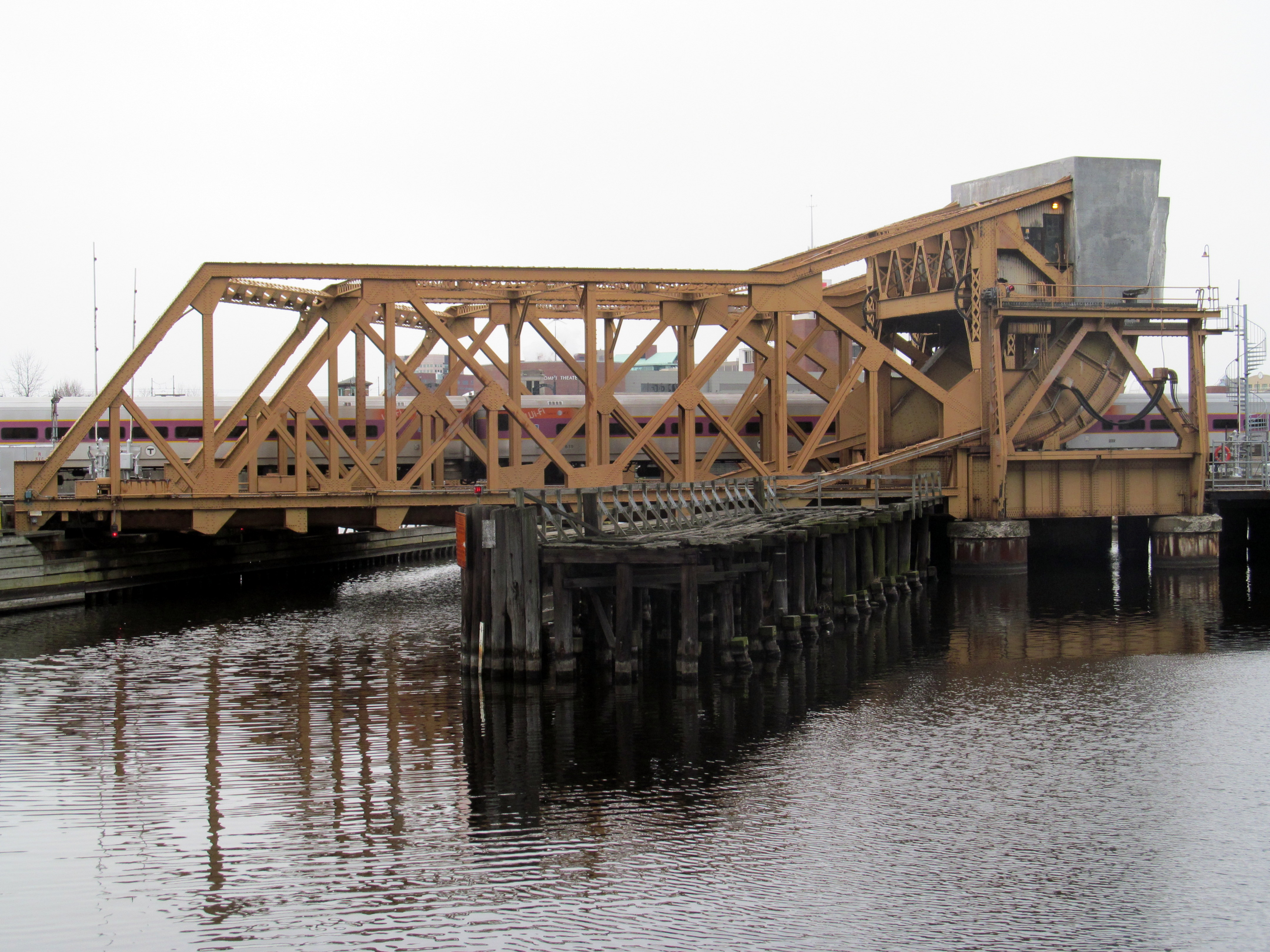
- The bridges with an MBTA train in 2013
- Coordinates: 42.36898°N 71.06529°W
- Carries: 4 tracks of North Station rail approaches
- Crosses: Charles River
- Locale: Boston, Massachusetts

Characteristics
- Design: single-leaf, through-truss, rolling bascule bridge
- Material: Steel
- Total length: 92 feet (28 m) (±5 feet (1.5 m))
- No. of spans: 1
- Piers in water: 0

History
- Designer: Keller & Harrington, Chicago
- Opened: 1931

Location
- Interactive map of Draw One

Draw One is a pair of single-leaf, through-truss, rolling bascule bridges across the Charles River in Boston, Massachusetts. The bridges connect North Station to MBTA Commuter Rail lines serving areas to the north. They will be replaced by three new two-track vertical lift spans from 2026 to 2034.

== History ==
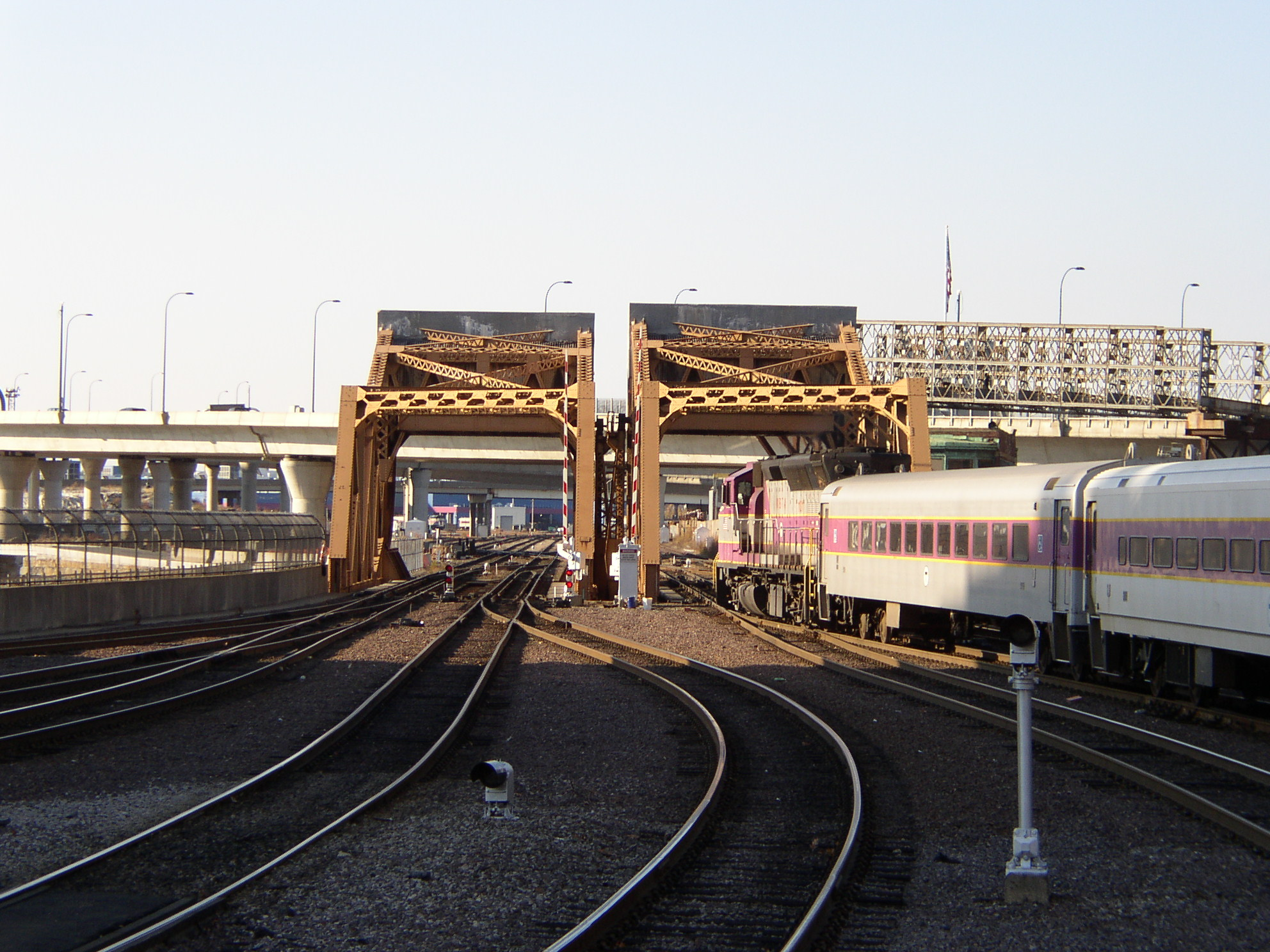
MBTA 1131 departing with a Haverhill service over the bridges in 2006

Although rail bridges across the Charles River near the present location of North Station have existed since the Boston and Lowell Railroad opened in 1835, the current bridges date from 1931, when the navigable channel of the Charles River was shifted 300 feet to the north of its former route to allow the platforms at North Station to be extended northwards. These bridges were designed by Keller & Harrington of Chicago, Illinois, and built by the Phoenix Bridge Company of Phoenixville, Pennsylvania. Each bridge uses a 629-short-ton (571 t) over-head concrete counterweight. Originally, there were four bridges, but only two of them remain. The bridges were formerly connected to North Station by a wooden trestle; the trestle burned in January 1984, forcing all trains to terminate at temporary stations north of the river for 15 months.

The two aging two-track draw spans are planned to be replaced by three new two-track spans, which will be more reliable and have higher capacity. The unfinished sixth platform at North Station will be completed to serve long out-of-service tracks 11 and 12, the Fitchburg mainline will be slightly relocated to provide more layover space near the maintenance facility, and FX interlocking will be reconfigured. The signals contract associated with the new drawbridges was awarded in May 2019. As of July 2025, signal work is expected to be completed in 2026. Design of the new vertical lift bridges began in 2019 and was 75% complete by May 2023.

In September 2024, the MBTA was awarded a $472 million federal grant for the bridge replacement. The draft environmental assessment was released in December 2024, with bridge construction expected to last from 2026 to 2034. The MBTA began procurement of a design-build contractor in early 2025, with award of the approximately-$1-billion contract expected by December 2025. A separate $61 million contract for program and construction management was awarded in July 2025. The MBTA awarded a $1.06-billion design-build contract to Skanska Civil Northeast/Koch JV in May 2026. Notice to proceed was given in May 2026. Groundbreaking took place in September 2026. At that time, the $1.286 billion project was expected to be complete in late 2032.

== See also ==
- List of bridges documented by the Historic American Engineering Record in Massachusetts
- List of crossings of the Charles River
