= Ernest Arlett =

American Athletics Coach

G. Ernest Arlett (Ernie) is a member of the Northeastern University athletics Hall of Fame. Arlett was the first head coach of the Northeastern University Men's Rowing team. Arlett was inducted in 1976 for his accomplishments in crew. Arlett also was the United States Olympic coach for Sculling during the 1976 Summer Olympic Games. Arlett also is credited with the creation of the Head of the Charles Regatta, which was organized in 1965.

== Early life ==
Arlett was born in 1912 in Henley on Thames, Oxfordshire, England where his family has been in coaching and rowing for more than a hundred years

Prior to coaching, in World War II he was trapped, along with a half-million soldiers on the beaches of Dunkirk. He commandeered a boat and rowed fellow "Tommies" to waiting destroyers during the famous evacuation.

He was a member of the Arlett watermen's family and acted as boatman at Radley, Leander and the National Provincial Bank at Putney until 1957 before emigrating to the US. When coming to the United States he started off as a freshman coach and rigger (boatman) at Rutgers university

He was a top-flight sculler in England, coached Finland's Olympic crew in 1948, and coached Jack Kelly Jr., of Philadelphia when he competed in the Diamond Sculls of Henley.

== Northeastern University ==
Arlett was the founding coach of the Northeastern Mens rowing team. During the 1965 season Arlett helped to lead Northeastern to the Small College Championship. In a young legend known as the Wreck of the Hecht, Northeastern demolished a borrowed shell its first time on the river. Northeastern then was invited to the IRA Regatta along with the Henley Royal Regatta. During the 1972 and 1973 seasons, Northeastern won the men's heavyweight eight at the Eastern Sprints championships. Both of those seasons also saw NU battled in the finals of the Grand Challenge Cup, where the Huskies ultimately lost. He retired from Northeastern in 1979.

== Coaching ==
After graduating Arlett went off to coach crew in 1932 at Oxford. Arlett then coached at Lower Merion (Pa.) High School. Arlett them moved to Boston coaching Harvard, Rutgers, and Northeastern. In 1976, Arlett was named as the 1976 US Olympic men's sculling coach.

== Later life ==
1982 took up coaching again at Connecticut College in New London.

Ernie died on February 11, 1997, in Atlanta, Georgia.

== Arlett Cup ==
In his honor, the Arlett Cup is awarded to the winner of the annual Northeastern-BU race.

== Family ==
Arlett has a son Bob

== Quotes ==
"If this hadn't been a good group of boys not afraid of my bark and growl—of which I've got plenty—one or the other of us would have been long gone by now. But they've been all I hoped for. Those who had thought it was going to be a boating party drifted away directly as I put them to work. Despite my grunts and groans the stayers are a pretty happy lot."

- (Arlett when discussing starting the rowing program at Northeastern)
