= Boston Harbor tunnel =

Boston Harbor tunnel may refer to one of the following tunnels under Boston Harbor:

- Callahan Tunnel
- Sumner Tunnel
- Ted Williams Tunnel

== See also ==
- List of crossings of the Charles River
