= Boston University Bridge =

Bridge over the Charles River between Boston and Cambridge, Massachusetts

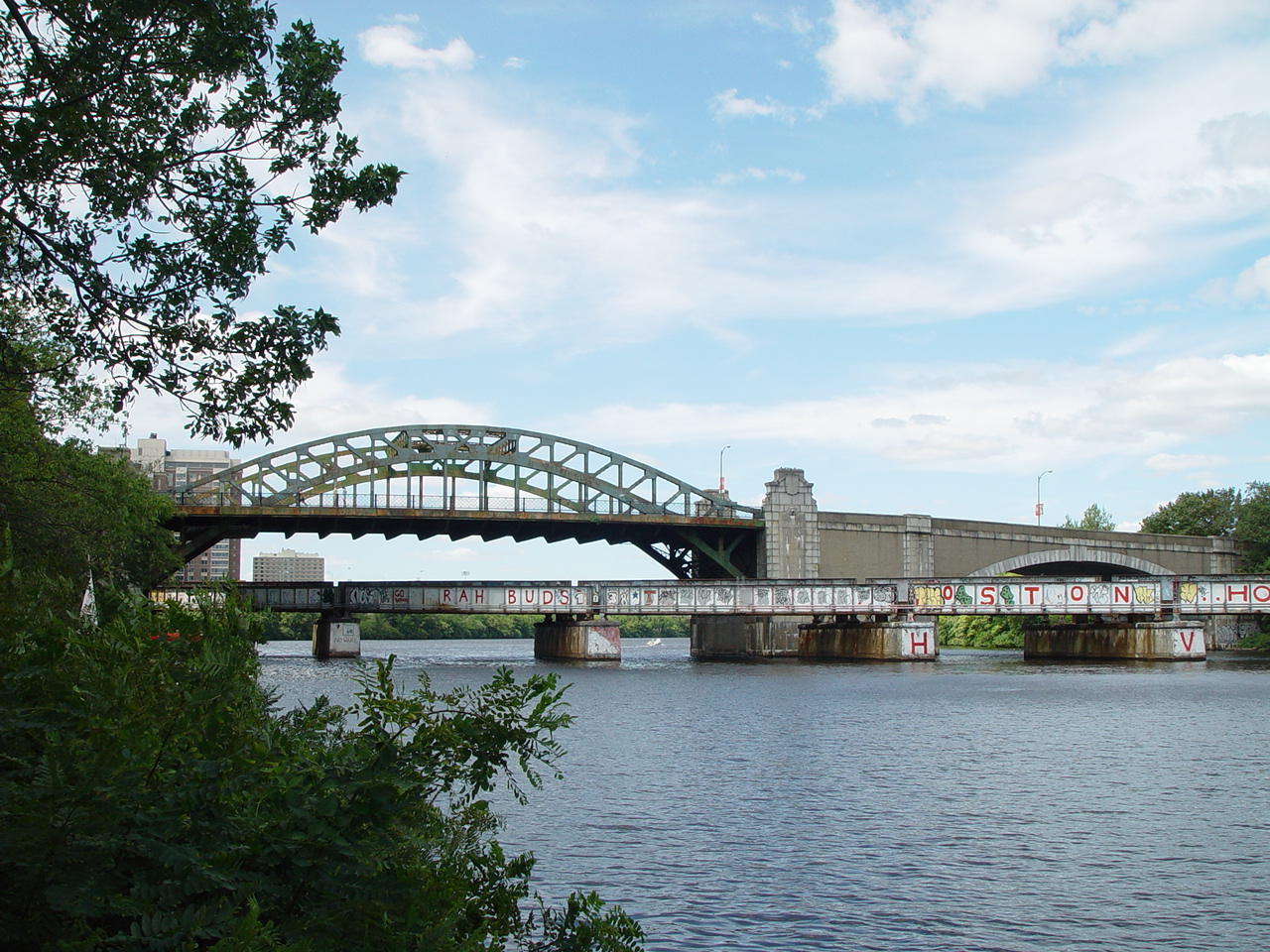
- The Boston University bridge and Grand Junction Railroad bridge, seen from the Boston side looking upstream.
- Coordinates: 42.35238°N 71.11066°W
- Carries: Route 2
- Crosses: Charles River
- Locale: Boston, Massachusetts to Cambridge, Massachusetts

Characteristics
- Design: Truss through arch bridge
- Material: Steel

History
- Designer: Andrew Canzanelli
- Opened: 1928

Location
- Interactive map of Boston University Bridge

The Boston University Bridge, originally the Cottage Farm Bridge and commonly referred to as the BU Bridge, is a steel truss through arch bridge with a suspended deck carrying Route 2 (Note: According to the American Association of State Highway and Transportation Officials route log, the bridge also carries U.S. Route 3 across the river to its southern terminus at U.S. Route 20 (also known as Commonwealth Avenue). However, the Massachusetts Department of Transportation does not consider the bridge to be a part of US 3; it continues the route along Memorial Drive in Cambridge until it meets Route 2A at the end of the Harvard Bridge.) over the Charles River, connecting the Boston University campus to Cambridge, Massachusetts.

The bridge, with the Grand Junction Railroad Bridge directly underneath it, is incorrectly rumored to be the only place in the world where a boat can sail under a train driving under a car driving under an airplane. Other such places include the Steel Bridge in Portland, Oregon, the Manhattan Bridge in New York City and the 25 de Abril Bridge in Lisbon, although all of those bridges feature road and rail on the same span. In this case the rail and road traffic are on separate bridges.

== History ==
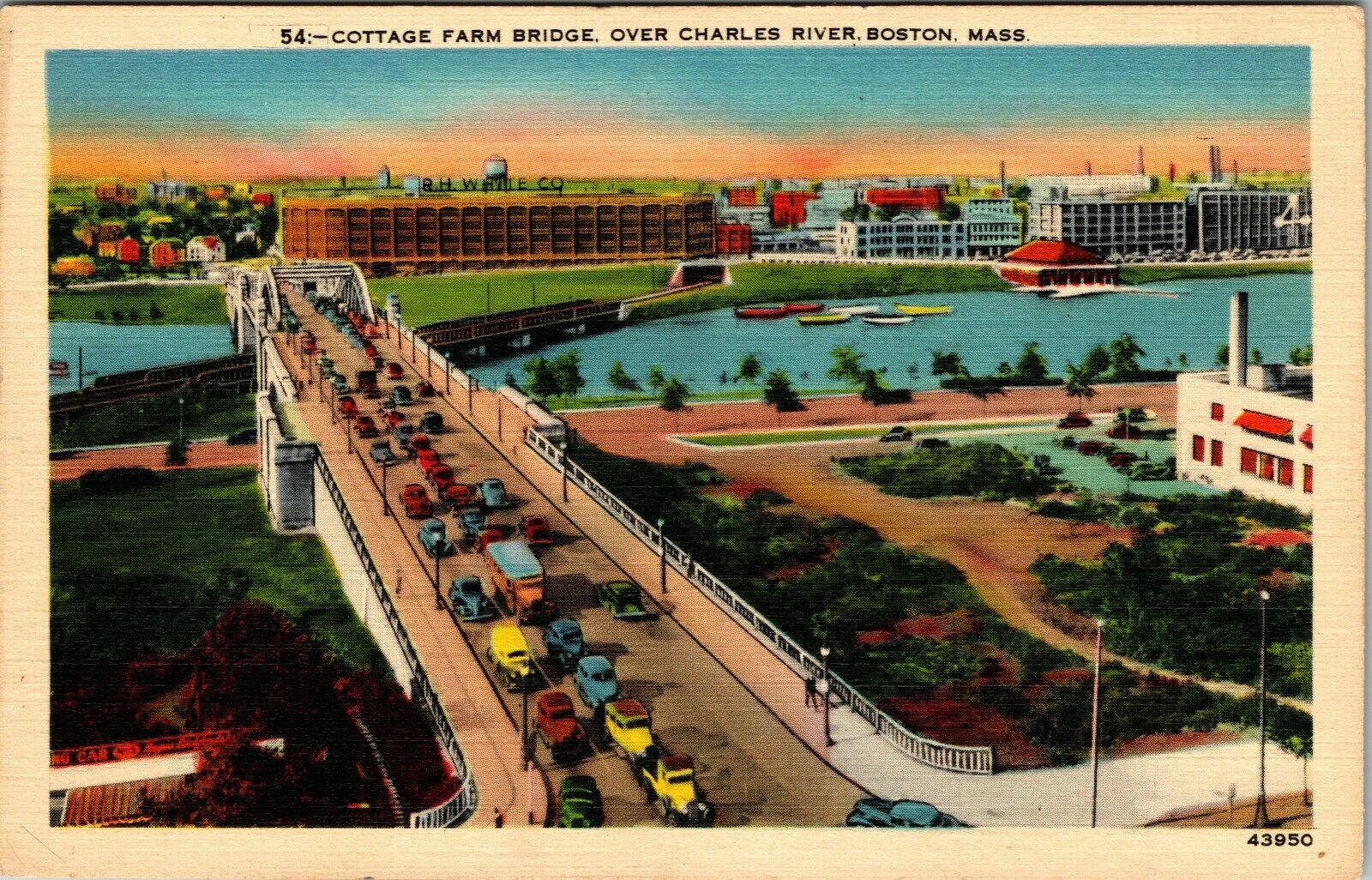
Circa-1930-to-1945 postcard of the bridge

The Boston University Bridge was designed by Andrew Canzanelli and built by The Phoenix Bridge Company in 1927, replacing an 1850s drawbridge known as the Brookline Bridge. Canzanelli also designed the Weeks footbridge and the first shell constructed on the Esplanade.

In 1949 it was renamed for Boston University, which lies at the southern end of the bridge, after a group of students went to the State House to propose a name change. State Senator John E. Powers sponsored the legislation in May 1949; it passed unanimously.

During the period of planning for the Inner Belt, the BU Bridge represented the planned crossing point of the highway from Boston to Cambridge. Several plans were discussed for the area; had the expressway been built over the river, the bridge would have been demolished and replaced with a high-level highway overpass, while if the road had been constructed as a tunnel, the bridge would have been left standing as a crossing for surface route traffic.

The bridge crosses diagonally over an older, now single-tracked railroad-only bridge carrying the Grand Junction Line. This bridge, formerly owned by CSX Transportation, was purchased by the Commonwealth of Massachusetts for the MBTA in 2010. The long-postponed Urban Ring mass transit project is expected to include a bridge at or near this location to carry the planned route across the Charles River.

=== Rehabilitation ===
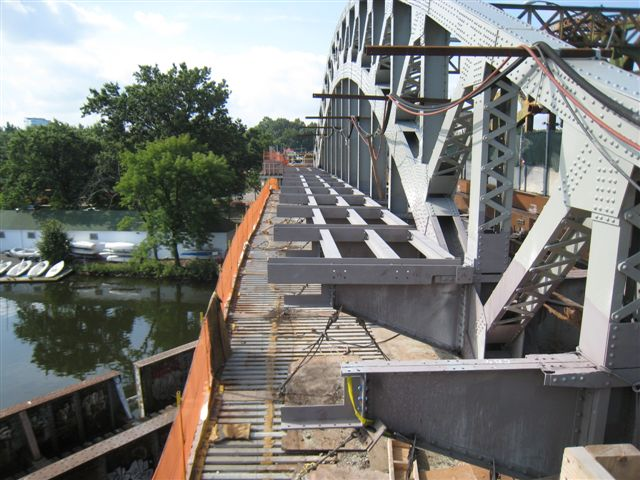
The bridge in 2010 during rehabilitation

In 2008, the bridge deck, including the sidewalks and vehicular surface, was in severe disrepair; the water below was visible through holes in the deck, and the iron stairs leading from Storrow Drive were rusted through. These deficiencies triggered the bridge to be categorized as "structurally deficient" under the federal NBIS standards. Nevertheless, the main structural elements of the bridge have been determined to be sound.

The approximately $20 million rehabilitation project was among the first undertaken in the Commonwealth's Accelerated Bridge Program by the bridge owner, the Department of Conservation and Recreation.

In June 2008, one traffic lane and the west-side sidewalk was closed to begin this work. The project was done in 3 phases to keep traffic open throughout construction. On December 21, 2011, the project was substantially complete, and the bridge was opened in its final configuration, with one lane entering the bridge in each direction, transitioning on the bridge to two lanes exiting. Two 5-foot bike lines are provided alongside the sidewalks.
