= Grand Junction Railroad Bridge =

Charles River overpass

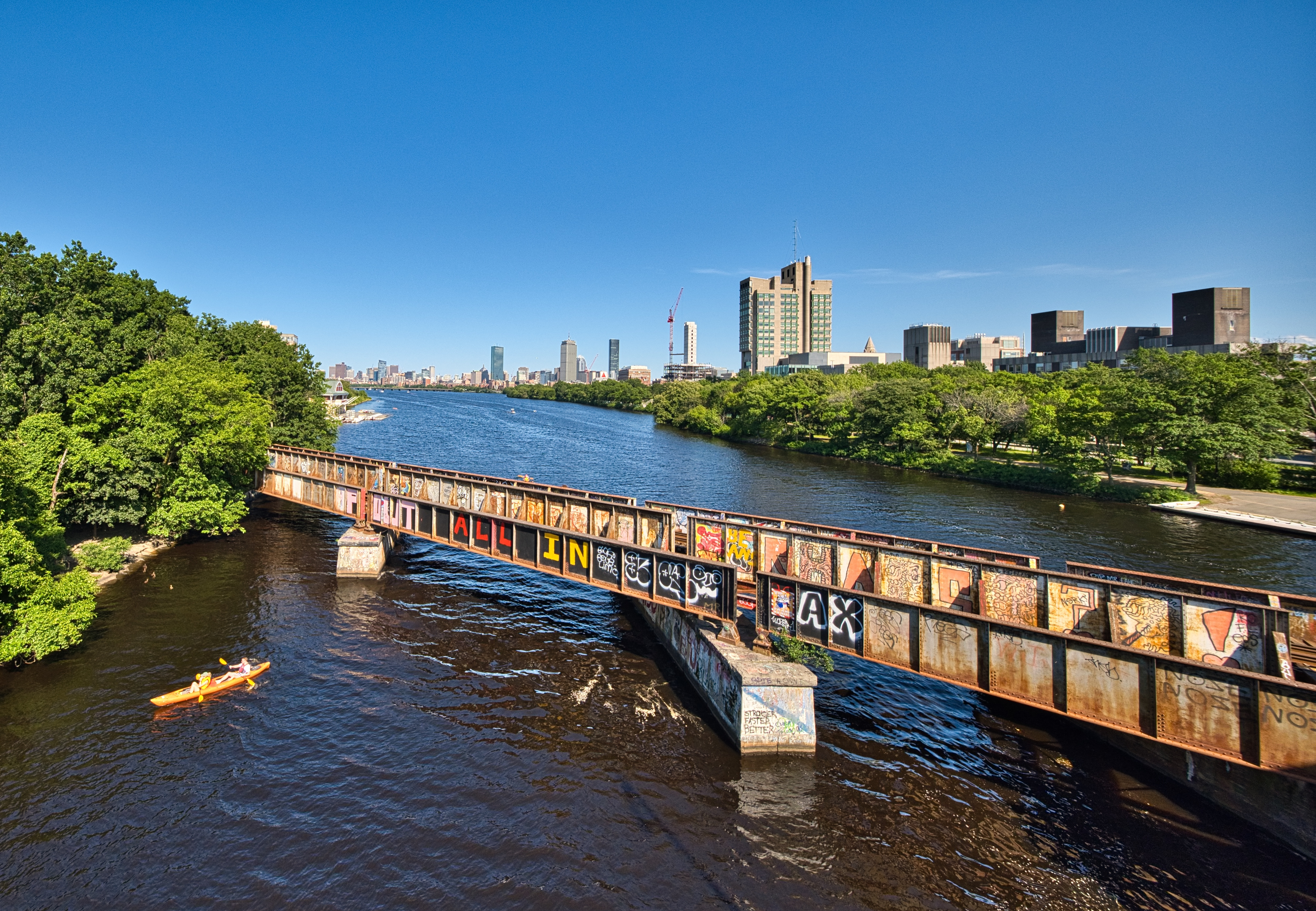
- The bridge viewed from the BU Bridge in 2021
- Coordinates: 42°21′9.39″N 71°6′37.25″W
- Carries: Grand Junction Branch
- Crosses: Charles River
- Locale: Boston, Massachusetts to Cambridge, Massachusetts

Characteristics
- Design: Plate girder bridge
- Material: Steel

History
- Opened: 1927

The Grand Junction Railroad Bridge is a steel plate girder bridge that carries the Grand Junction Railroad over the Charles River in Boston. It connects the Boston University campus to Cambridgeport. In September 2009, Massachusetts finalized an agreement to purchase several CSX rail lines in eastern Massachusetts, including the Grand Junction tracks from the Beacon Park Yard in Allston through Cambridge. The deal was closed on June 17, 2010.

== Repairs ==
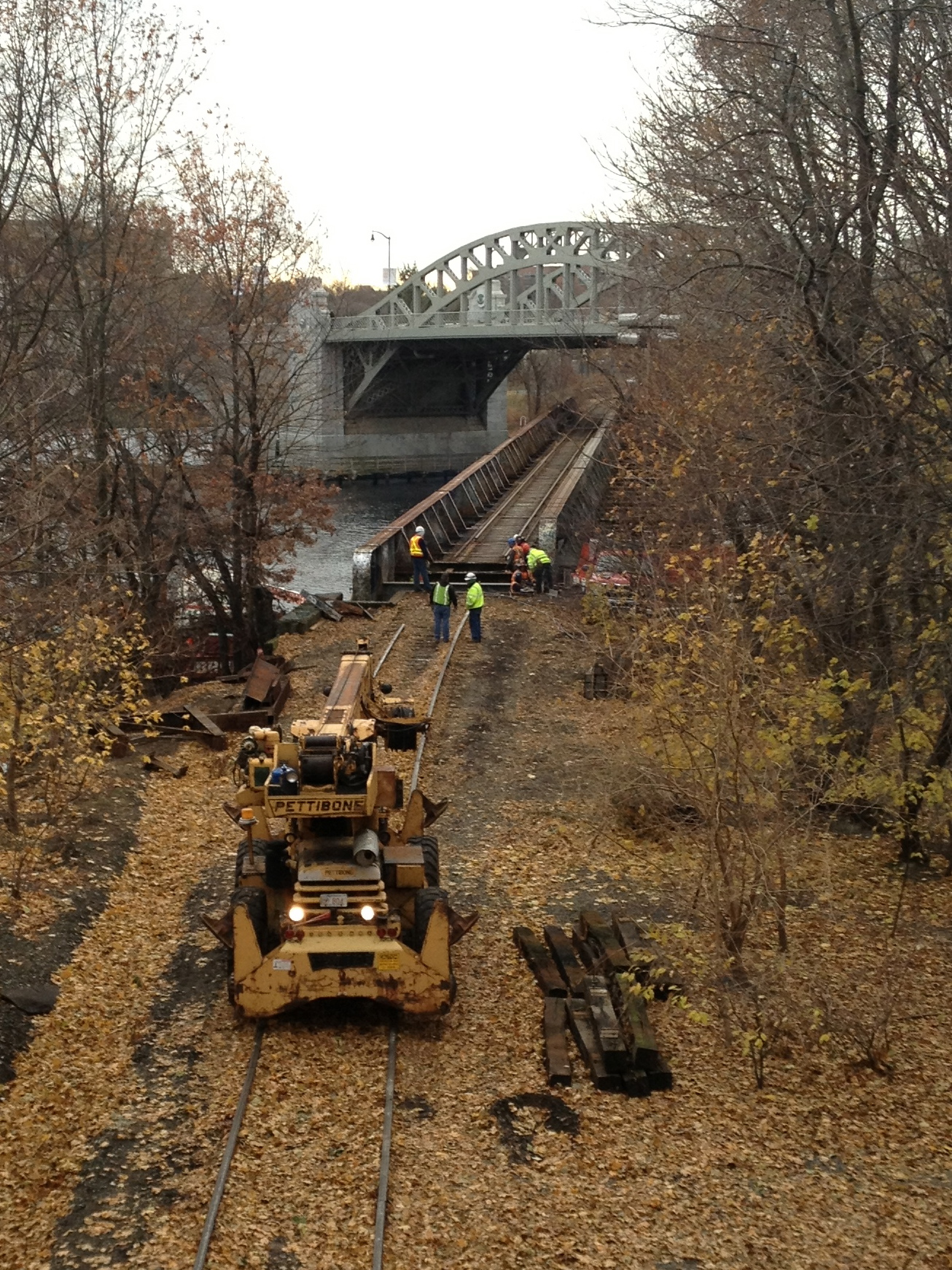
Repair work on the Grand Junction Bridge in November, 2012

On November 21, 2012, the Grand Junction Railroad Bridge was closed to all rail traffic due to its poor condition. This was a change from a restriction put in place days earlier, on November 16, which barred freight trains from crossing, as well as restricting MBTA and Amtrak equipment moves to 5 miles per hour (8 km/h). While emergency repairs were under way, trains moving between the north and south sides of Boston had to be routed via Pan Am Railways trackage between Ayer, Massachusetts and Worcester, Massachusetts (a detour over 100 miles [160 km] in length). The bridge reopened in early January 2013, but was closed again in March for major structural repairs, reopening again in June.

== See also ==
- List of crossings of the Charles River
