= River Street Bridge (Charles River) =

Bridge in Boston, Massachusetts

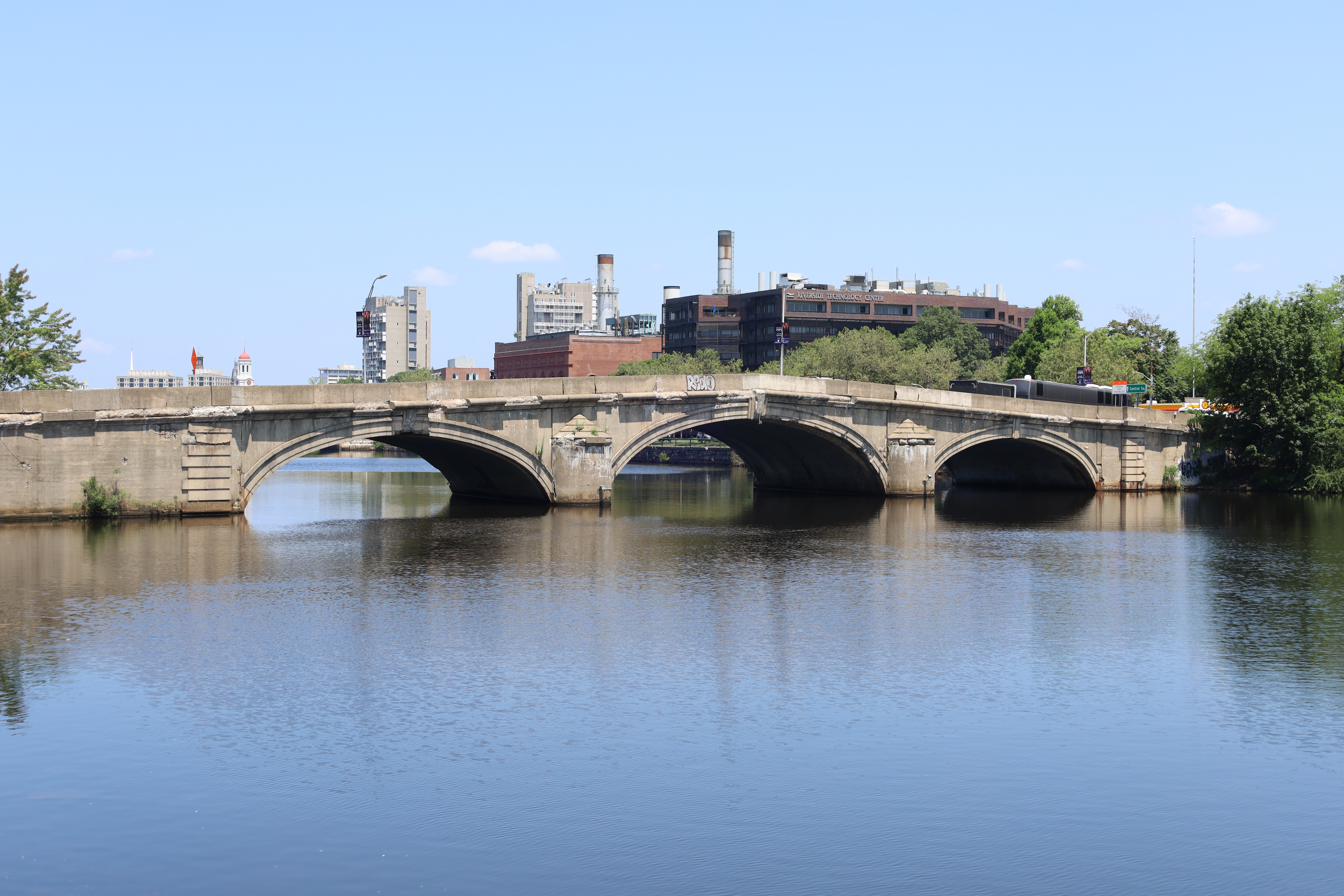
- The River Street Bridge in 2023
- Coordinates: 42.36123°N 71.11670°W
- Carries: east-bound traffic on River Street to Cambridge Street
- Crosses: Charles River
- Locale: Cambridge, Massachusetts to Allston, Boston, Massachusetts
- Maintained by: Massachusetts Department of Transportation

Characteristics
- Design: arch bridge
- No. of spans: 3 arches, 330 feet

History
- Opened: 1925

Location
- Interactive map of River Street Bridge

The River Street Bridge is a bridge on the Charles River in Boston, Massachusetts, connecting River Street in Cambridge to Cambridge Street in Allston near the southern end of the Harvard University campus. It was built in 1925 by the Commonwealth of Massachusetts Metropolitan District Commission.

The bridge carries one-way traffic going east, into Cambridge. Westbound traffic must take the nearby Western Avenue Bridge.

== History ==
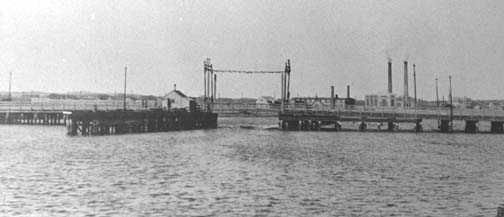
The old Cambridge Street Bridge in 1910. This bridge was demolished to make way for the current bridge.

The original bridge at the site, a wooden drawbridge, was built in 1810. The bridge was built in response to the 1793 construction of the West Boston Bridge (at the site of the current Longfellow Bridge), which greatly shortened the route from Boston to Cambridge, which previously had to take a highway around the Back Bay through Roxbury.

The current reinforced-concrete bridge was constructed in 1925 with three arches that span 330 feet. It was designed by Robert P. Bellows in a style resembling the Pont Neuf in Paris.
