= Grand Junction Railroad =

Connecting railroad in the Boston, Massachusetts area

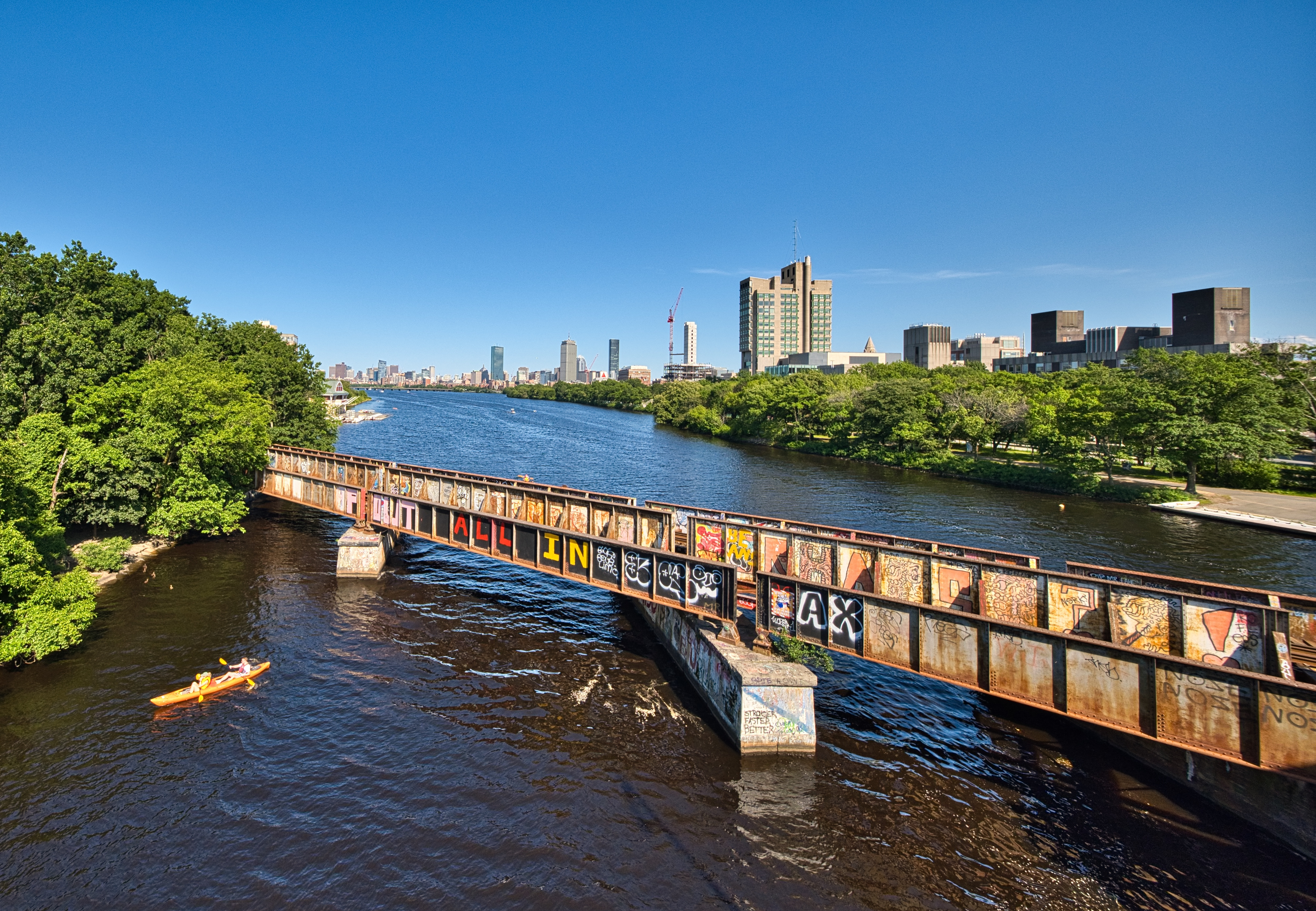
- The Grand Junction Railroad Bridge over the Charles River

Overview
- Locale: Boston, Massachusetts
- Termini: East Boston Terminal; Beacon Park Yard

Technical
- Line length: 8.55 mi (13.76 km)
- Track gauge: 4 ft 8 1/2 in (1,435 mm) standard gauge
- Loading gauge: Minimal Plate B

The Grand Junction Railroad was an 8.55-mile (13.76 km) long railroad in the Boston, Massachusetts, area, connecting the railroads heading west and north from Boston. The western portion between Beacon Park Yard in Boston and the Inner Belt District in Somerville is still in use as the Grand Junction Branch. The eastern portion between the Inner Belt and the East Boston wharves has largely been abandoned; portions have been reused for a busway, a bypass road, and a rail trail.

== Early history ==
The railroad (full name Grand Junction Railroad and Depot Company) was chartered April 24, 1847, to connect the railroads entering Boston from the north and west with its wharves in East Boston. This was a rechartering of the Chelsea Branch Railroad, incorporated April 10, 1846.

The first section to open was from East Boston to the Boston and Maine Railroad in Somerville, opened in 1849. It began at a huge waterfront yard complex on Boston Harbor, occupying the space east of the Eastern Railroad terminal and west of the Boston, Revere Beach and Lynn Railroad terminal. The line headed north with two tracks (minimum) just east of the Eastern Railroad's line, crossing at-grade and splitting to the west just south of Curtis Street, with a crossover track between the two lines south of the crossing (allowing Eastern Railroad trains from their terminal to use the Grand Junction). In 1905, the Grand Junction Railroad in East Boston was rebuilt into a below-grade two-track line, and the Eastern Railroad line was truncated to just north of the split.

In March 1852 the line was leased to the Eastern Railroad between the B&M in Somerville and Salem Turnpike (now called Broadway) in Chelsea. The Eastern Railroad, then ending in East Boston, used the line for downtown Boston access, building a cutoff in 1854 from their main line to the Grand Junction in Chelsea, and building a new line splitting from the Grand Junction just west of the B&M and B&L Mystic River Branch crossing and running just west of the B&M into downtown. The Saugus Branch Railroad, bought by the Eastern April 30, 1852, was realigned in 1855 at its south end to feed into the Grand Junction rather than the B&M.

The rest of the line was built in 1856, connecting to the Boston and Worcester Railroad in Allston, now part of Boston. Instead of merging with the Fitchburg Railroad, it continued west along its north side for a bit (passing under the Boston and Lowell Railroad's new alignment) before turning south, crossing the Fitchburg Railroad at-grade onto its own alignment through Cambridge. A track connection was provided with the Fitchburg Railroad, connecting the East Boston-bound Grand Junction to the Fitchburg-bound Fitchburg.

The line was reorganized as the East Boston Freight Railroad in 1862, and the Boston and Albany bought the property in 1869. It passed with the B&A into larger companies - the New York Central Railroad, Penn Central and Conrail. On February 28, 1955, the counterweight fell off the Chelsea Creek drawbridge, taking the bridge permanently out of service; subsequently B&A trains reached East Boston from Chelsea using B&M trackage rights via Revere. B&A service to East Boston ended around 1972.

A small footnote is the Union Railroad, which was incorporated May 10, 1848, for the same purpose, and was authorized to merge with the Grand Junction February 25, 1854.

== Western segment ==
The western segment is still in use for CSX freight traffic for the Schnitzer scrap yard on the Everett waterfront. or freight to the Chelsea Produce Market, It is also used by the MBTA to transfer southside commuter rail equipment to and from the MBTA Commuter Rail Maintenance Facility, and by Amtrak to transfer Downeaster equipment to and from Southampton Street Yard. The track loading gauge is the minimal Plate B. The section of line is owned by MassDOT, although MIT owns the land of two segments with an easement for rail use.

=== Route ===
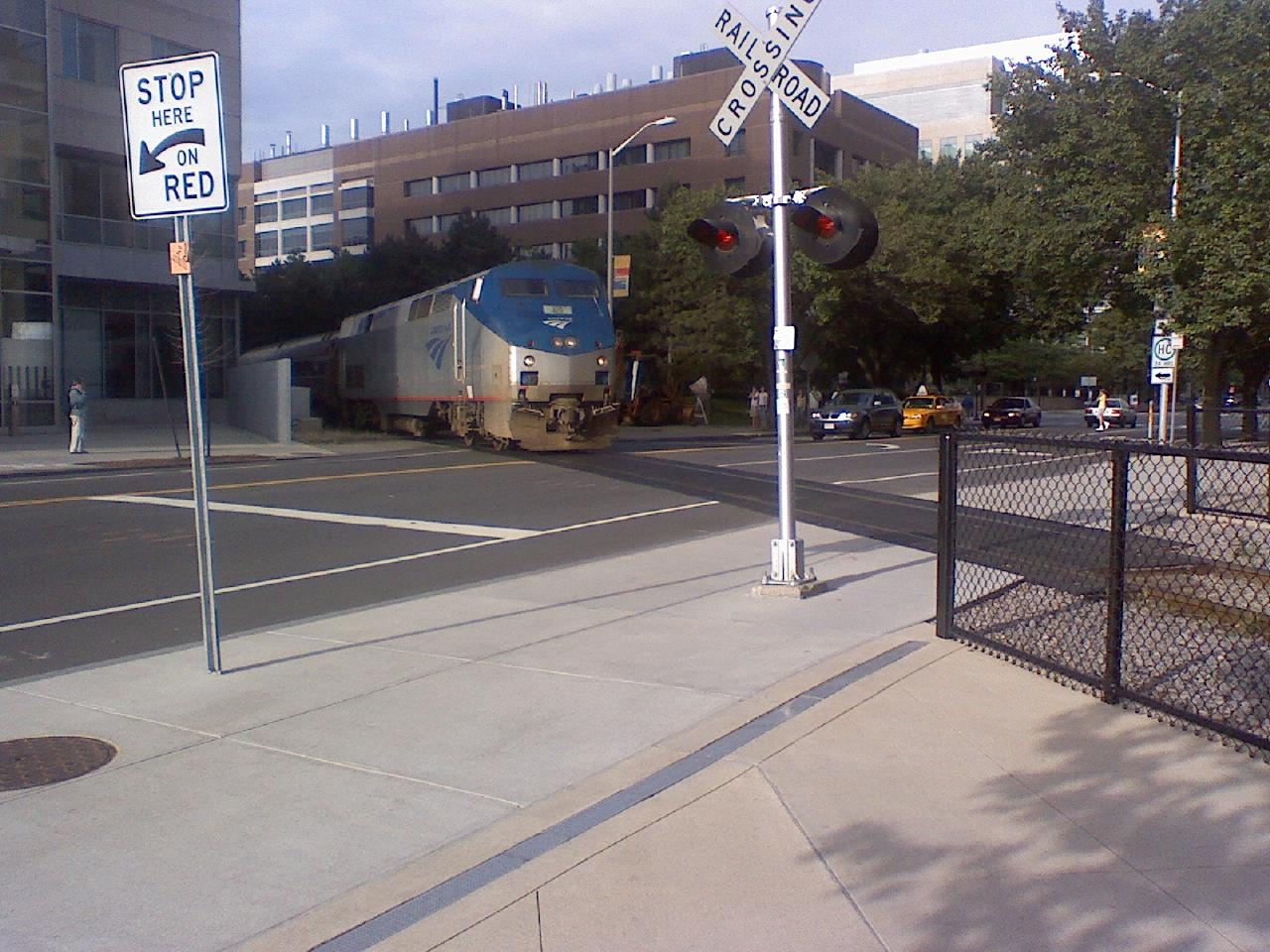
An Amtrak Genesis locomotive crosses Main Street in Cambridge.

The section of the Grand Junction between the now vacated Beacon Park Yard and the Fitchburg Line lies mainly in Cambridge, with short sections in Allston to the west and Somerville to the east.

The line splits from the former Boston and Worcester Railroad (after 1867, the Boston and Albany Railroad) and soon crosses the Charles River diagonally on a bridge on the Grand Junction Railroad Bridge, which also passes underneath the Boston University Bridge (formerly the Essex Street Bridge). It then runs through Cambridge along what was once the shore of the Charles River, and is now a rough border between the main campus of the Massachusetts Institute of Technology and the rest of Cambridge.

From the Fitchburg Line to the Haverhill Line (shared at that point by the Newburyport/Rockport Line), the former Grand Junction is occupied by tracks which allow freight trains to move between the four northside main lines. The Newburyport/Rockport Line parallels the Grand Junction right-of-way from there to Broadway in Chelsea.

In Cambridge it diverges from the former Fitchburg Railroad and crosses under the old B&L mainline (with track connections). It soon crossed the border into Charlestown, part of Boston. The extension crossed the Mystic River Branch of the Boston and Lowell Railroad. Just south of Cambridge Street, the Grand Junction junctioned with and crossed the B&M. It then runs along the east side of the former Boston and Maine Railroad's main line towards Boston. After crossing the Mystic River, it passes through outlying areas of Everett and north of downtown Chelsea.

In Everett, freight yard tracks now occupy the Grand Junction right of way.

=== History ===
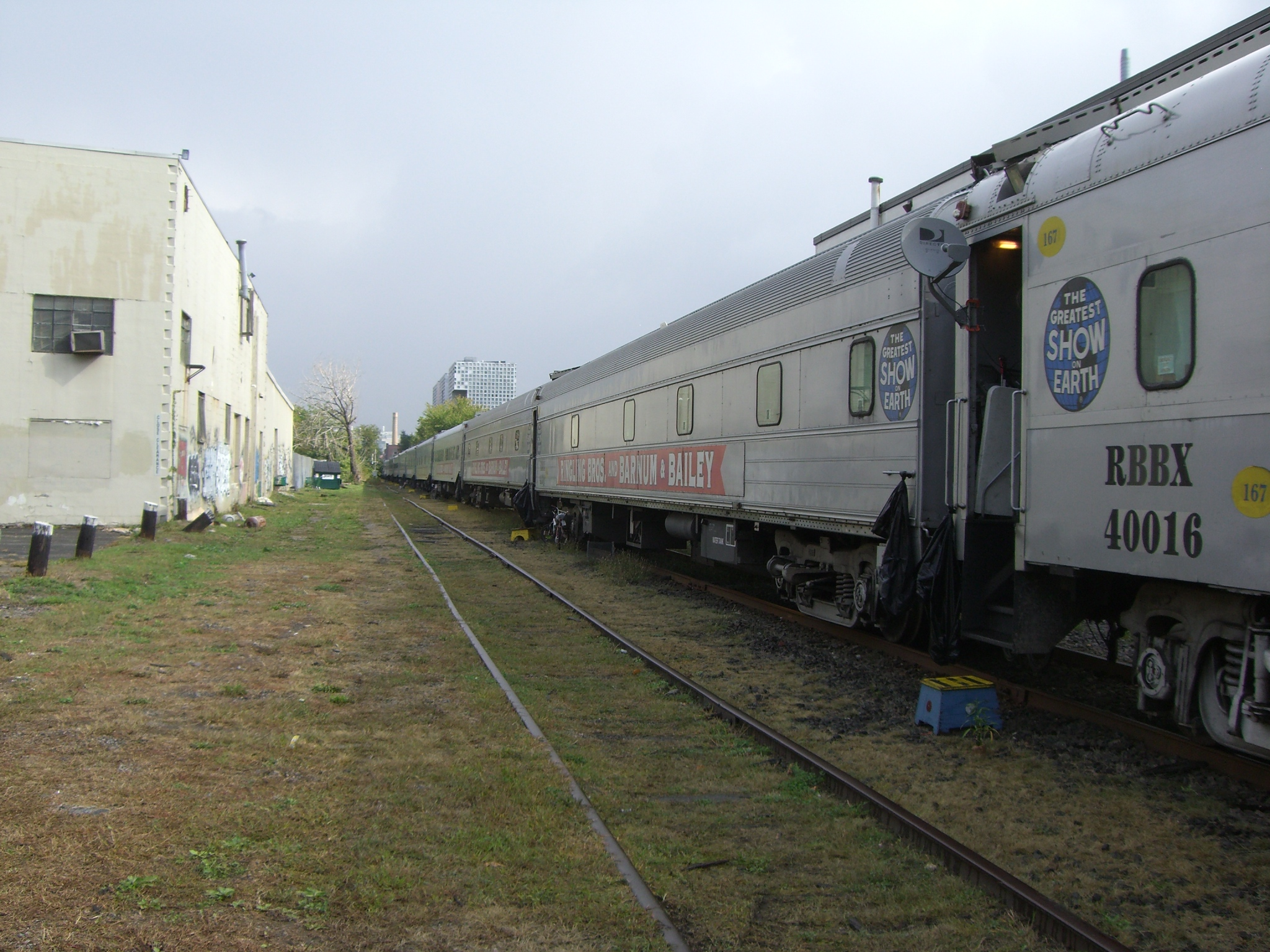
Circus Train on the Grand Junction in 2007

Until 2018, CSX Transportation operated one daily freight to the New England Produce Center and scrap yards in Everett. The Barnum and Bailey Circus train often parked on the Grand Junction while the circus was in Boston.

On October 2, 2008, the state government announced an agreement with CSX Transportation for the purchase and upgrade of several of CSX's freight lines in the state, including the western section of the Grand Junction. The agreement was signed on September 23, 2009. A first closing on June 11, 2010, transferred dispatching control of the line from CSX to the MBTA's commuter rail operator. The second closing on October 4, 2012, transferred ownership of the Grand Junction and several other important lines to the state, completing the $100 million deal.

On November 16, 2012, Amtrak and MBTA equipment moves were limited to 5 miles per hour (8.0 km/h) over the Grand Junction Railroad Bridge, and freight traffic was not allowed to use the bridges. On November 21, the bridge was closed to all rail traffic due to its poor condition. While emergency repairs were under way, trains moving between the north and south sides of Boston had to be routed via Pan Am Railways trackage between Ayer and Worcester, a lengthy detour. The bridge reopened in early January 2013, but was closed again from March to June for additional structural repairs.

The City of Cambridge has done a feasibility study concerning adding a "rail with trail" multi-use path to be known as the Grand Junction Community Path from the Charles River Bike Paths at the Boston University Bridge, through MIT, paralleling Cardinal Medeiros Way northeast of Kendall Square, and connecting to the Somerville Community Path near Twin City Plaza.

=== Proposals for more western service ===
The "locally preferred alternative" for the Urban Ring project as of June 2008 calls for routing bus rapid transit along the Grand Junction right-of-way, from George Washington Park in Cambridgeport, over the Charles River. The existing railroad bridge would be widened to add lanes for buses and the path.

In 2010, Lieutenant Governor Tim Murray publicly discussed branching the Framingham/Worcester Line over the Grand Junction to provide MBTA Commuter Rail service from Worcester to North Station.

In December 2011, the Massachusetts Department of Transportation announced that "is not pursuing the use of the Grand Junction for increased MBTA Commuter Rail service at this point," opting instead to expand South Station, which would allow more service from Worcester without the need for a North Station route. It further stated: "However, expanding Boston South Station is an enormously complex and expensive project without a specific timeframe. Should the need for increased Commuter Rail capacity become overwhelming in the period prior to the expansion of South Station, MassDOT might reopen the Grand Junction discussion. The use of Grand Junction for Commuter Rail service could meet some of the needs to be provided by an expanded South Station, at much lower cost and with much less time and complexity."

The Grand Junction would have been used to carry ethanol by rail to a tank farm in Revere as one of three route options considered in a proposal that underwent state safety and environmental review in 2013. Unit trains consisting of perhaps 60 tank cars would have run at night to deliver the gasoline additive. In the face of community opposition and pressure from the state legislature, the company withdrew its proposal on July 2, 2013, days before the Lac-Mégantic rail disaster.

In 2014, the western part of the line was included in a proposal to connect a proposed West Station with North Station, with the creation of an additional infill station on the line in Cambridge.

In October 2024, the Cambridge Redevelopment Authority (CRA) released a detailed engineering feasibility study of such a transit connection. The study was conducted on behalf of the CRA as part of developer Boston Properties's efforts to mitigate its development project in Kendall Square. The study determined that "urban rail" using electric multiple units (EMUs) or battery electric multiple units (BEMUs) was the most feasible mode. The "Core Route", between West Station and North Station, would cost between $378.28 million and $667.26 million (depending on whether 2-car or 4-car sets are used, and whether EMUs or BEMUs are used); while an "Extended Route" connecting to Everett, Chelsea, Revere and Lynn, would cost between $515.9 million and $1,254.03 million. The Core Route, which would have four new stations (including West Station), could receive 6,500–11,200 daily boardings per day by 2040.

== Eastern segment ==
Most of the eastern segment no longer hosts rail traffic, but the right-of-way has been repurposed for multiple uses. The portion between the Mystic River and 2nd Street in Everett remains in use as freight lead tracks.

=== Silver Line SL3 ===
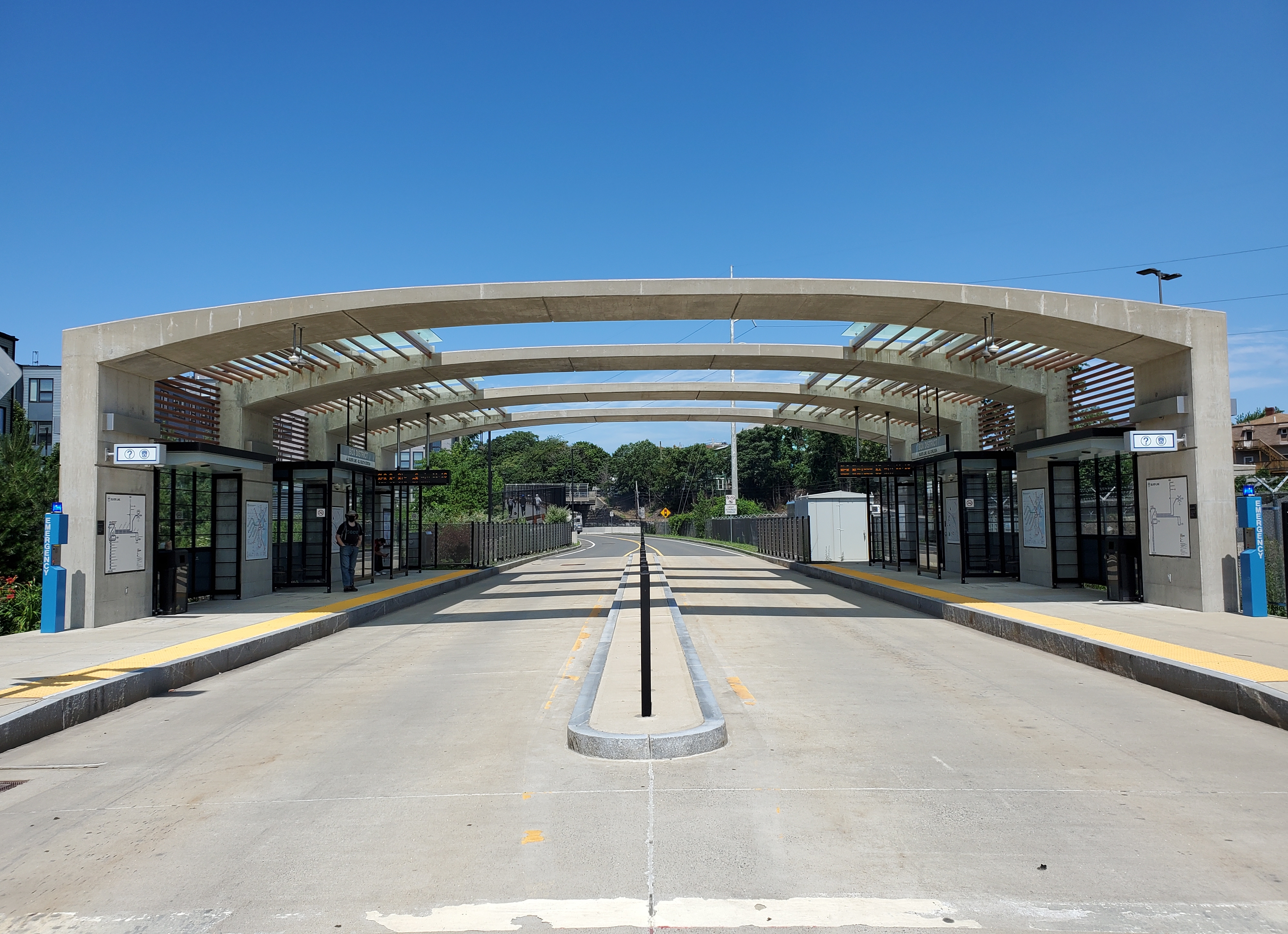
Box District station on the busway

In October 2013, after several months of planning, MassDOT announced funding to convert the section from Eastern Avenue to Sixth Street into a Silver Line busway and a parallel $3 million multi-use greenway.

In Chelsea, the Silver Line Gateway (SL3 line) busway has been constructed from Everett Avenue to Eastern Avenue. CSX filed to abandon the section from 2nd Street in Everett to Saratoga Street in East Boston in 2002; the abandonment process was still under way when that segment was included in the 2009 agreement. By the 2010 and 2012 closings, an additional segment to the west in Everett was included in the sale to MassDOT. Silver Line service to Chelsea (route SL3) began on April 21, 2018.

=== Martin A. Coughlin Bypass Road ===
The Grand Junction railroad bridge over Chelsea Creek has been removed. The section from Curtis Street to Lovell Street was transferred to Massport ownership and converted into the Martin A. Coughlin Bypass Road, a two-lane route for commercial traffic to and from Logan Airport that opened on November 26, 2012.

=== Bremen Street Park and East Boston Greenway ===
Conrail abandoned the line between Lovell Street and the East Boston docks in the 1970s. The former rail yards north of Route 1A were used as a private "Park'N'Fly" lot for Logan Airport. In 1989, the Massachusetts Highway Department began proceedings to acquire the land by eminent domain as part of the Big Dig project. Since the Third Harbor Tunnel would bring additional traffic to Logan Airport, the site was to be converted to a public park, in partial restitution for the 1969 destruction of Wood Island Park for airport expansion. After a lengthy scandal over the proposed land taking (and later land swap) that sent Speaker of the Massachusetts House of Representatives Charles Flaherty to jail and implicated others including U.S. Representative Bud Shuster, Massport purchased the land outright in 2001. In 2007, Bremen Street Park opened on the site.

The remaining section to the south lay unused. Residents tried to clean up the tracks for use as a greenbelt in 1978, although local business leaders desired to reuse it as a haul road. Conrail donated that section to The Trust for Public Land in 1997. In 2007, after eight years of construction, the East Boston Greenway was opened on the corridor.
