= Western Avenue Bridge =

Bridge in Boston, Massachusetts

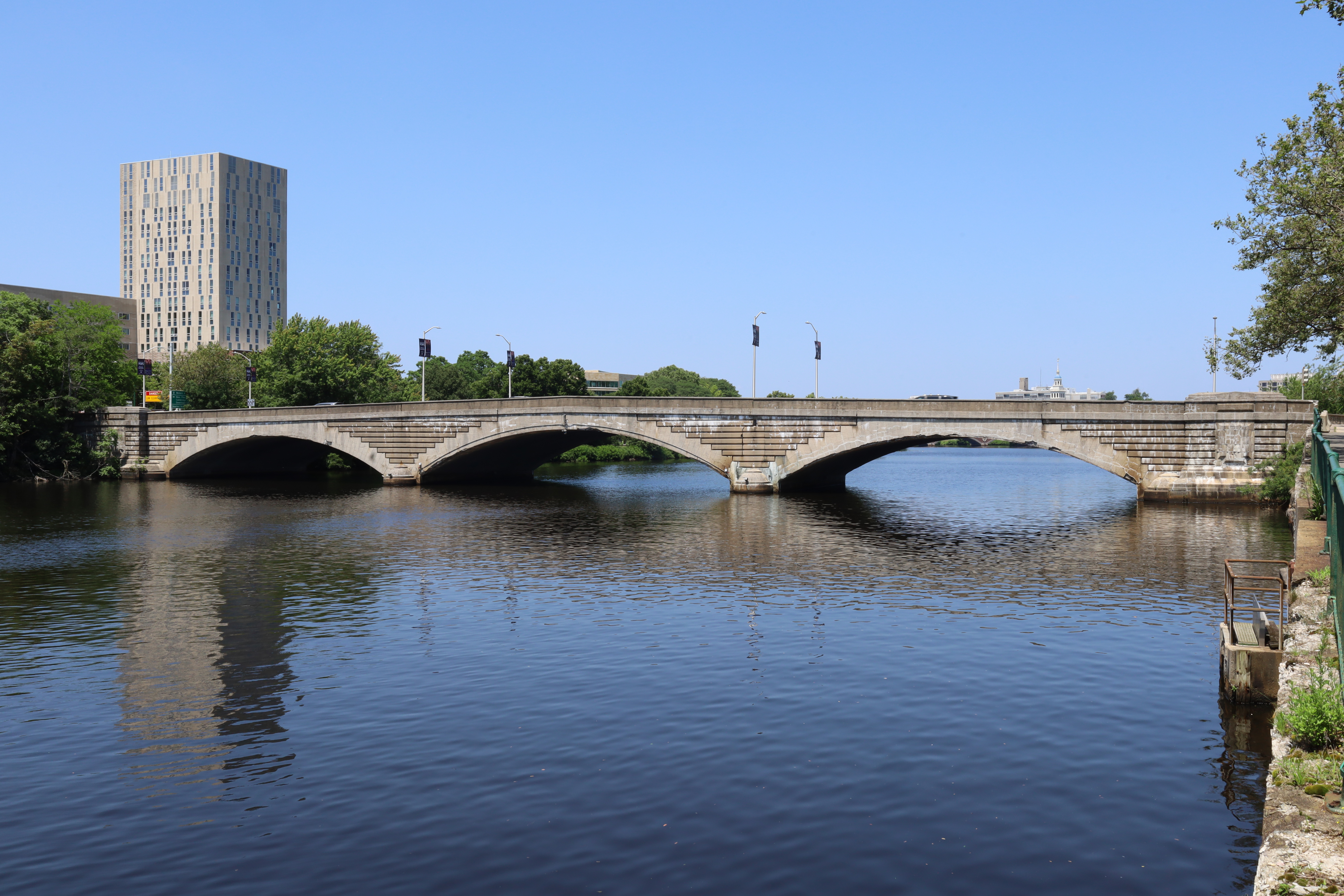
- The Western Avenue Bridge in 2023
- Coordinates: 42.36422°N 71.11690°W
- Carries: west-bound traffic on Western Avenue
- Crosses: Charles River
- Locale: Cambridge, Massachusetts to Allston, Boston, Massachusetts
- Maintained by: Massachusetts Department of Transportation

Characteristics
- Design: arch bridge

History
- Opened: 1924

The Western Avenue Bridge is a bridge carrying Western Avenue over the Charles River between Cambridge and Allston, Massachusetts. It was built in 1924 by the Commonwealth of Massachusetts Metropolitan District Commission.

The bridge carries one-way traffic going west, into Allston. Eastbound traffic must take the nearby River Street Bridge.

== History ==
The original bridge on the site was the River Street Bridge (not to be confused with the modern River Street Bridge just down the river) constructed in 1824.
