= Medford branch =

Medford branch may refer to:

- Medford branch (Boston and Maine Railroad)
- Medford branch, Green Line Extension
- Medford branch, West Jersey and Seashore Railroad
