= Wade House =

Wade House can refer to:

- Wade House (Ipswich, Massachusetts)
- Jonathan Wade House, Medford, Massachusetts
- William Lincoln Wade House, Salem, Oregon, listed on the National Register of Historic Places (NRHP)
- Dwight and Kate Wade House, Sevierville, Tennessee, listed on the NRHP
- Alexander Wade House, Morgantown, West Virginia
- Wade House Historic Site, Greenbush, Wisconsin
  - Sylvanus Wade House the core building of the site
