= Mystic station =

Mystic Station or Mystic station could refer to:

- Mystic station (Connecticut), an Amtrak train station in Connecticut
- Mystic Generating Station, a power station in Massachusetts
- Mystic Water Works, a pumping station in Massachusetts
