= Jonathan Fletcher =

Jonathan Fletcher may refer to:

- Jonathon Fletcher, English programmer of JumpStation in 1993, considered the "father of the search engine"

== See also ==
- Jonathan Fletcher House, historic building in Massachusetts, United States, built c.1835 by another Jonathan Fletcher
