= Medford Pipe Bridge =

- U.S. National Register of Historic Places
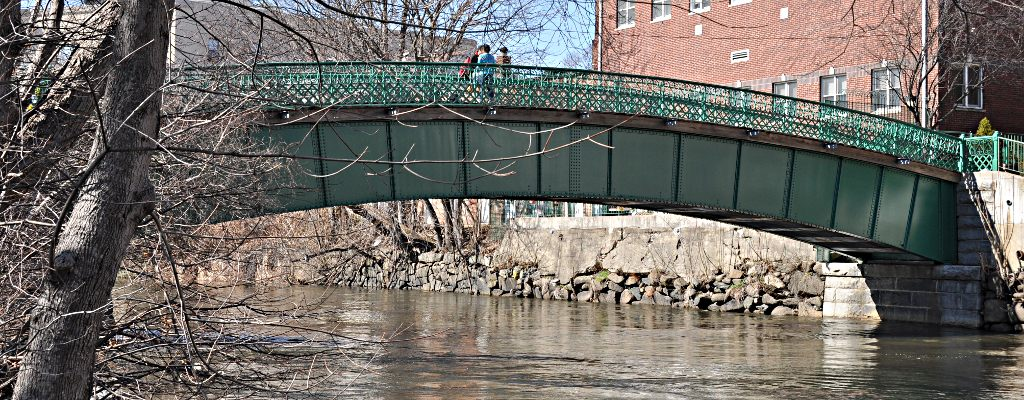

- Location within Massachusetts Location within the United States
- Location: Medford, Massachusetts
- Coordinates: 42°25′6″N 71°6′44″W
- Built: 1897
- Architect: New Jersey Steel & Iron Co.
- MPS: Water Supply System of Metropolitan Boston MPS
- NRHP reference No.: 89002253
- Added to NRHP: January 18, 1990

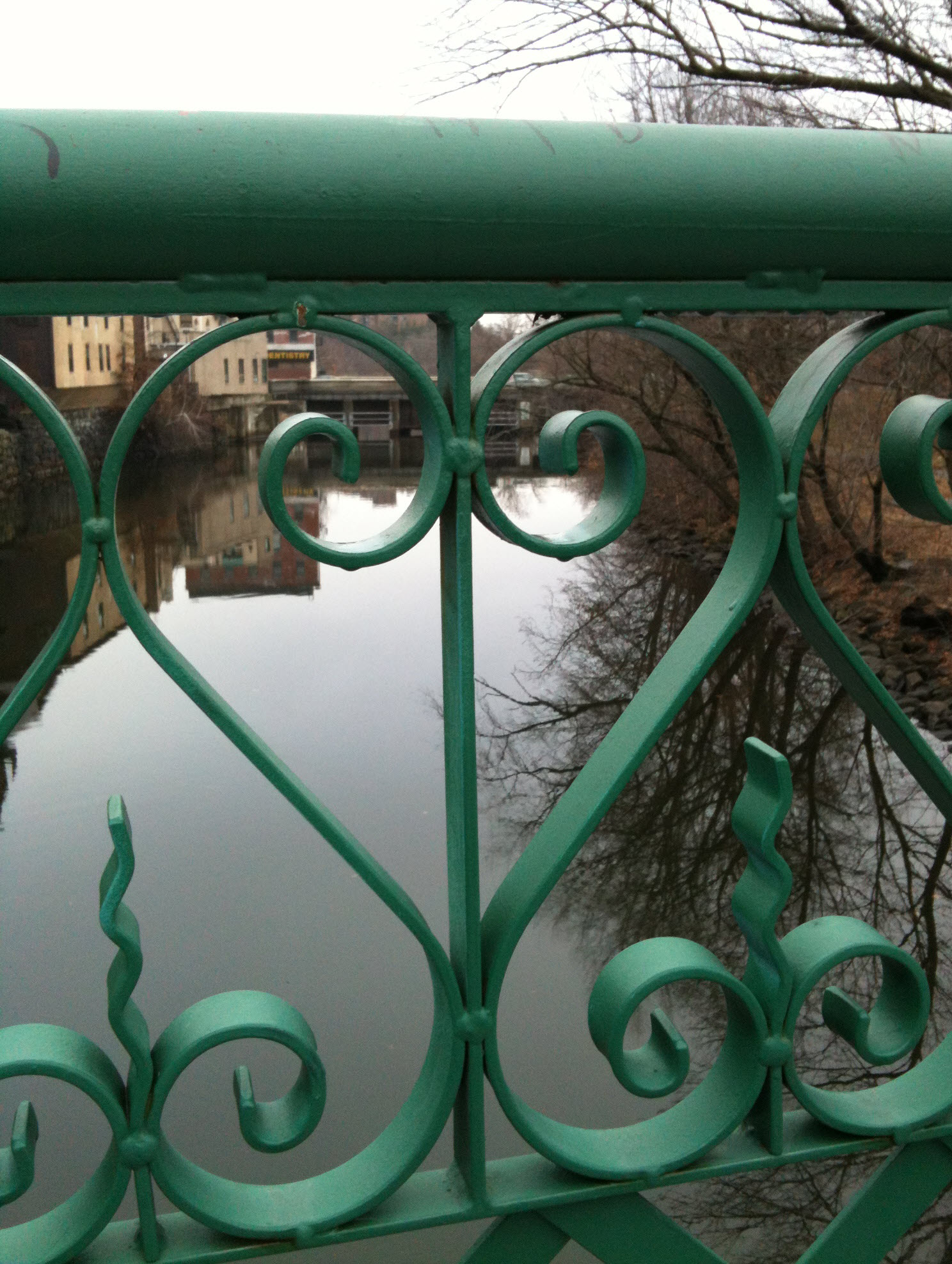
A view of the iron work railing detail of the Medford Pipe Bridge, looking towards the site of the original Cradock Bridge over the Mystic River.

The Medford Pipe Bridge is a historic plate girder pipeline bridge over the Mystic River, between S. Court St. and the Mystic Valley Parkway in Medford, Massachusetts. It was built in 1897 as part of the Metropolitan Water Board's northern high and low service.

The bridge carries a 20" high-service pipe and a 48" low-service pipe between the Chestnut Hill Reservoir and Spot Pond that are cross connected with the Mystic Water Works pumping station in Somerville. The bridge was built by the New Jersey Steel & Iron Company in Trenton, New Jersey, and placed on abutments designed by Cheney & Trumbull. It also carries foot traffic.

The bridge was listed on the National Register of Historic Places in 1990. A postcard ca. 1938 calls it the "Foot Bridge over Mystic River", Medford, Mass.

== See also ==
- List of bridges on the National Register of Historic Places in Massachusetts
- National Register of Historic Places listings in Medford, Massachusetts
- National Register of Historic Places listings in Middlesex County, Massachusetts
