= Joseph K. Manning House =

Historic house in Massachusetts, United States

- U.S. National Register of Historic Places
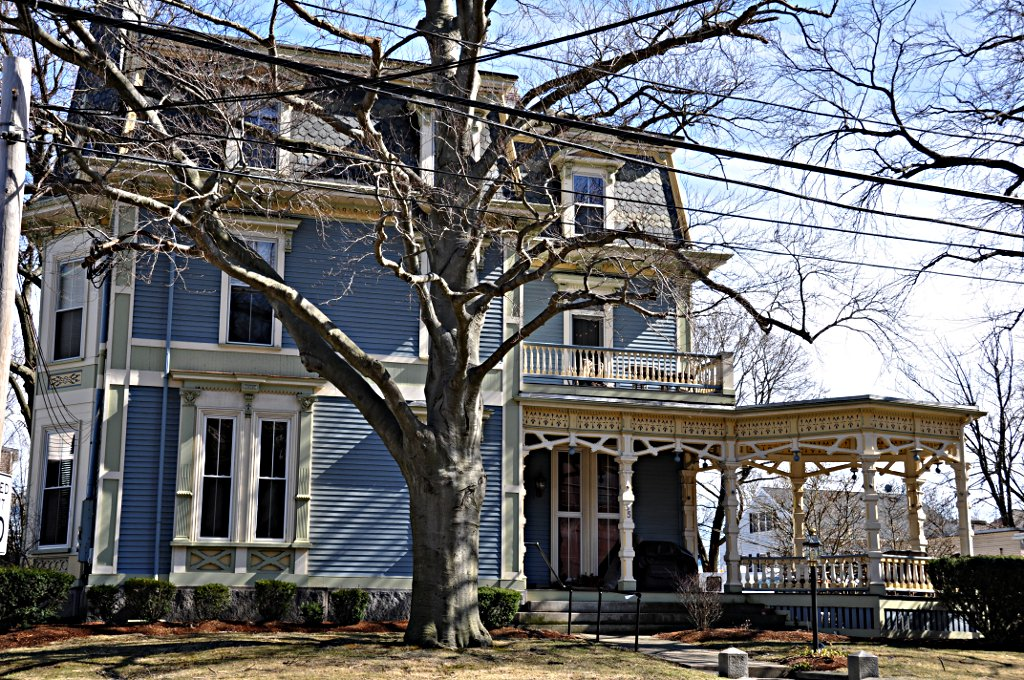

- Location within Massachusetts Location within the United States
- Location: 35–37 Forest Street, Medford, Massachusetts
- Coordinates: 42°25′11″N 71°6′37″W
- Built: 1875
- Architectural style: Second Empire, Stick/Eastlake
- NRHP reference No.: 88000712
- Added to NRHP: April 7, 1989

The Joseph K. Manning House is a historic house in Medford, Massachusetts. Built in 1875, this three story wood-frame house is the most elaborate Second Empire house in the city. The most prominent feature of this architecturally complex building is a hexagonal pavilion attached to its porch at the western corner. It has an elaborate jigsaw-cut frieze and Stick style decorative woodwork, with a balustrade with heavy turned balusters. The house's mansard roof is shingled in multiple bands of colored slate, and pierced by pedimented dormers. At the upper roof line there is iron cresting. The house was built for Joseph King Manning, the son of a wealthy lumber dealer.

The house was listed on the National Register of Historic Places in 1989.

== See also ==
- National Register of Historic Places listings in Medford, Massachusetts
- National Register of Historic Places listings in Middlesex County, Massachusetts
