= John H. McGill House =

Historic house in Massachusetts, United States

- U.S. National Register of Historic Places
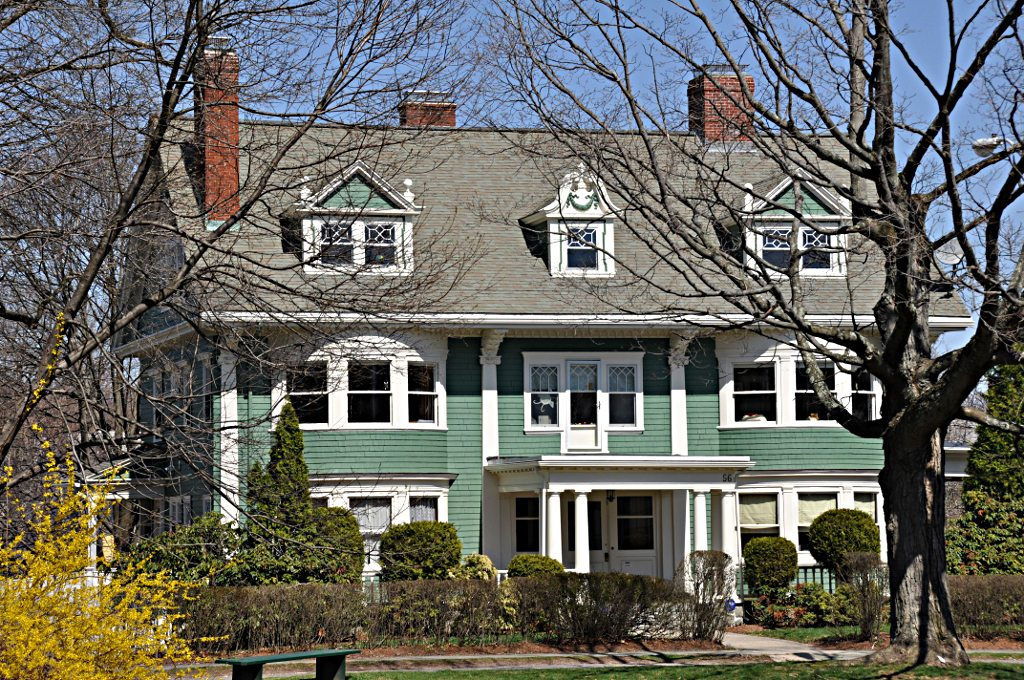

- Location within Massachusetts Location within the United States
- Location: Medford, Massachusetts
- Coordinates: 42°25′28″N 71°7′41″W
- Area: less than one acre
- Built: 1902
- Architect: Robert Coit
- Architectural style: Colonial Revival
- NRHP reference No.: 80000640
- Added to NRHP: April 9, 1980

The John H. McGill House is a historic house at 56 Vernon Street in Medford, Massachusetts. Built in 1902 to a design by local architect Robert Coit, it is one of the city's finest examples of Colonial Revival architecture. It was listed on the National Register of Historic Places in 1980.

== Description and history ==
The McGill House stands at northwest corner of Vernon and Mystic Streets, on a hill overlooking the village of West Medford and facing a small park. It is a 2 1/2-story wood-frame structure, with a gabled roof, shingled exterior, and stone foundation. The main facade faces south, and is arranged symmetrically into three parts, with pilasters at the corners and between the sections. The outer sections have rounded bays with three windows on each level, and a two-window gabled dormer in the roof above, punctuated by finialed posts at the corners. The center bay has the main entrance, sheltered by a flat-roofed porch supported by grouped Tuscan columns. On the second floor above are group of three rectangular sash windows, arranged in an inverted Palladian form, with upper sashes that have diamond-and-lancet lights.

The house was built in 1902, to a design by regionally known architect Robert Coit. John H. McGill, for whom it was built, was a manufacturer of grindstones whose wealth was reputed to be great because of the elaborate style of his home. This house is the only one in Medford attributed to Coit, who lived in neighboring Winchester. The house's interior is somewhat lavishly appointed, with carved limestone fireplace surrounds and wood paneling.

== See also ==
- National Register of Historic Places listings in Medford, Massachusetts
- National Register of Historic Places listings in Middlesex County, Massachusetts
