= Bigelow Block =

- U.S. National Register of Historic Places
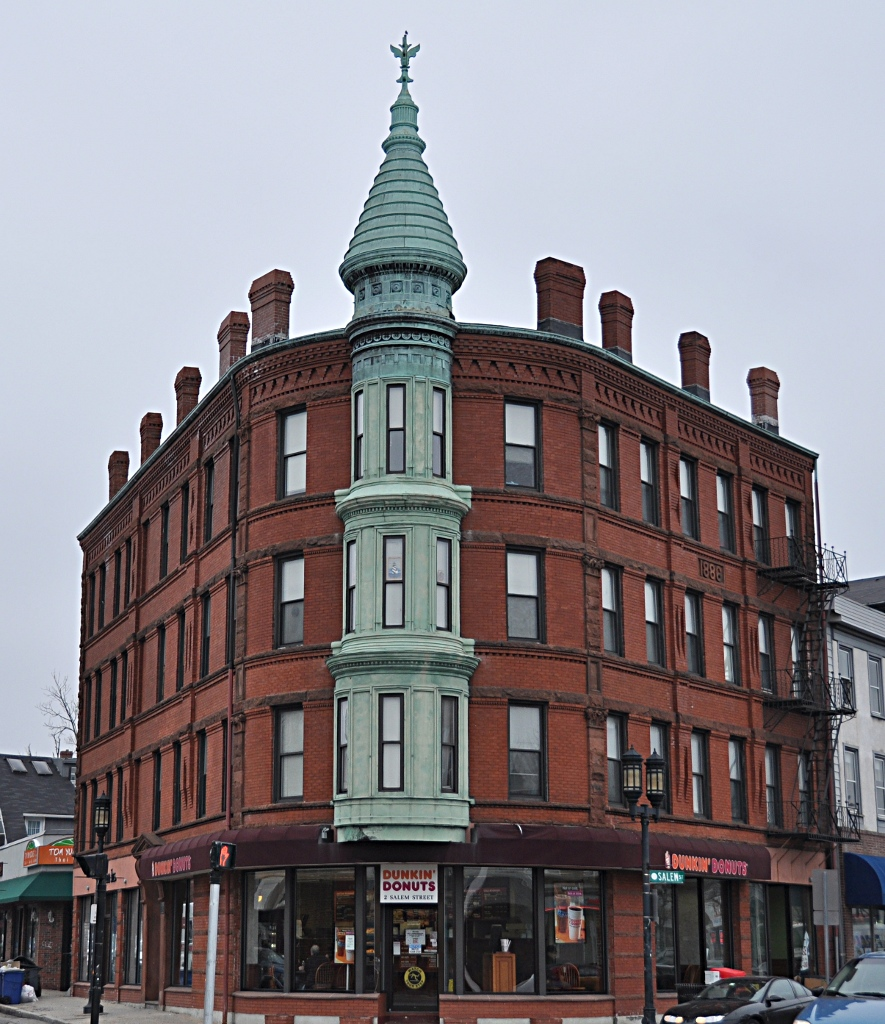

- Location within Massachusetts Location within the United States
- Location: Medford, Massachusetts
- Coordinates: 42°25′6″N 71°6′36″W
- Built: 1886
- Architect: Dunahue Bros.
- Architectural style: Late Victorian
- NRHP reference No.: 75000268
- Added to NRHP: February 24, 1975

The Bigelow Block is a historic commercial and residential building at the corner of Forest and Salem Streets in Medford, Massachusetts. The Victorian block was built in 1886 for the locally prominent Bigelow family; it is a four-story brick building with sandstone trim, terra cotta plaques, and copper-clad turret at the corner. It occupies a prominent position in the center of Medford, and is one of few surviving 19th century commercial buildings in the city.

The building was listed on the National Register of Historic Places in 1975.

== See also ==
- National Register of Historic Places listings in Medford, Massachusetts
- National Register of Historic Places listings in Middlesex County, Massachusetts
