= John Wade House =

Historic house in Massachusetts, United States

- U.S. National Register of Historic Places
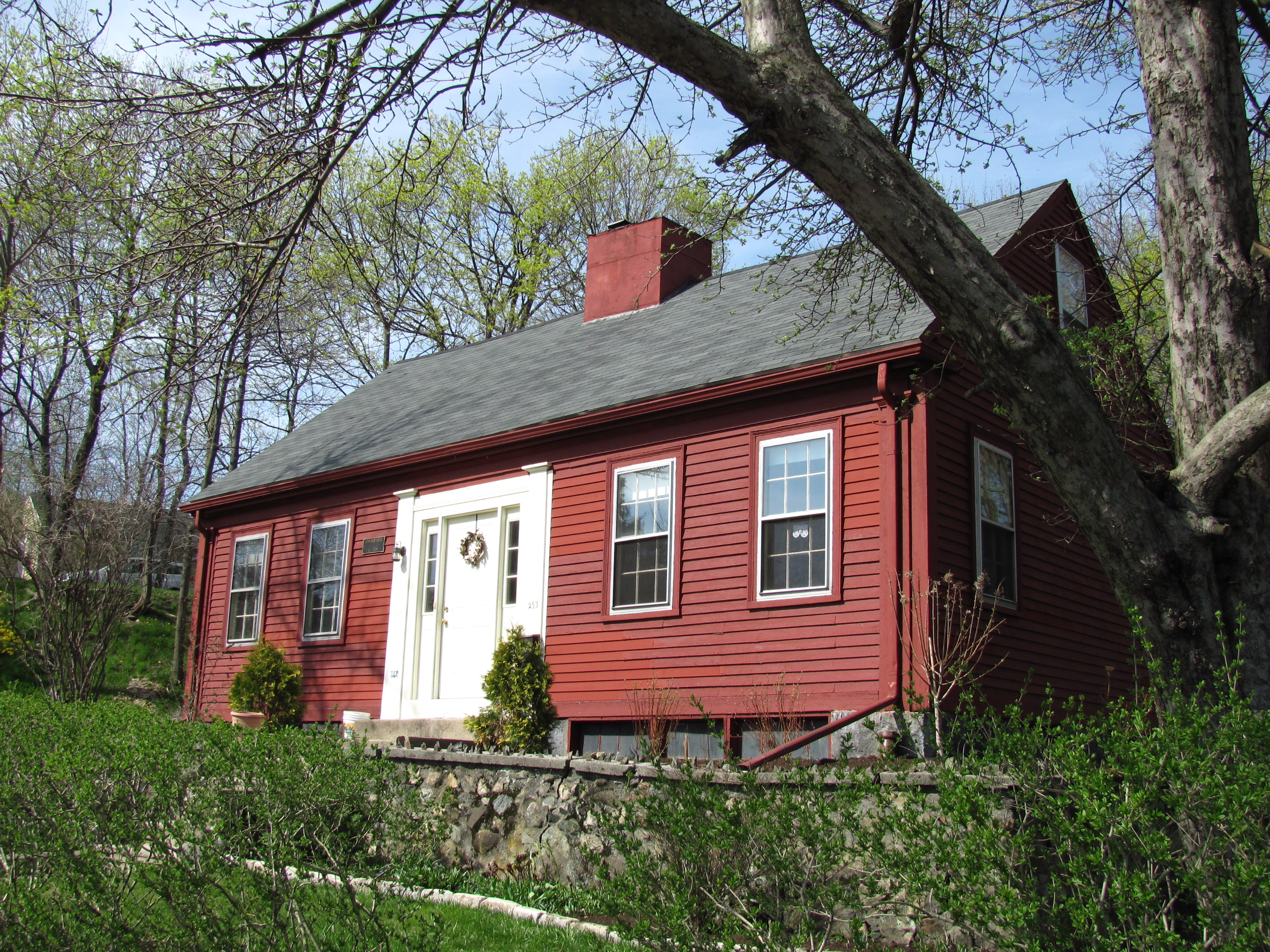

- Location within Massachusetts Location within the United States
- Location: 253 High Street, Medford, Massachusetts
- Coordinates: 42°25′15″N 71°7′18″W
- Built: c. 1784
- Architectural style: Greek Revival, Colonial
- NRHP reference No.: 75000282
- Added to NRHP: June 18, 1975

The John Wade House is a historic house located in Medford, Massachusetts. It is locally significant as one of only two surviving early Cape style houses in the city.

== Description and history ==
The 1 1/2-story, timber-framed house has a side gable roof, a large central chimney, and a solid granite foundation. The main facade is five bays wide, with a center entrance flanked by sidelight windows and pilasters. An ell and sunporch extend to the rear of the original main block. The house was built around 1784 by John Wade, a tanner. A later owner added the Greek Revival entrance surround

The house was listed on the National Register of Historic Places on June 18, 1975. It is sometimes referred to locally as the "Pierce Tavern", although it was never used as such, and probably stood next door to a tavern.

== See also ==
- National Register of Historic Places listings in Medford, Massachusetts
- National Register of Historic Places listings in Middlesex County, Massachusetts
