= Jonathan Brooks House =

Historic house in Massachusetts, United States

- U.S. National Register of Historic Places
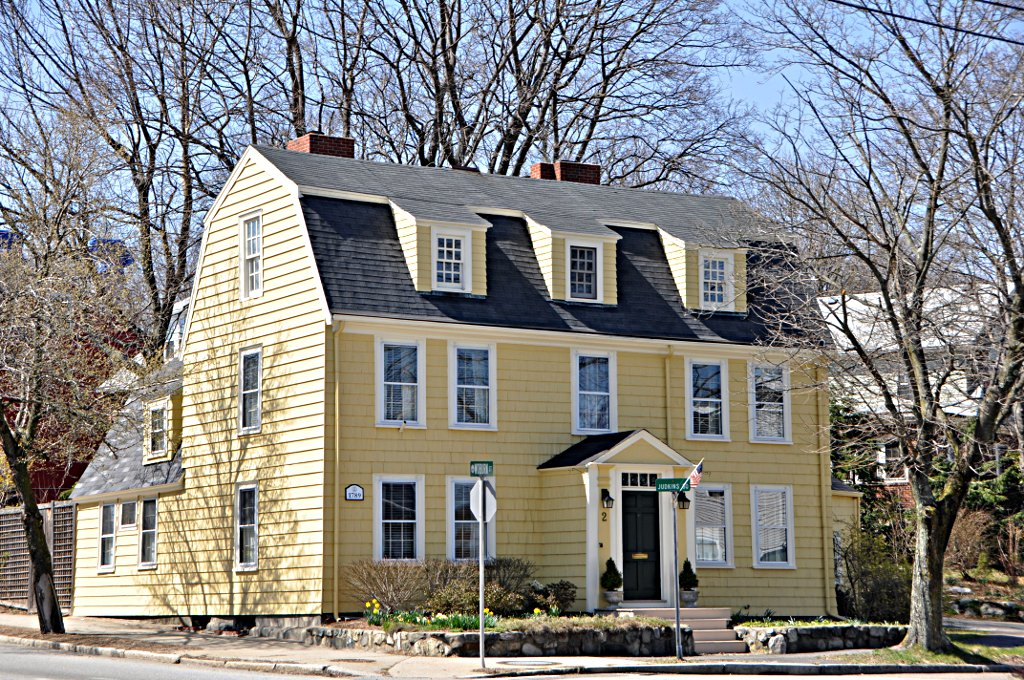

- Location within Massachusetts Location within the United States
- Location: Medford, Massachusetts, U.S.
- Coordinates: 42°25′18″N 71°7′26″W
- Built: 1781
- NRHP reference No.: 75000270
- Added to NRHP: June 26, 1975

The Jonathan Brooks House is a historic house at 2 Woburn Street in Medford, Massachusetts, United States. The house is estimated to have been built in the 1780s (the property is only described as including a house in 1791), although it may incorporate elements of an older structure. Jonathan Brooks, its owner in 1791, was a tanner and a member of the locally prominent Brooks family which owned much of West Medford at the time. The house is one of a small number of 18th century gambrel-roofed houses to survive in the city.

The house was listed on the National Register of Historic Places in 1975.

== See also ==
- National Register of Historic Places listings in Medford, Massachusetts
- National Register of Historic Places listings in Middlesex County, Massachusetts
