= Shepherd Brooks Estate =

Historic house in Massachusetts, United States

- U.S. National Register of Historic Places
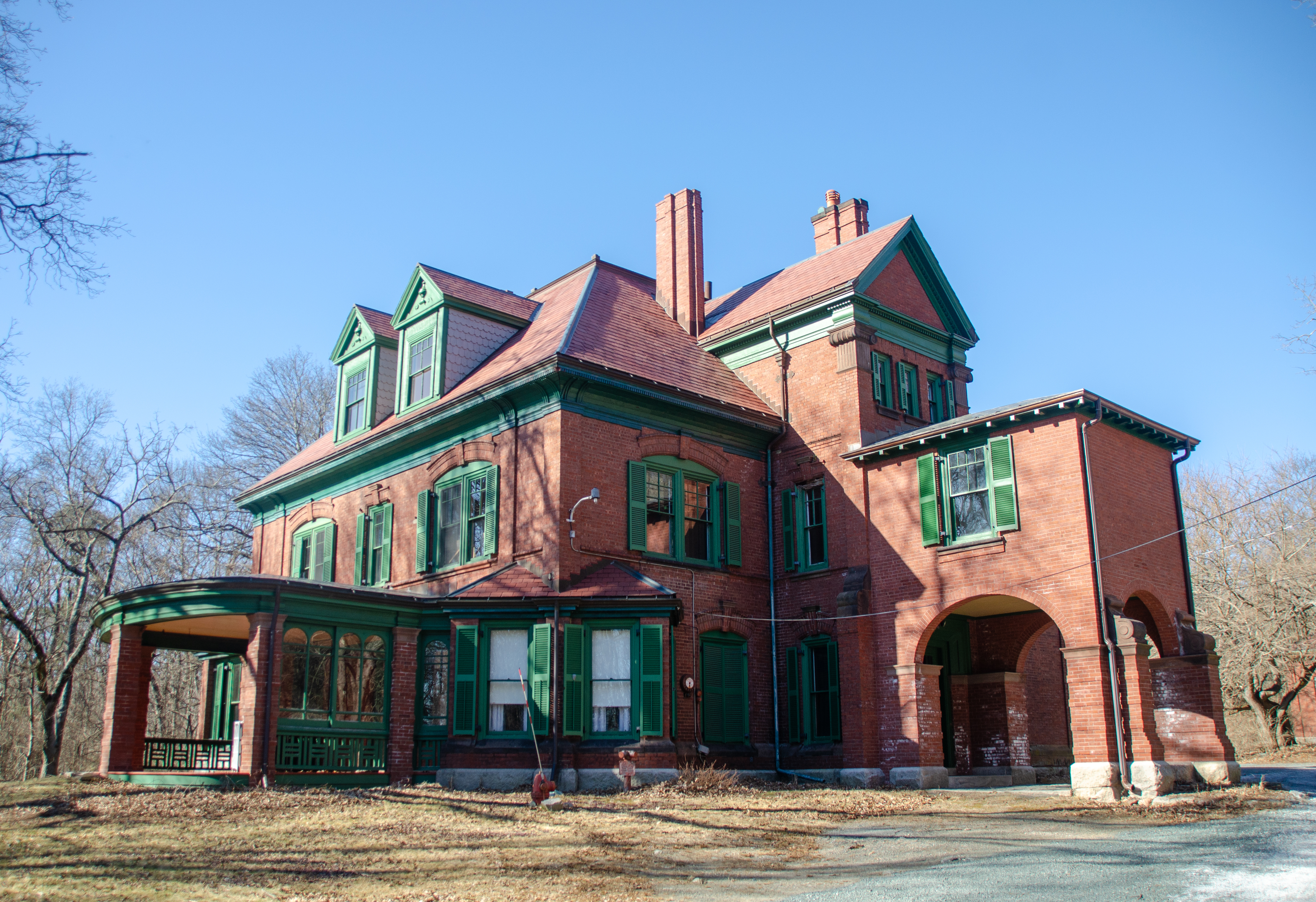
- The manor house on the estate (2024)

- Location within Massachusetts Location within the United States
- Location: 275 Grove Street; Medford, Massachusetts
- Coordinates: 42°26′0″N 71°8′22″W
- Built: 1881
- Built by: Norcross Brothers
- Architect: Peabody & Stearns
- Architectural style: Queen Anne
- NRHP reference No.: 75000271
- Added to NRHP: April 21, 1975

The Shepherd Brooks Estate is a historic property at 275 Grove Street in Medford, Massachusetts, United States. The 82-acre (33 ha) property is owned by the city of Medford, and managed by a trust established to preserve the property. Its principal feature is the manor house constructed in 1880 by Shepherd Brooks, a member of a prominent Medford family, and is the only major 19th-century estate to survive relatively undeveloped in the city. The grounds are open to the public daily from dawn to dusk, and tours of the house are available during the summer.

The estate was developed by Brooks, a member of the locally prominent Brooks family that dominated West Medford for many years, as a summer estate and gentleman's farm. The manor house was designed by Peabody and Stearns, and is a large red brick house, with Queen Anne styling. It has a complex roofline with many gables, and there is a porte-cochère. A carriage barn stands near the main house. The estate originally included a second summer house called Point of Rocks, built by Peter Chardon Brooks III in 1859, but this was demolished by the city in the 20th century. The city acquired the 82 acres (33 ha) remnant of the Brooks estate after the death of Shepherd Brooks' wife Clara in 1939. After the Second World War, the city used the estate to provide housing for veterans, and in the 1960s and 1970s it was used as a nursing home. From the 1970s through the late 1980s, the Manor building was used as a group home for mentally-challenged adults.

The proposal in 1992 to erect a cellphone tower near the Shepherd Brooks Manor was controversial among local residents. The Brooks Estate Preservation Association, a citizen-led group, was formed to challenge the City of Medford's leadership. A four-year effort to preserve the Brooks Estate in perpetuity was successfully completed with the passage of the Conservation and Preservation Restriction in 1998, which permanently protected the manor, carriage house and 50 acres (20 ha) of land from development and cemetery expansion. Local conservationists then worked to permanently protect the property.

The property was added to the National Register of Historic Places in 1975.

== Gallery ==
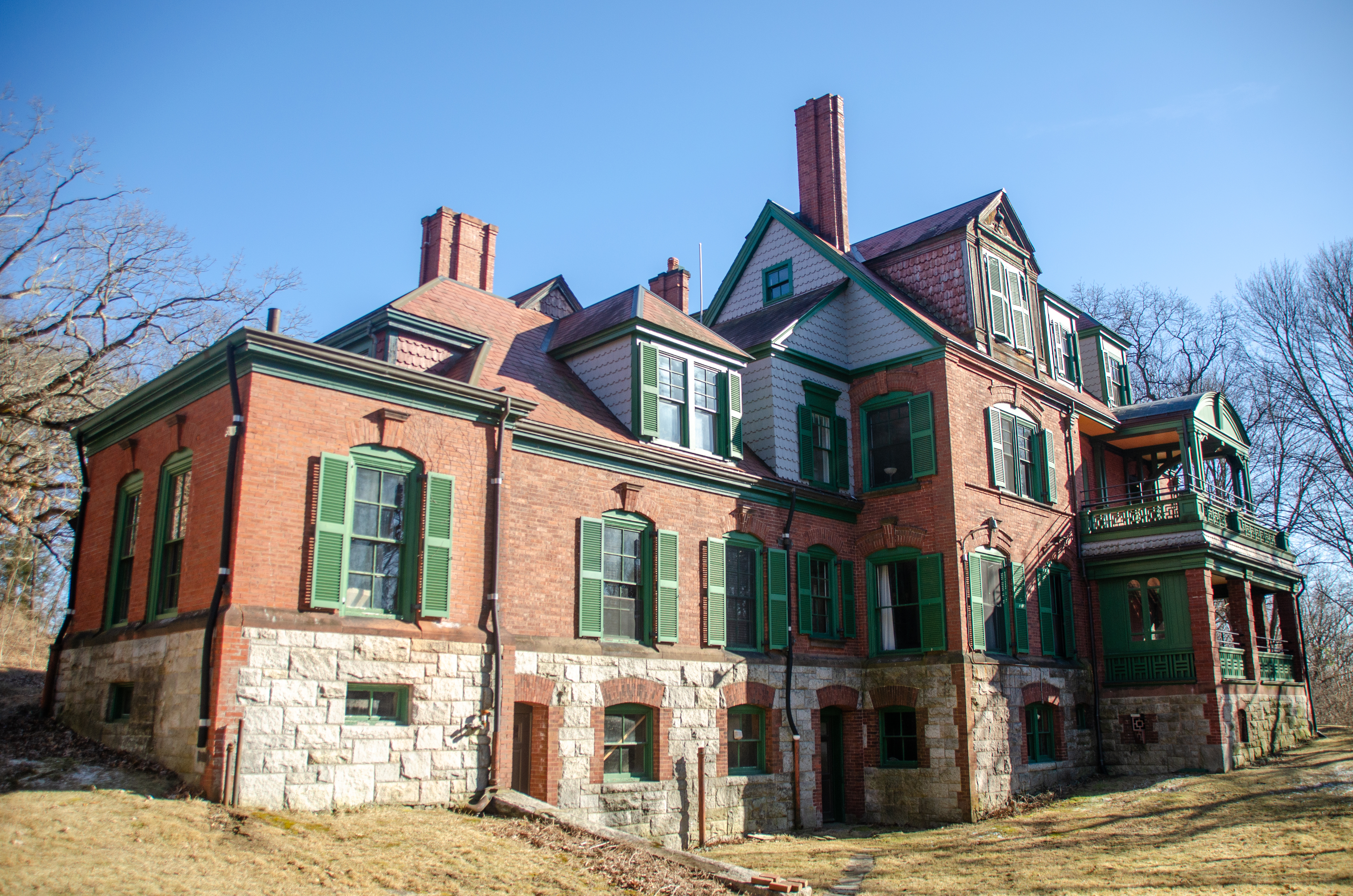
Main house view from northwest (2024)

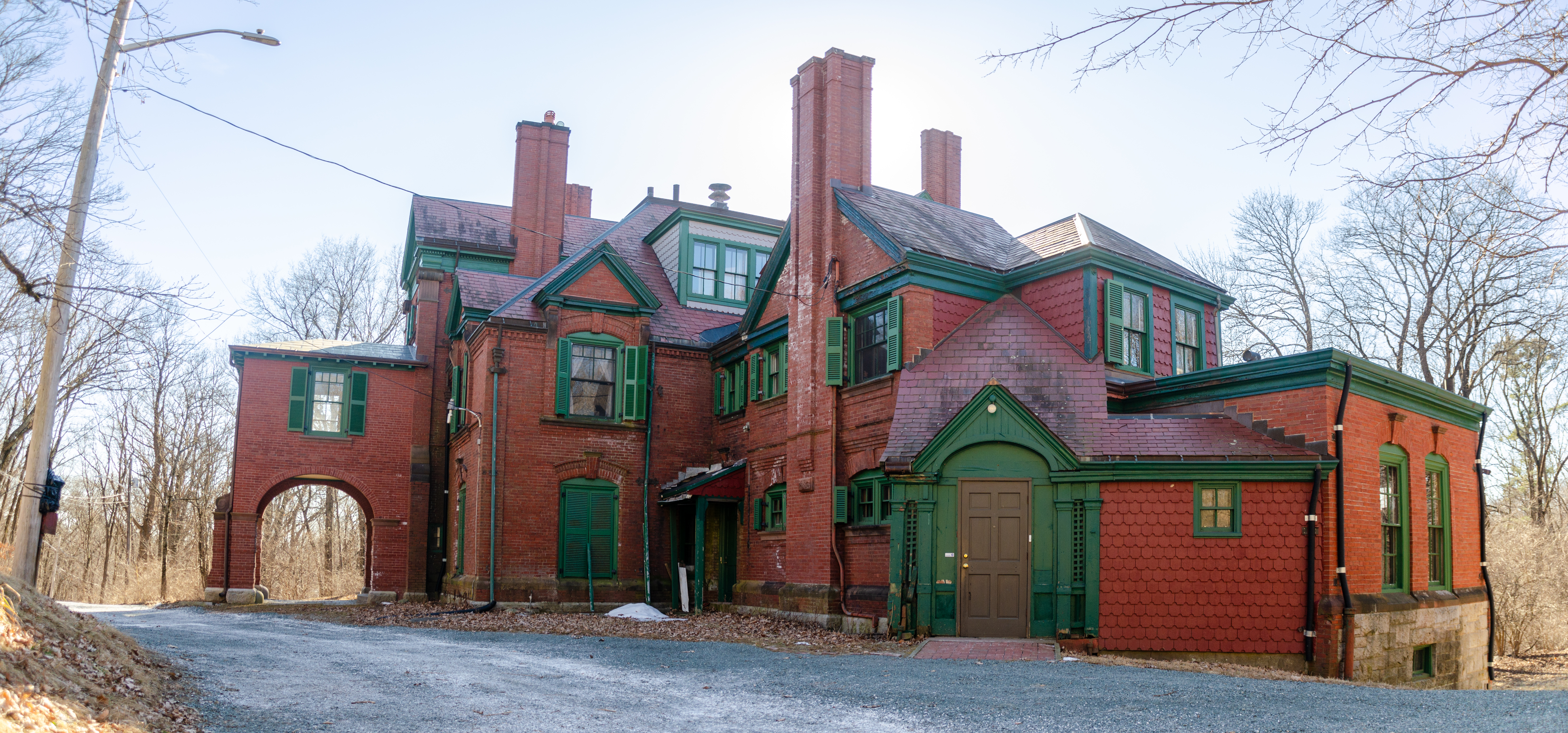
Main house view from northeast (2024)

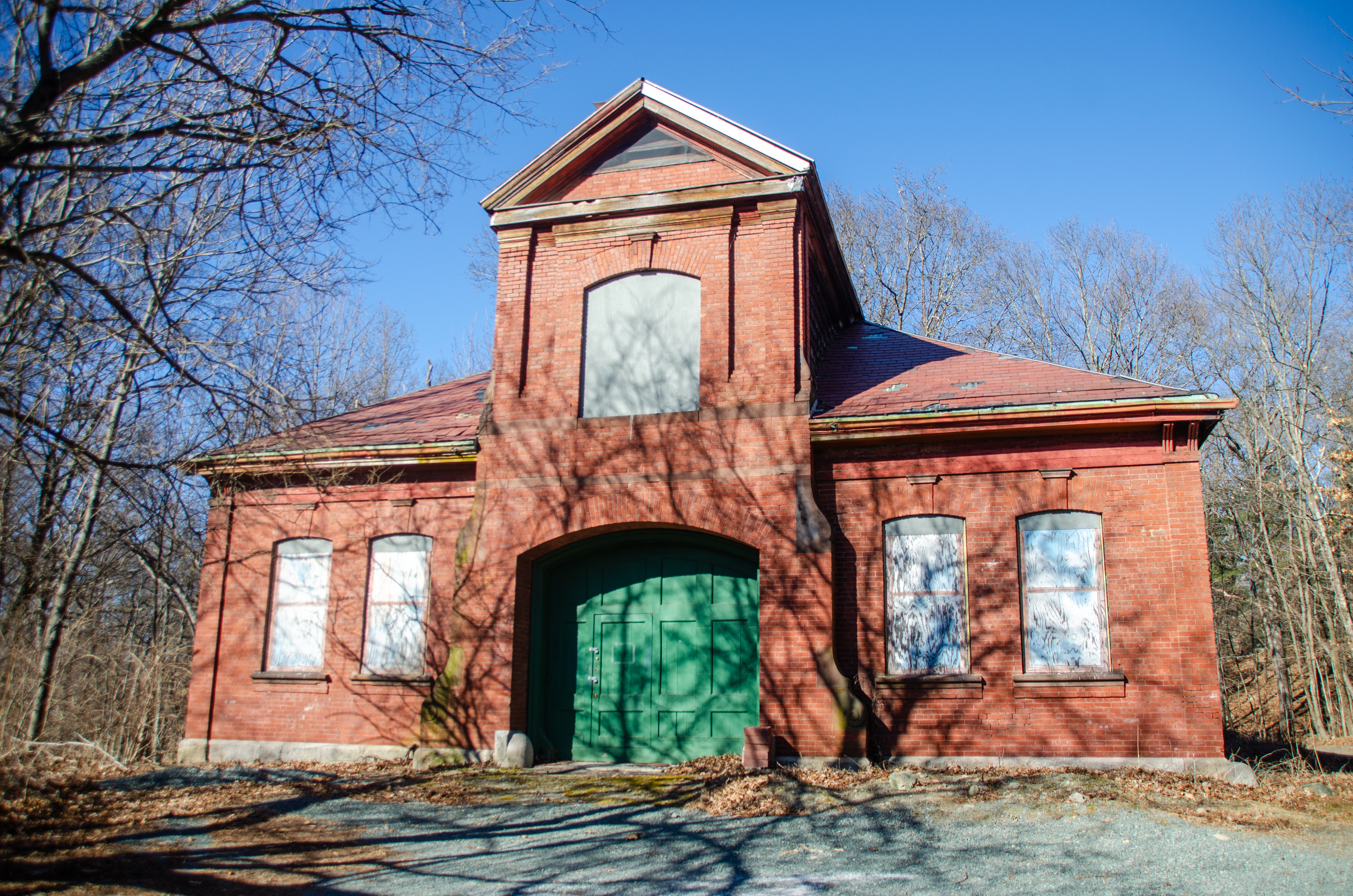
Carriage house (2024)

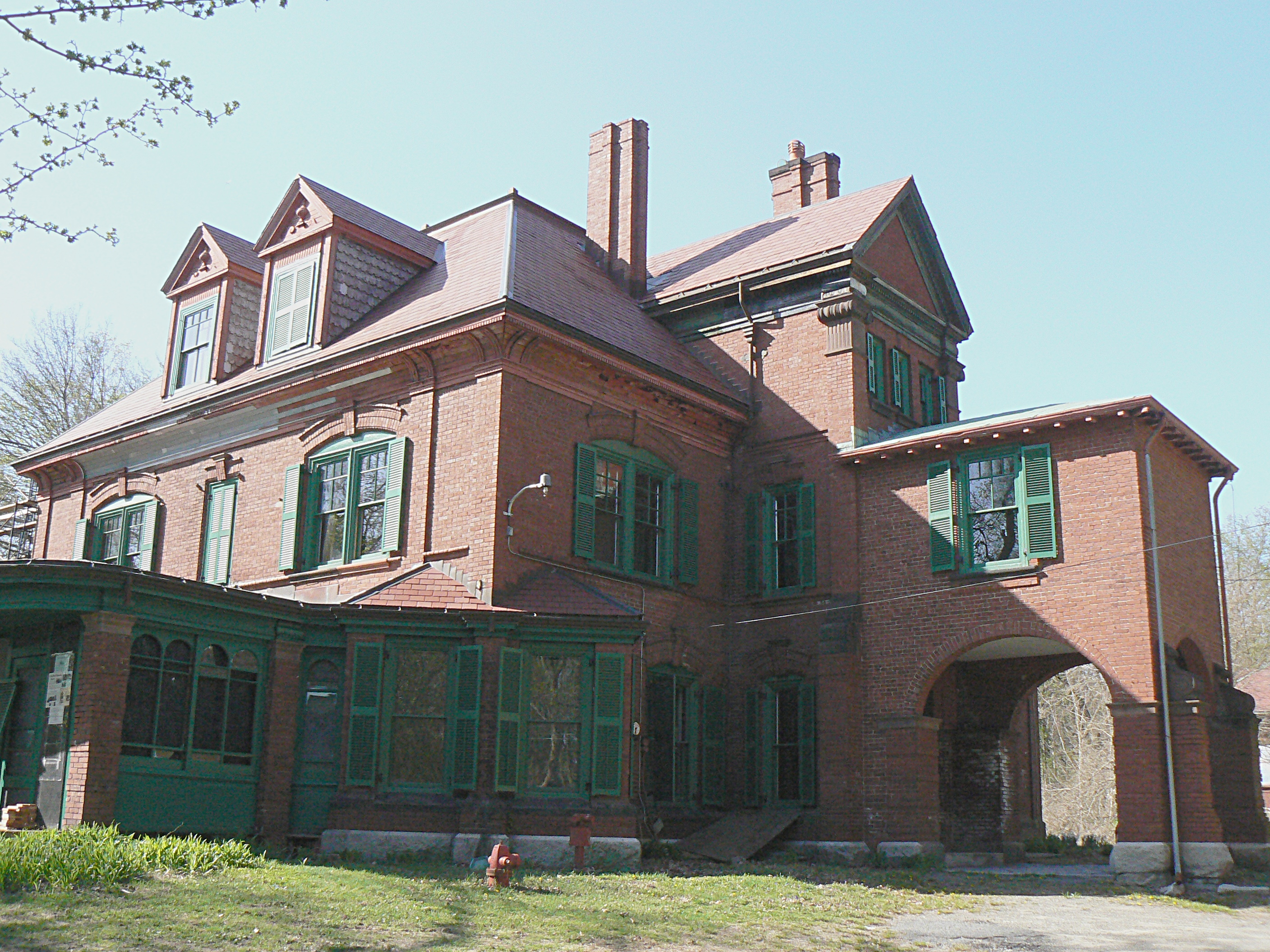
Main house (2010)

== See also ==
- National Register of Historic Places listings in Medford, Massachusetts
- National Register of Historic Places listings in Middlesex County, Massachusetts
