= John B. Angier House =

Historic house in Massachusetts, United States

- U.S. National Register of Historic Places
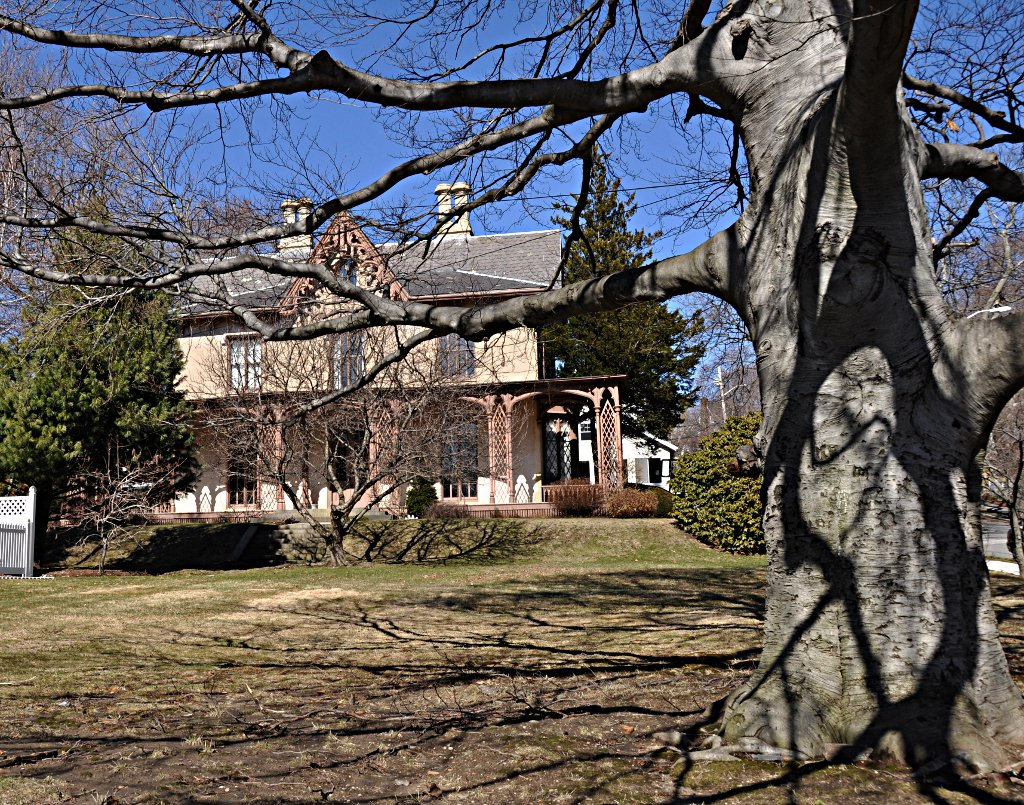

- Location within Massachusetts Location within the United States
- Location: 129 High Street, Medford, Massachusetts
- Coordinates: 42°25′12″N 71°6′54″W
- Built: 1842
- Architect: Davis, Alexander Jackson
- Architectural style: Gothic Revival
- NRHP reference No.: 75000267
- Added to NRHP: April 23, 1975

The John B. Angier House is a historic house located at 129 High Street in Medford, Massachusetts.

== Description and history ==
The 3 1/2-story timber-framed house was built in 1842 by Alexander Jackson Davis in a Gothic Revival style, and the property was originally landscaped by Andrew Downing. The owner, John B. Angier, was a prominent local schoolteacher whose pupils included Francis Parkman. The house is a rare Massachusetts example of Gothic Revival styling more commonly found along the Hudson River.

The house was listed on the National Register of Historic Places on April 23, 1975.

== See also ==
- National Register of Historic Places listings in Medford, Massachusetts
- National Register of Historic Places listings in Middlesex County, Massachusetts
