= Mystic Dam =

- U.S. National Register of Historic Places
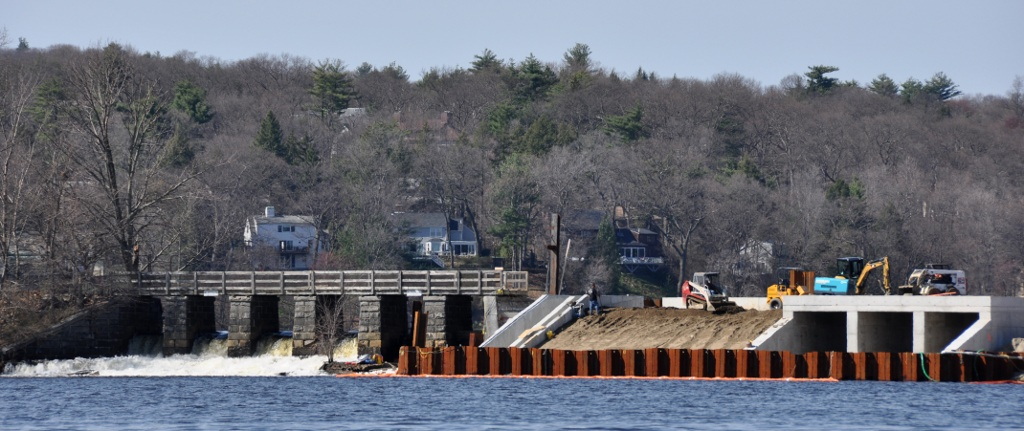
- The historic dam alongside modernizing construction in 2010

- Location within Massachusetts Location within the United States
- Location: Arlington / Medford, Massachusetts
- Coordinates: 42°25′50″N 71°8′56″W
- Built: 1864
- Architect: Barnes, Kingsley & Co.
- MPS: Water Supply System of Metropolitan Boston MPS
- NRHP reference No.: 89002282
- Added to NRHP: January 18, 1990

- Mystic Gatehouse
- U.S. National Register of Historic Places
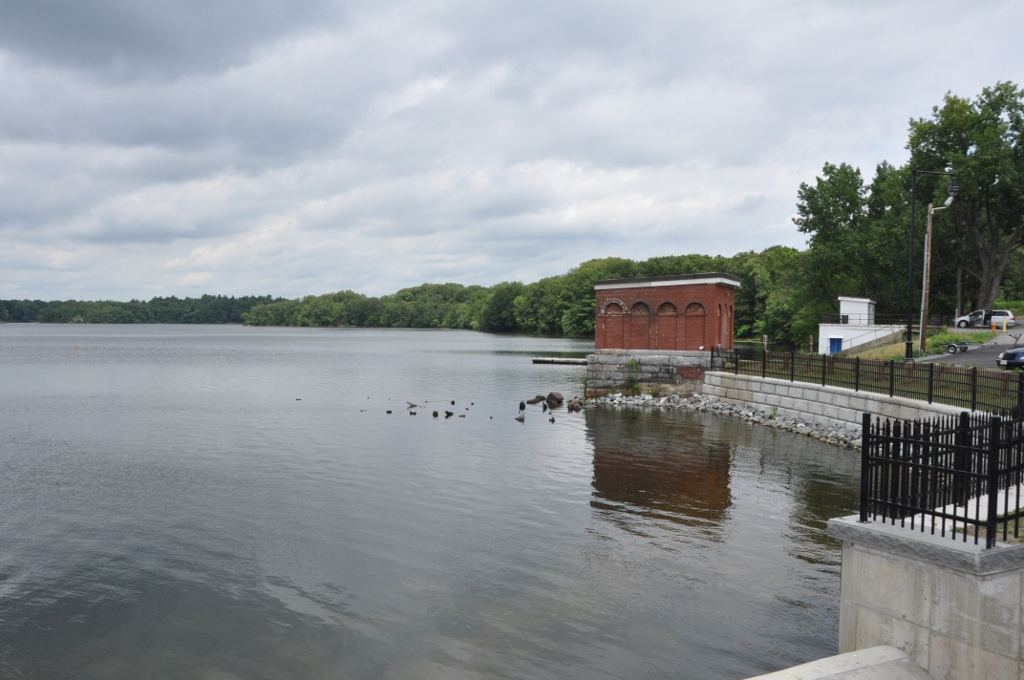
- View of the gatehouse and the Upper Mystic Lake
- Location: Medford, Massachusetts
- Built: 1862
- MPS: Water Supply System of Metropolitan Boston MPS
- NRHP reference No.: 89002284
- Added to NRHP: January 18, 1990

The Mystic Dam (and its gatehouse) are a historic dam and gatehouse between Lower and Upper Mystic Lakes in the suburbs north of Boston, Massachusetts. The dam was built in 1864–65 by the Charlestown Water Commission (Charlestown then being separate from Boston) as part of a water supply system. It was located at a narrow point between the Lower and Upper Mystic Lakes, with its west end in Arlington and its east end in Medford. The water system it was a part of eventually merged into the Metropolitan District Commission (MDC), predecessor to the Massachusetts Water Resources Authority (MWRA) and the Massachusetts Department of Conservation and Recreation (DCR).

As built, the dam was over 1,500 feet (460 m) long and 16 feet (4.9 m) high, with most of that length (about 1,000 feet (300 m)) consisting of earthen embankments lined with riprap and puddle clay. Near its center is a spillway area consisting of a series of square columns constructed of granite blocks and a masonry apron. These columns are grooved on their inner faces to facilitate the installation of stop logs. A wooden walkway with a plank railing ran across the top of the dam. A wooden fish ladder was built, but removed at a later date. A gatehouse on the Medford side was used to connect the upper lake to a brick-lined aqueduct that delivered the water to Charlestown. The lake area impounded by the dam is 186 acres (75 ha).

The dam and gatehouse were each listed on the National Register of Historic Places in 1990. By the early 2000s, the dam was known to not be in very good condition, with failing spillway masonry, erosion, and other damage to the dam's stonework. A major storm in 2006 flooded portions of the surrounding area, and highlighted the potential inability of the dam to handle a significant high-water event, leading to catastrophic flooding of downstream areas. Between 2010 and 2012 major work was undertaken to improve the dam's condition. A new spillway was constructed to the east of the old spillway, which received a new spillway apron. Work was done on the embankments and the shores near the upper areas of the dam, and a new fish ladder and bridge were built. The historic gatehouse was also rehabilitated, and modern controls were added, enabling improved control over the water levels behind the dam.

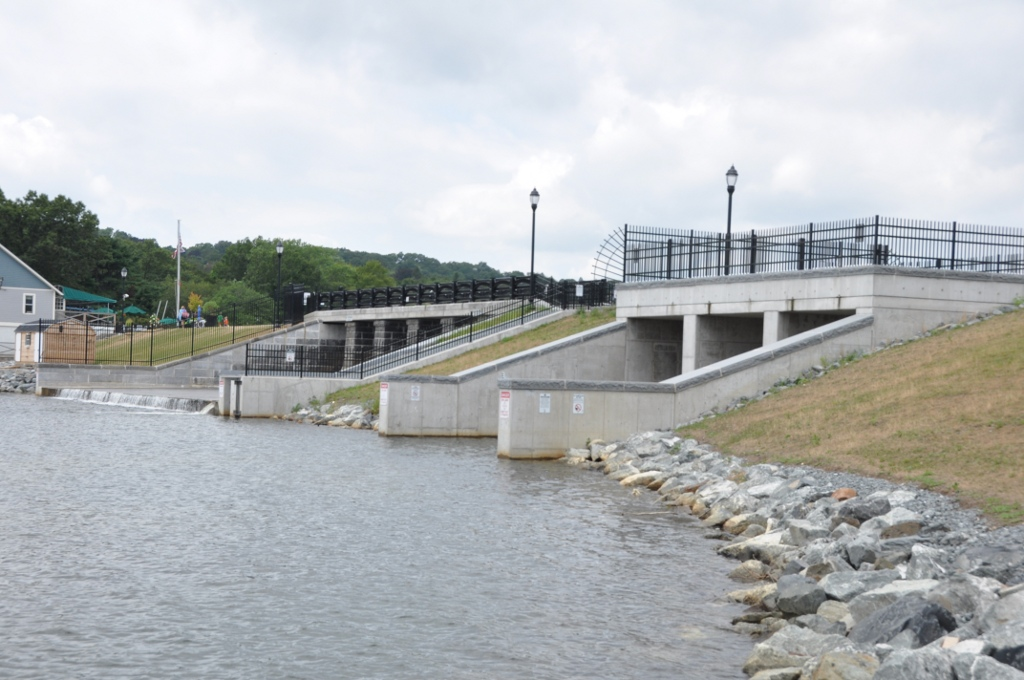
After the 2010 renovations.

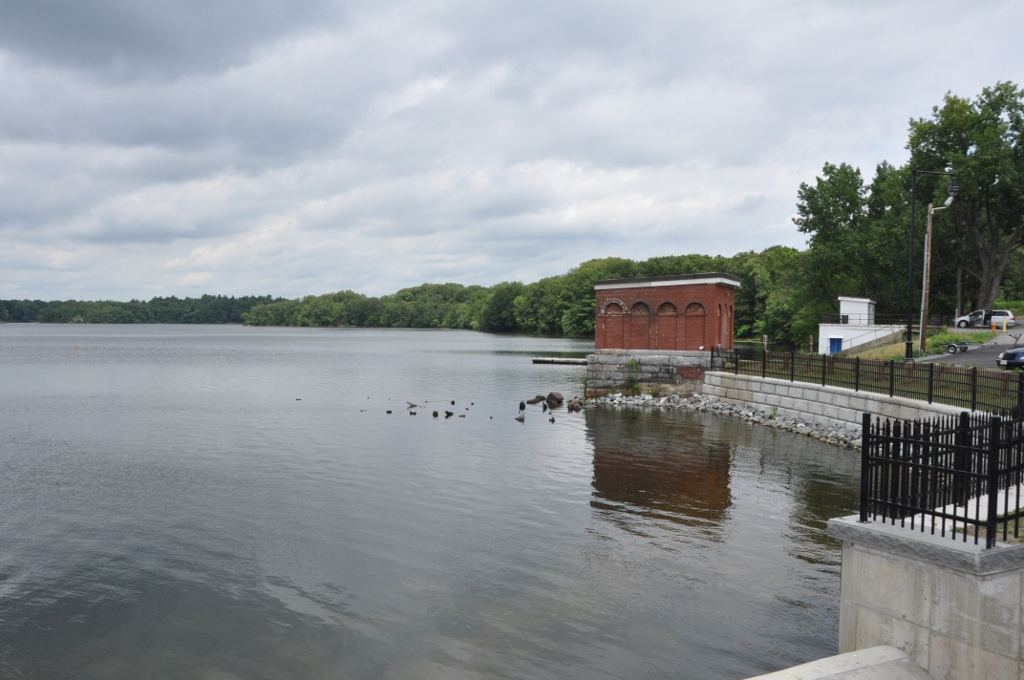
The gatehouse.

== See also ==
- Mystic Water Works, a period pumping station in Somerville
- National Register of Historic Places listings in Arlington, Massachusetts
- National Register of Historic Places listings in Medford, Massachusetts
