= Park Street station (Boston and Maine Railroad) =

Former railroad station in Medford, Massachusetts

Park Street
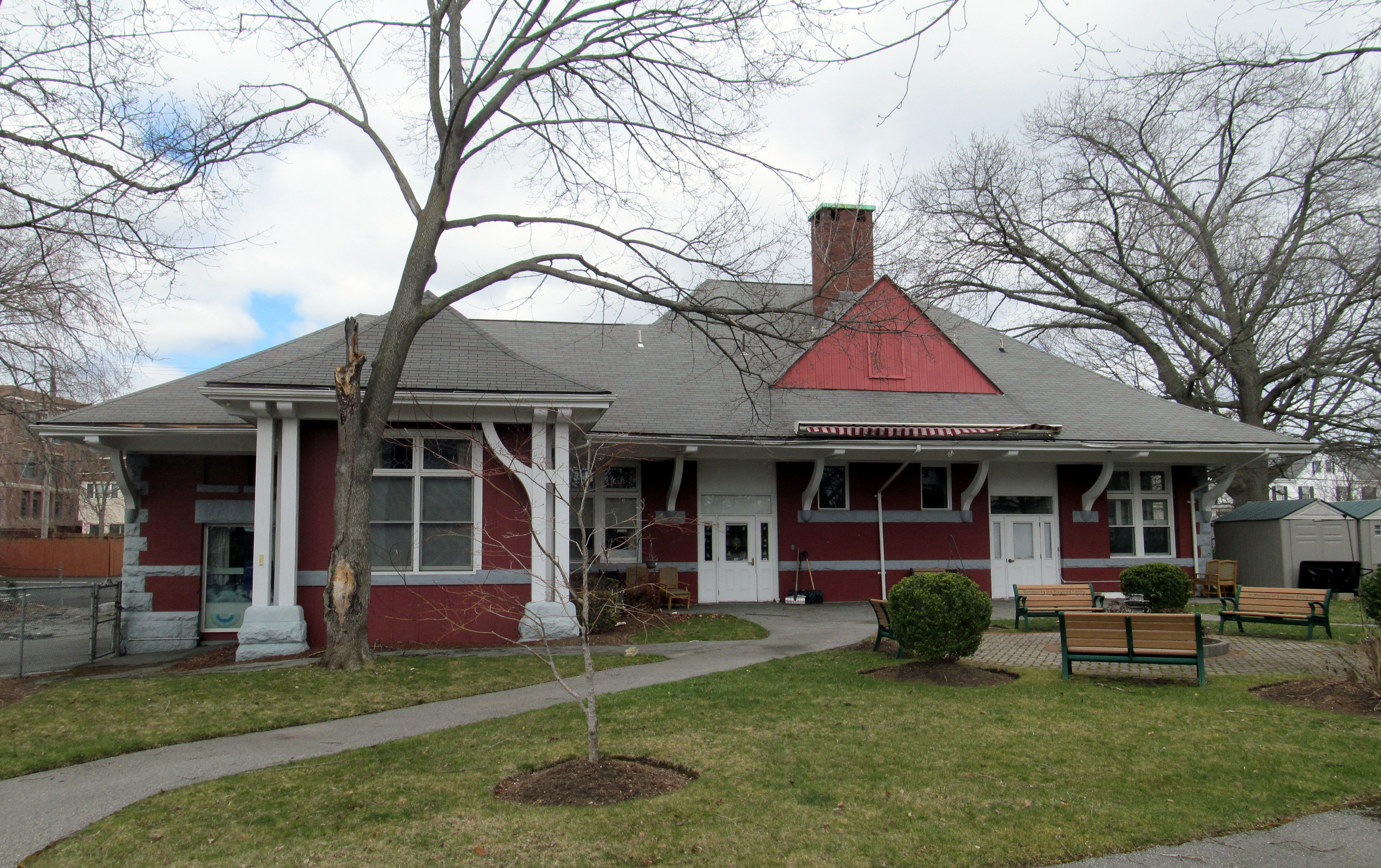
- The former Park Street station in April 2017

General information
- Location: 121 Washington Street; Medford, Massachusetts
- Line: Medford branch

History
- Opened: c. 1880s
- Closed: October 1, 1957

Former services
Preceding station	Boston and Maine Railroad	Following station
Medford Terminus	Medford Branch	Glenwood toward Boston
- Park Street Railroad Station
- U.S. National Register of Historic Places
- Coordinates: 42°24′59″N 71°5′55″W
- Built: 1894
- Architect: Clarence B. Cutler
- NRHP reference No.: 75000280
- Added to NRHP: April 21, 1975
Location

Park Street station is a former railroad station in Medford, Massachusetts. Constructed by the Boston and Maine Railroad in 1894, the building was abandoned in the 1930s, although passenger service continued to stop until 1957. The structure was added to the National Register of Historic Places in 1975 as Park Street Railroad Station. It is the only extant railroad station building in Medford.

== History ==
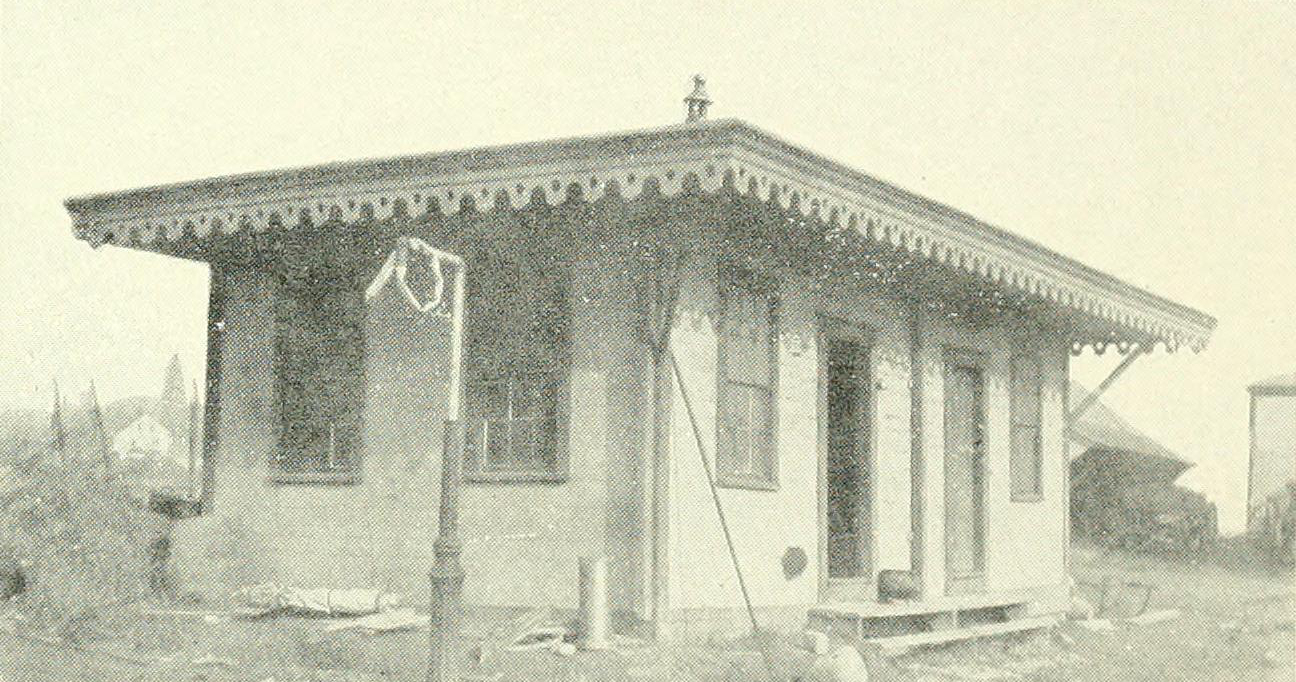
The original Park Street station

The Medford branch was built by the Boston and Maine Railroad (B&M) in 1847. A station at Park Street was not added until between 1875 and 1889. The first station was a wooden structure with a gable roof, located on the north side of the tracks just east of Park Street. In the 1890s, the B&M double-tracked the branch to provide more frequent service to compete with electric streetcars. B&M vice president Samuel C. Lawrence became the first mayor of Medford in 1893, partially on promises to provide new station buildings at Park Street and Glenwood.

Construction of the new Park Street station began in mid-1893. Because land was difficult to obtain, the B&M originally considered building the station over the tracks. It was designed by Clarence B. Cutler and was completed in 1894. It was unusually large and well-appointed for a branch line station due to the influence of Lawrence; he had his personal gardeners attend to the station grounds. The station is a one-story rectangular structure built of red brick with granite base and trim. A hip roof and porte-cochère are supported by posts with large curved brackets. The station was located on the south side of the tracks slightly east of the former station; a footbridge was constructed at the station. Reports vary as to whether the original station was demolished, or was moved and reused by the city highway department.

Despite the new stations and frequent service, the branch lost most of its ridership to the streetcars and later automobiles. Service was discontinued for a period around 1933-34, and the station building remained in disuse even after service resumed. The abandoned building was given to the city in 1942 to reduce the B&M tax bill. Passenger service on the Medford branch, including the stop at the abandoned Park Street building, continued until on October 1, 1957. The tracks were abandoned west of Park Street in 1959, and east to Glenwood in 1961.

The former station was added to the National Register of Historic Places in 1975 as Park Street Railroad Station. It has been reused as an adult day care center.

== See also ==
- National Register of Historic Places listings in Medford, Massachusetts
