= United States Post Office–Medford Main =

- US Post Office–Medford Main
- U.S. National Register of Historic Places
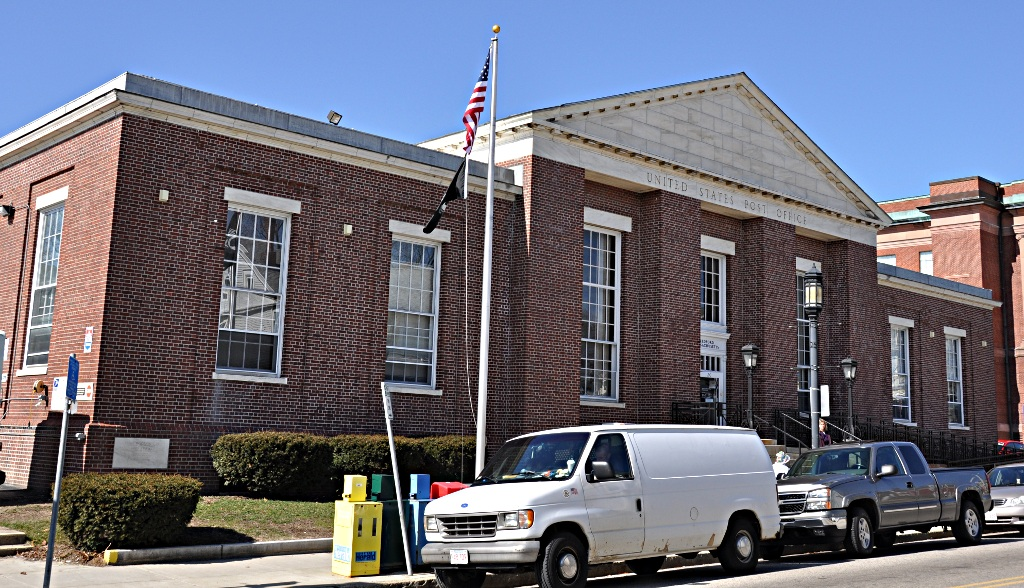

- Location within Massachusetts Location within the United States
- Location: Medford, Massachusetts
- Coordinates: 42°25′8″N 71°6′36″W
- Built: 1937
- Architect: Louis A. Simon
- NRHP reference No.: 86001346
- Added to NRHP: June 18, 1986

The US Post Office–Medford Main is a historic post office at 20 Forest Street in Medford, Massachusetts. Built in 1937, it is a fine example of construction work funded by the Public Works Administration, a jobs program of the 1930s. It was listed on the National Register of Historic Places in 1986.

== Description and history ==
The main Medford Post Office is set on the west side of Forest Street, just north of the central business district's main intersection. The front portion of the building is a seven-bay brick structure, set on a high foundation. The central three bays project forward and upward, and are topped by a gabled roof with a modillioned marble pediment. The outer bays of the projection house tall windows, and the center one the entrance, which is reached via granite steps. The windows in the outer bays are set in recessed panels, with marble sills and lintels. The interior lobby space features terrazzo marble flooring, marble wainscoting, and dark woodwork. The service area, located to the right is topped by a mural depicting the city's historic shipbuilding and rum industries.

The building's principal designing architect was Arthur Blakeslee, and it was built in 1937 with funding from the Public Works Administration (PWA), following that body's guidelines for design and construction. The building's location on a side street (as opposed to a more prominent corner or main street location) was an evolutionary step in the PWA's practices for post office location, allowing the mail handling area to be accessed from the side rather than the rear.

== See also ==
- National Register of Historic Places listings in Medford, Massachusetts
- National Register of Historic Places listings in Middlesex County, Massachusetts
- List of United States post offices
