= Charles Brooks House =

Historic house in Massachusetts, United States

- U.S. National Register of Historic Places
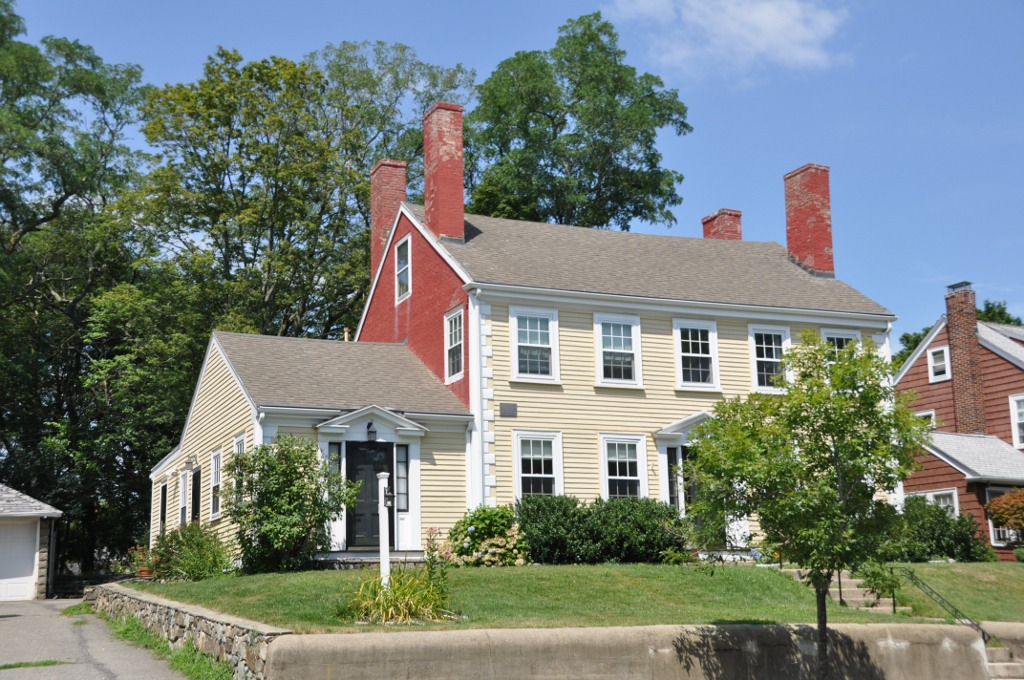

- Location within Massachusetts Location within the United States
- Location: Medford, Massachusetts
- Coordinates: 42°25′18″N 71°7′28″W
- Built: 1765
- NRHP reference No.: 75000269
- Added to NRHP: June 18, 1975

The Charles Brooks House is a historic house at 309 High Street in Medford, Massachusetts. It is a 2 1/2-story wood-frame house with brick side walls, each of which has two chimneys built into it. The house is estimated to have been built around 1765, early in the Federal period. It has exterior details that are now rare in Medford, including corner quoining and cornice detailing. The house is most notable, however, for its association with Rev. Charles Brooks, a prominent figure in local history.

Brooks (1795-1872) played an active role in the development of the educational systems of Massachusetts, including its normal schools. He also cowrote an early history of the city.

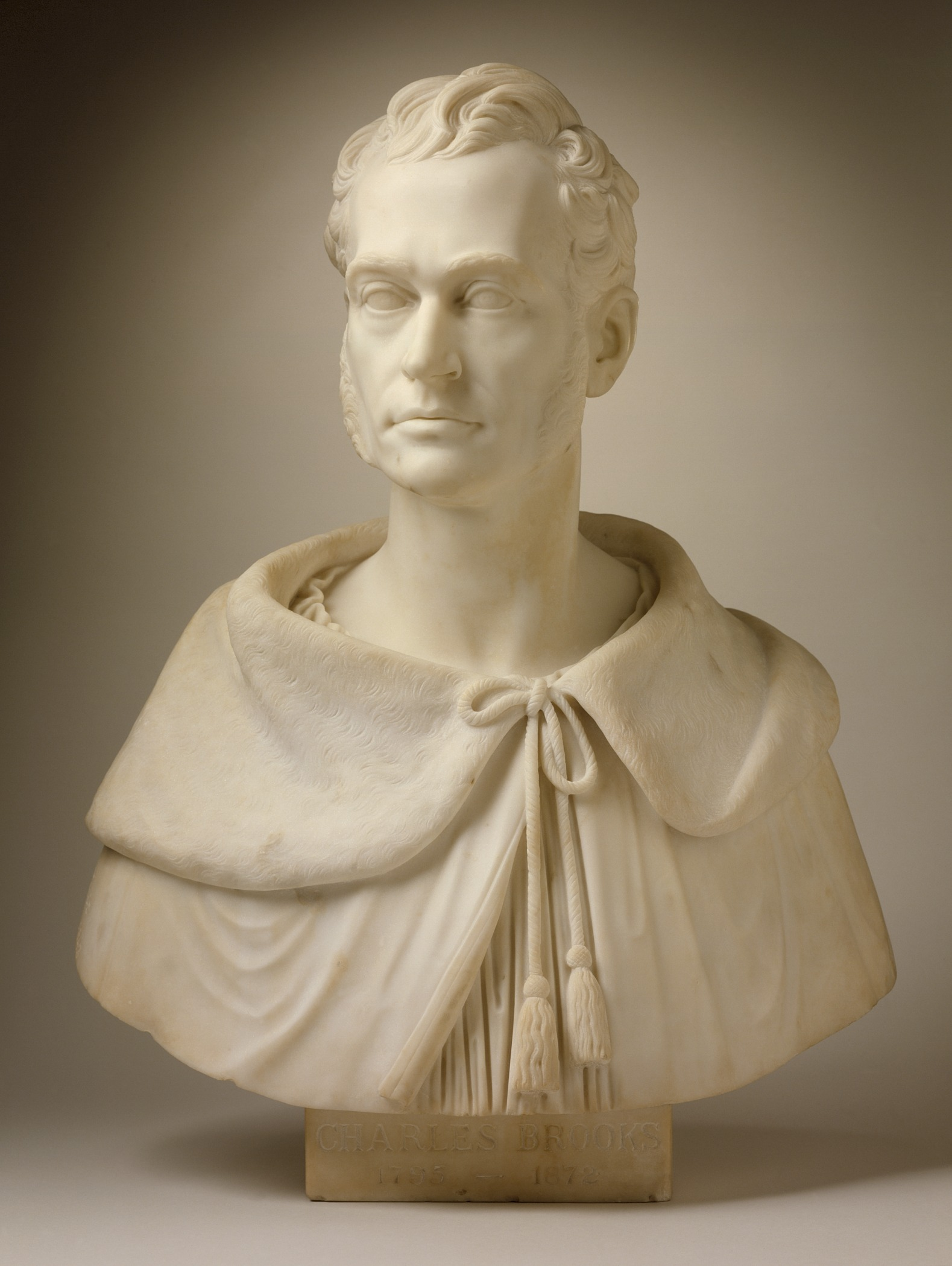
Bust of Charles Brooks

The house was listed on the National Register of Historic Places in 1975.

== See also ==
- National Register of Historic Places listings in Medford, Massachusetts
- National Register of Historic Places listings in Middlesex County, Massachusetts
