= Richard Pinkham House =

Historic house in Massachusetts, United States

- U.S. National Register of Historic Places
- U.S. Historic district – Contributing property
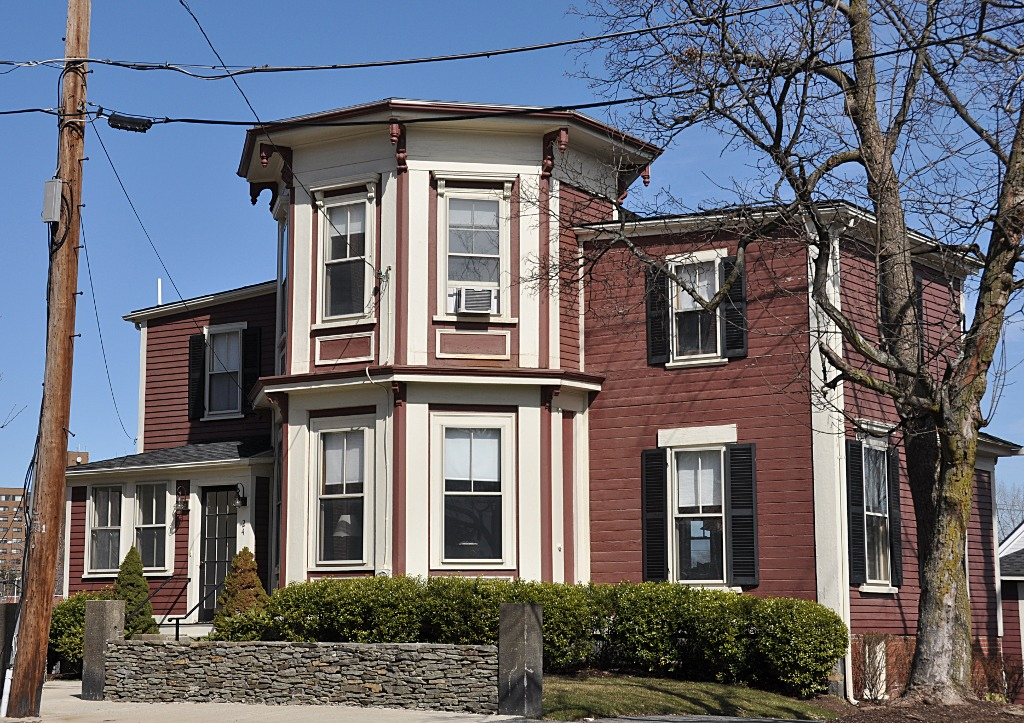

- Location within Massachusetts Location within the United States
- Location: Medford, Massachusetts
- Coordinates: 42°24′43″N 71°6′35″W
- Built: 1850
- Architect: Pinkham, Richard G.
- Architectural style: Mid 19th Century Revival, Italianate
- Part of: Middlesex Canal Historic and Archeological District (ID09000936)
- NRHP reference No.: 07001399

Significant dates
- Added to NRHP: January 16, 2008
- Designated CP: November 19, 2009

The Richard Pinkham House is a historic house at 24 Brooks Park in Medford, Massachusetts. The unusually shaped Italianate wood-frame house was built c. 1850 by Richard Pinkham, a housewright who then lived in the property. The house is unique in Medford in the presence of a 2 1/2-story octagon section, which rises above the rest of the roughly cruciform house. It was built on a portion of the route of the Middlesex Canal, portions of which were at that time being sold off by its owners.

The house was listed on the National Register of Historic Places in 2008, and included as part of the Middlesex Canal Historic and Archeological District in 2009.

== See also ==
- National Register of Historic Places listings in Medford, Massachusetts
- National Register of Historic Places listings in Middlesex County, Massachusetts
