= Lawrence Light Guard Armory =

- U.S. National Register of Historic Places
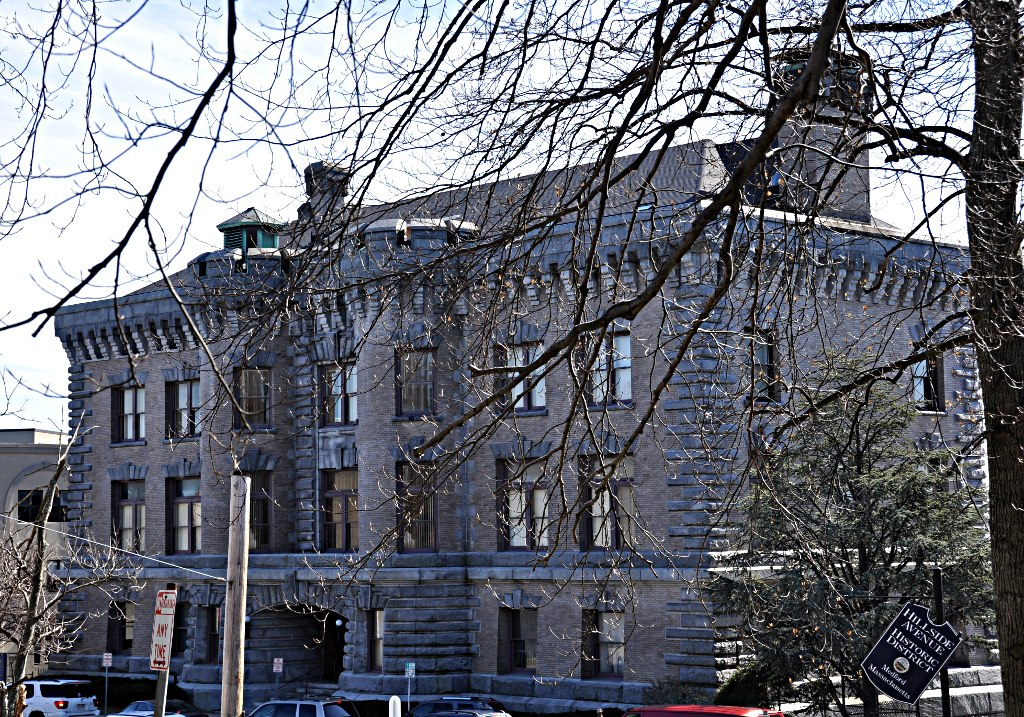

- Location within Massachusetts Location within the United States
- Location: Medford, Massachusetts
- Coordinates: 42°25′7″N 71°6′47″W
- Built: 1900
- Architect: Shepley, Rutan & Coolidge
- Architectural style: Romanesque
- NRHP reference No.: 75000277
- Added to NRHP: March 10, 1975

The Lawrence Light Guard Armory is a historic armory building at 92 High Street in Medford, Massachusetts. The three-story granite and brick building was built in 1891 to a design by Shepley, Rutan and Coolidge. The Romanesque Revival building has massive granite quoins on the corners, a granite course between the first and second floors, and granite lintel sections above its windows. The entrance, centered on the north facade, is flanked by round turrets with crenellated tops.

The building was listed on the National Register of Historic Places in 1975.

== See also ==
- National Register of Historic Places listings in Medford, Massachusetts
- National Register of Historic Places listings in Middlesex County, Massachusetts
- List of military installations in Massachusetts
