= Albree-Hall-Lawrence House =

Historic house in Massachusetts, United States

- U.S. National Register of Historic Places
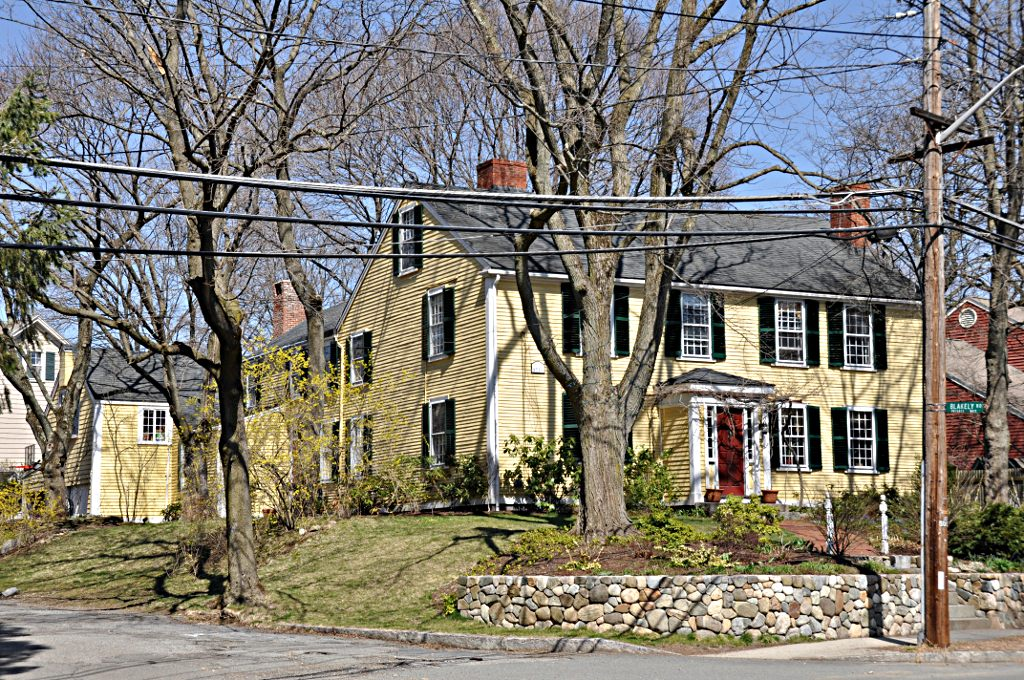

- Location within Massachusetts Location within the United States
- Location: 353 Lawrence Road, Medford, Massachusetts
- Coordinates: 42°25′29″N 71°7′12″W
- Built: 1835
- NRHP reference No.: 76000256
- Added to NRHP: April 30, 1976

The Albree-Hall-Lawrence House is a historic house located at 353 Lawrence Road in Medford, Massachusetts.

== Description and history ==
The 2.5-story wood-frame house has a somewhat complex construction history, which may date to the early years of the 18th century. Its foundations give evidence of at least three periods of construction prior to 1850, and it is known that a house was standing at this one's approximate site in 1720, when John Albree purchased the farm and house. In the early decades of the 19th century the house was owned by Peter Chardon Brooks, who gave it his sister and son-in-law, Joanna Brooks Hall and Nathaniel Hall. During the 1830s, Francis Parkman, then a child, lived in this house for several years. The farm was later purchased by Samuel C. Lawrence, the first mayor of Medford, and incorporated into his estate.

The house was listed on the National Register of Historic Places on April 30, 1976.

== See also ==
- National Register of Historic Places listings in Medford, Massachusetts
- National Register of Historic Places listings in Middlesex County, Massachusetts
