= Edward Oakes House =

Historic house in Massachusetts, United States

- U.S. National Register of Historic Places
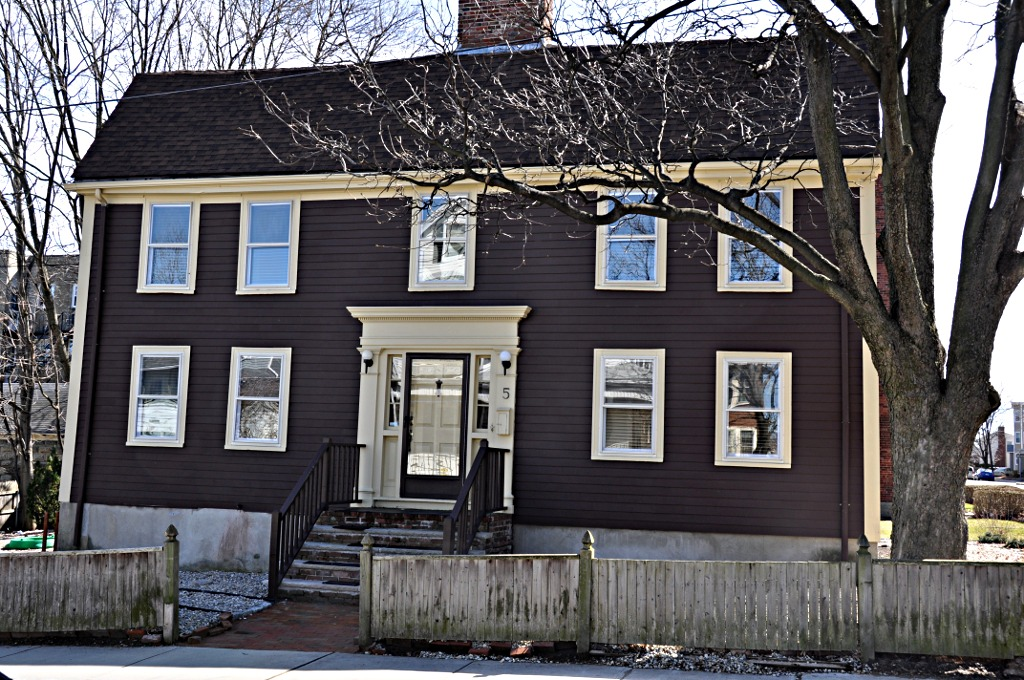

- Location within Massachusetts Location within the United States
- Location: Medford, Massachusetts
- Coordinates: 42°24′43″N 71°6′39″W
- Built: 1728
- NRHP reference No.: 80000639
- Added to NRHP: April 9, 1980

The Edward Oakes House is a historic house at 5 Sylvia Road in Medford, Massachusetts. It is a 2 1/2-story timber-frame house, five bays wide, with a gambrel roof, wood shingle siding, and a brick foundation. A rear leanto section gives the house a saltbox appearance. The main entrance is flanked by sidelight windows. It was built c. 1728, probably by Edward Oakes. It is one of the oldest surviving wood-frame houses in Medford, and is unusual for the period due to its gambrel roof.

The house was listed on the National Register of Historic Places in 1980.

== See also ==
- National Register of Historic Places listings in Medford, Massachusetts
- National Register of Historic Places listings in Middlesex County, Massachusetts
