= George P. Fernald House =

Historic house in Massachusetts, United States

- U.S. National Register of Historic Places
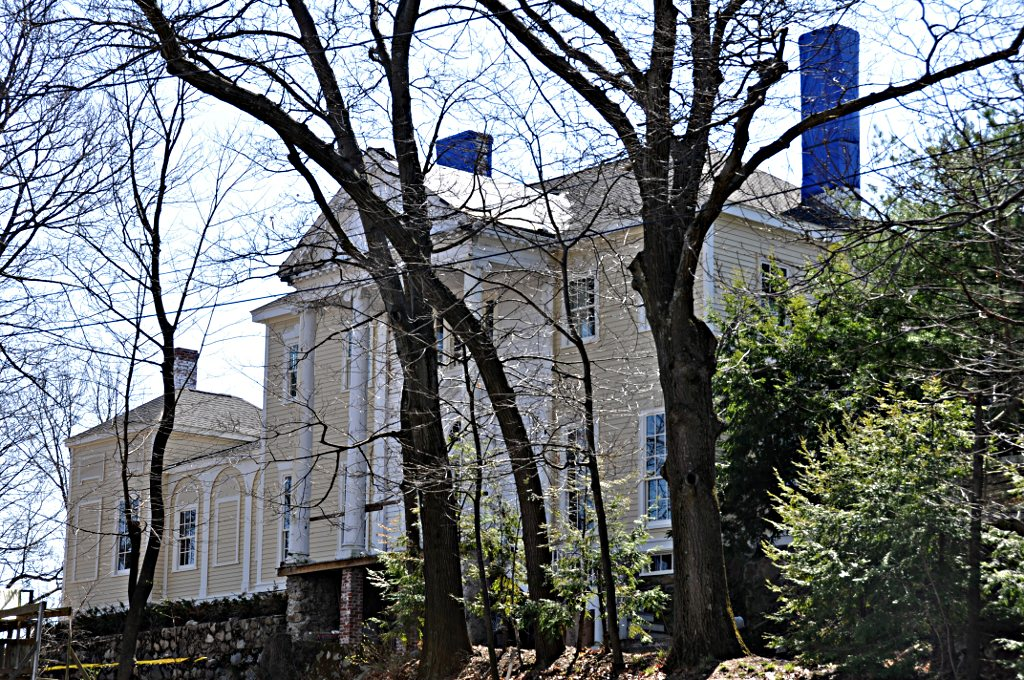

- Location within Massachusetts Location within the United States
- Location: Medford, Massachusetts
- Coordinates: 42°25′14″N 71°7′23″W
- Built: 1894
- Architect: Fernald, George Porter; Lovering, Lewis H.
- Architectural style: Colonial Revival
- NRHP reference No.: 76000258
- Added to NRHP: April 30, 1976

The George P. Fernald House is a historic house at 12 Rock Hill Street in Medford, Massachusetts. The Colonial Revival mansion was built c. 1895 for George P. Fernald, an architect and leading exponent of the Colonial Revival style. The house was probably designed by Fernald, possibly with the assistance of his brother Albert, who was also an architect. The house has a two-story Ionic pedimented portico that shelters an elaborate Federal-style entry, supposedly influenced by Fernald's work making drawings of the Count Rumford Birthplace in Woburn, Massachusetts.

The house was listed on the National Register of Historic Places in 1976.

== See also ==
- National Register of Historic Places listings in Medford, Massachusetts
- National Register of Historic Places listings in Middlesex County, Massachusetts
