= National Register of Historic Places listings in Medford, Massachusetts =

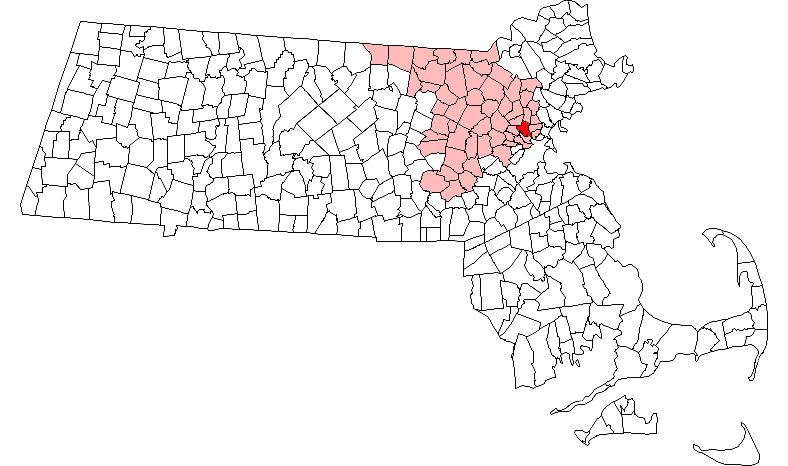
Location of Medford in Massachusetts

This is a list of places and properties listed on the National Register of Historic Places in Medford, Massachusetts.

This National Park Service list is complete through NPS recent listings posted August 21, 2026.

== Current listings ==
	Name on the Register	Image	Date listed	Location	City or town	Description
1	Albree-Hall-Lawrence House	Albree-Hall-Lawrence House	April 30, 1976 (#76000256)	353 Lawrence Rd. 42°25′29″N 71°07′12″W		
2	John B. Angier House	John B. Angier House	April 23, 1975 (#75000267)	129 High St. 42°25′12″N 71°06′54″W		
3	Bigelow Block	Bigelow Block	February 24, 1975 (#75000268)	NE Corner of Forest and Salem Sts. 42°25′06″N 71°06′36″W		
4	Charles Brooks House	Charles Brooks House	June 18, 1975 (#75000269)	309 High St. 42°25′18″N 71°07′28″W		
5	Jonathan Brooks House	Jonathan Brooks House	June 26, 1975 (#75000270)	2 Woburn St. 42°25′18″N 71°07′26″W		
6	Shepherd Brooks Estate	Shepherd Brooks Estate	April 21, 1975 (#75000271)	275 Grove St. 42°26′00″N 71°08′22″W		
7	Paul Curtis House	Paul Curtis House	May 6, 1975 (#75000272)	114 South St. 42°25′02″N 71°07′01″W		
8	Fells Connector Parkways, Metropolitan System of Greater Boston	Fells Connector Parkways, Metropolitan System of Greater Boston	May 9, 2003 (#03000379)	Fellsway East:E. Border Rd. To Fellsway W Fellsway West: Fulton St. to Fellsway E Fellsway:Fellsway E to Wellington Br; 42°26′40″N 71°04′45″W		Extends into Malden.
9	George P. Fernald House	George P. Fernald House	April 30, 1976 (#76000258)	12 Rock Hill St. 42°25′14″N 71°07′23″W		
10	Jonathan Fletcher House	Jonathan Fletcher House	June 23, 1975 (#75000274)	283 High St. 42°25′18″N 71°07′23″W		
11	Grace Episcopal Church	Grace Episcopal Church	November 3, 1972 (#72000139)	160 High St. 42°25′12″N 71°07′00″W		
12	Isaac Hall House	Isaac Hall House	April 16, 1975 (#75000275)	43 High St. 42°25′07″N 71°06′41″W		
13	Hillside Avenue Historic District	Hillside Avenue Historic District	April 21, 1975 (#75000276)	Property on both sides of Hillside and Grand View Aves. 42°25′13″N 71°06′46″W		
14	Lawrence Light Guard Armory	Lawrence Light Guard Armory	March 10, 1975 (#75000277)	90 High St. 42°25′07″N 71°06′47″W		
15	Joseph K. Manning House	Joseph K. Manning House	April 7, 1989 (#88000712)	35–37 Forest St. 42°25′11″N 71°06′37″W		
16	John H. McGill House	John H. McGill House	April 9, 1980 (#80000640)	56 Vernon St. 42°25′28″N 71°07′41″W		
17	Medford Pipe Bridge	Medford Pipe Bridge	January 18, 1990 (#89002253)	Over the Mystic River, between S. Court St. and Mystic Valley Parkway. 42°25′06″N 71°06′44″W		
18	Middlesex Canal Historic and Archeological District	Middlesex Canal Historic and Archeological District	November 19, 2009 (#09000936)	Numerous locations along the historic route of the Middlesex Canal; 42°25′03″N 71°07′50″W		Extends into other Middlesex County communities and Boston in Suffolk County.
19	Middlesex Fells Reservation Parkways	Middlesex Fells Reservation Parkways	February 4, 2003 (#02001749)	E Border Rd., Fellsway E, Fellsway W, Hillcrest Pky., South St., Pond St., S Border Rd., Ravine Rd., and Woodland Rd. 42°26′43″N 71°06′10″W		Included roadways are in Medford, Stoneham, and Winchester.
20	Middlesex Fells Reservoirs Historic District	Middlesex Fells Reservoirs Historic District	January 18, 1990 (#89002249)	Roughly bounded by Pond St., Woodland Rd., I-93, and MA 28; 42°27′18″N 71°05′43″W		Extends into Stoneham.
21	Mystic Dam	Mystic Dam	January 18, 1990 (#89002282)	Between Lower and Upper Mystic Lakes; 42°25′50″N 71°08′56″W		Extends between Medford and Arlington; incorrectly listed as being in Winchester
22	Mystic Gatehouse	Mystic Gatehouse	January 18, 1990 (#89002284)	East of Edgewater Pl. on the southeastern end of Upper Mystic Lake; 42°25′52″N 71°08′52″W		Incorrectly listed as being in Winchester.
23	Mystic Valley Parkway, Metropolitan Park System of Greater Boston MPS	Mystic Valley Parkway, Metropolitan Park System of Greater Boston MPS	January 18, 2006 (#05001529)	Mystic Valley Parkway; 42°25′47″N 71°07′49″W		Runs through Arlington, Medford, Somerville, and Winchester.
24	Edward Oakes House	Edward Oakes House	April 9, 1980 (#80000639)	5 Sylvia Rd. 42°24′43″N 71°06′39″W		
25	Old Medford High School	Old Medford High School	October 6, 1983 (#83004068)	22-24 Forest St. 42°25′15″N 71°06′32″W		Now houses condominiums and a community theater.
26	Old Ship Street Historic District	Old Ship Street Historic District	April 14, 1975 (#75000279)	Both sides of Pleasant St. from Riverside Ave. to Park St. 42°24′59″N 71°06′06″W		
27	Park Street Railroad Station	Park Street Railroad Station	April 21, 1975 (#75000280)	20 Magoun Ave. 42°24′59″N 71°05′55″W		Now houses a community service organization.
28	Richard Pinkham House	Richard Pinkham House	January 16, 2008 (#07001399)	24 Brooks Park; 42°24′43″N 71°06′35″W		
29	Revere Beach Parkway-Metropolitan Park System of Greater Boston	Revere Beach Parkway-Metropolitan Park System of Greater Boston	December 6, 2007 (#07001241)	Revere Beach Pkwy; 42°24′16″N 71°01′49″W		Extends into Everett and Chelsea
30	Isaac Royall House	Isaac Royall House	October 15, 1966 (#66000786)	15 George St. 42°24′43″N 71°06′44″W		
31	Salem Street Burying Ground	Salem Street Burying Ground	August 27, 1981 (#81000115)	Medford Sq. 42°25′05″N 71°06′27″W		
32	Peter Tufts House	Peter Tufts House	November 24, 1968 (#68000044)	350 Riverside Ave. 42°24′40″N 71°05′39″W		
33	Unitarian Universalist Church and Parsonage	Unitarian Universalist Church and Parsonage	April 21, 1975 (#75000281)	141 and 147 High St. 42°25′13″N 71°06′55″W		
34	US Post Office-Medford Main	US Post Office-Medford Main	June 18, 1986 (#86001346)	20 Forest St. 42°25′08″N 71°06′36″W		
35	John Wade House	John Wade House	June 18, 1975 (#75000282)	253 High St. 42°25′15″N 71°07′18″W		
36	Jonathan Wade House	Jonathan Wade House	April 21, 1975 (#75000283)	13 Bradlee Rd. 42°25′08″N 71°06′39″W		
