= Hillside Avenue Historic District (Medford, Massachusetts) =

Historic district in Massachusetts, United States

- U.S. National Register of Historic Places
- U.S. Historic district
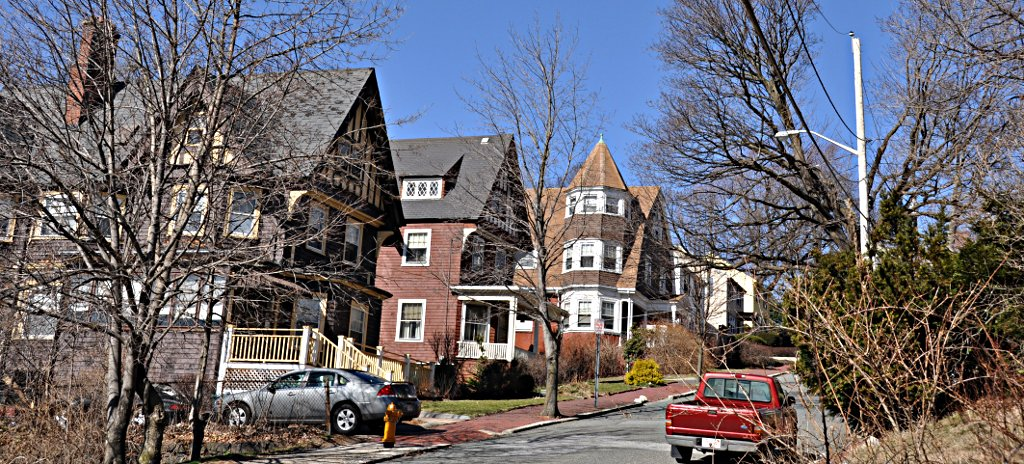
- A view of Hillside Avenue

- Location within Massachusetts Location within the United States
- Location: Medford, Massachusetts
- Coordinates: 42°25′13″N 71°6′46″W
- Architect: Multiple
- Architectural style: Colonial Revival, Tudor Revival, Queen Anne
- NRHP reference No.: 75000276
- Added to NRHP: April 21, 1975

The Hillside Avenue Historic District of Medford, Massachusetts encompasses a well-preserved late 19th-century residential subdivision. It consists of fifteen properties on Hillside and Grand View Avenues, near the downtown area of the city. Most of the houses in the district are Queen Anne Victorians, built in the 1890s; there are a number of Colonial Revival, Tudor, and Shingle style homes, all dating in construction between 1875 and 1895. Of particular note is the Bela Warner house at 35 Hillside Avenue, a dramatically sited Shingle style house built 1881–82.

The district was listed on the National Register of Historic Places in 1975.

== See also ==
- National Register of Historic Places listings in Medford, Massachusetts
- National Register of Historic Places listings in Middlesex County, Massachusetts
