= Isaac Hall House =

Historic house in Massachusetts, United States

- U.S. National Register of Historic Places
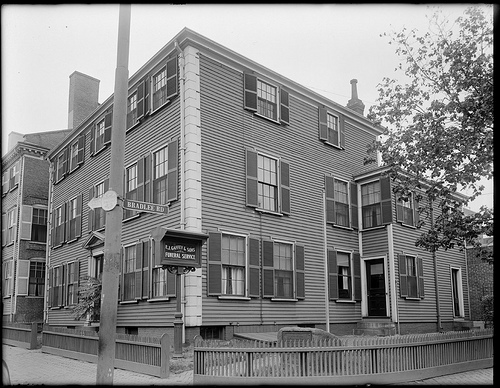

- Location within Massachusetts Location within the United States
- Location: 43 High Street, Medford, Massachusetts
- Coordinates: 42°25′7″N 71°6′41″W
- Built: 1720
- Architect: Hall, Andrew
- Architectural style: Federal
- NRHP reference No.: 75000275
- Added to NRHP: April 16, 1975

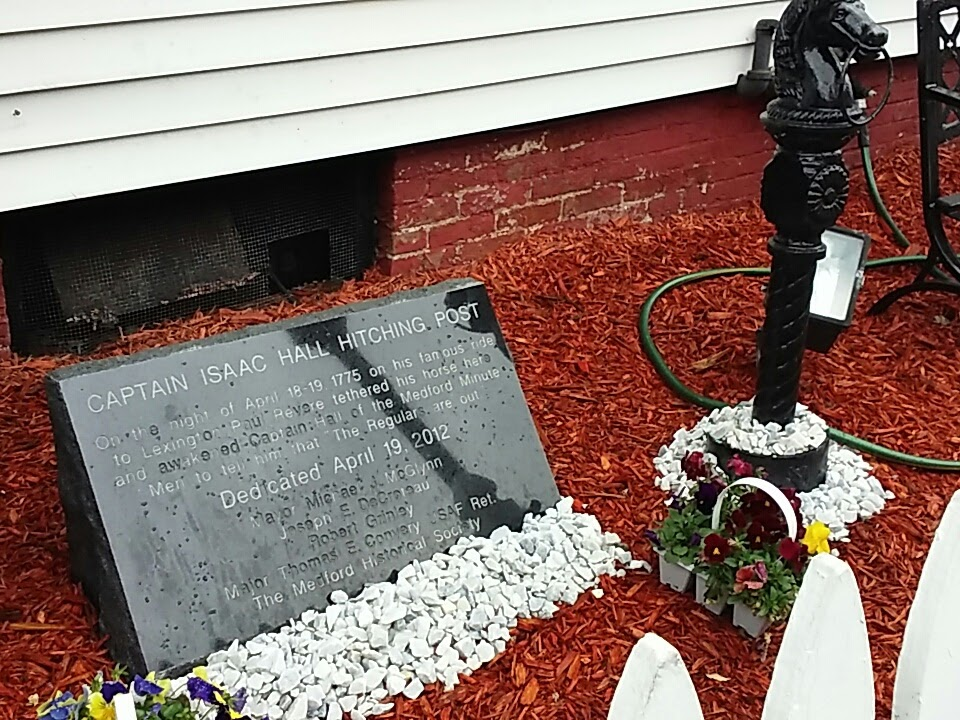
Paul Revere parked here

The Isaac Hall House is a historic house located at 43 High Street in Medford, Massachusetts.

== Description and history ==
Built c. 1720 by Andrew Hall, it is the oldest surviving house in Medford Square. The three-story wood-frame house was extensively remodeled in the Federal style in c. 1780 by Hall's son Isaac. The house also has a prominent history in the American Revolutionary War: Isaac Hall was the captain of the Medford minute company, and his house is one of the places Paul Revere stopped on the night of April 18–19, 1775 before the Battles of Lexington and Concord.

The house was listed on the National Register of Historic Places on April 16, 1975. It now houses a funeral home, but is being changed to a mosque in 2019.

== See also ==
- National Register of Historic Places listings in Medford, Massachusetts
- National Register of Historic Places listings in Middlesex County, Massachusetts
