= Old Medford High School =

- U.S. National Register of Historic Places
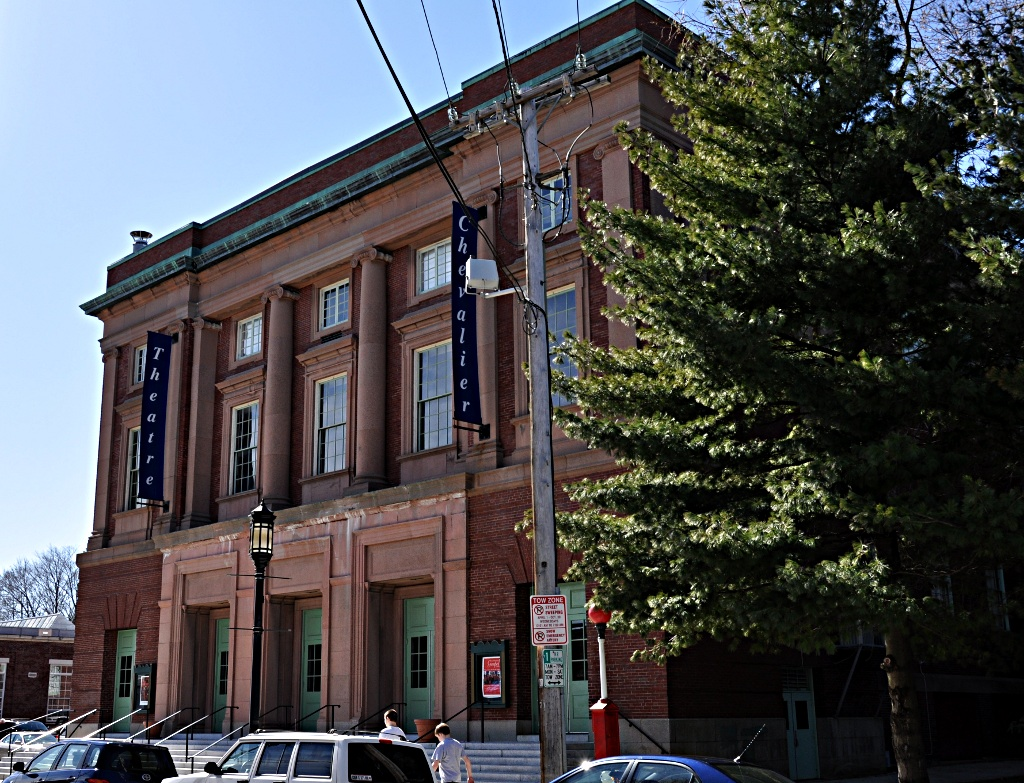
- One wing of the old school

- Location within Massachusetts Location within the United States
- Location: Medford, Massachusetts
- Coordinates: 42°25′14″N 71°06′33″W
- Built: 1894
- Architect: Hartwell and Richardson, Dyer, Michael
- Architectural style: Renaissance, Colonial
- NRHP reference No.: 83004068
- Added to NRHP: October 6, 1983

The Old Medford High School is a historic high school building at 48–64 Forest Street in Medford, Massachusetts. The building presently houses condominiums and the Chevalier Theatre.

It was built in 1894–1896 and added to the National Register of Historic Places in 1983.

In 1914, an addition was added to the building, nearly doubling it in size, due to the growth of Medford. In 1929 the north wing was constructed, followed by the south wing ten years later. In 1984, the city sold the building to a property developer to convert it into condominiums.

== See also ==
- National Register of Historic Places listings in Medford, Massachusetts
- National Register of Historic Places listings in Middlesex County, Massachusetts
