= Grace Episcopal Church (Medford, Massachusetts) =

Historic church in Massachusetts, United States

- U.S. National Register of Historic Places
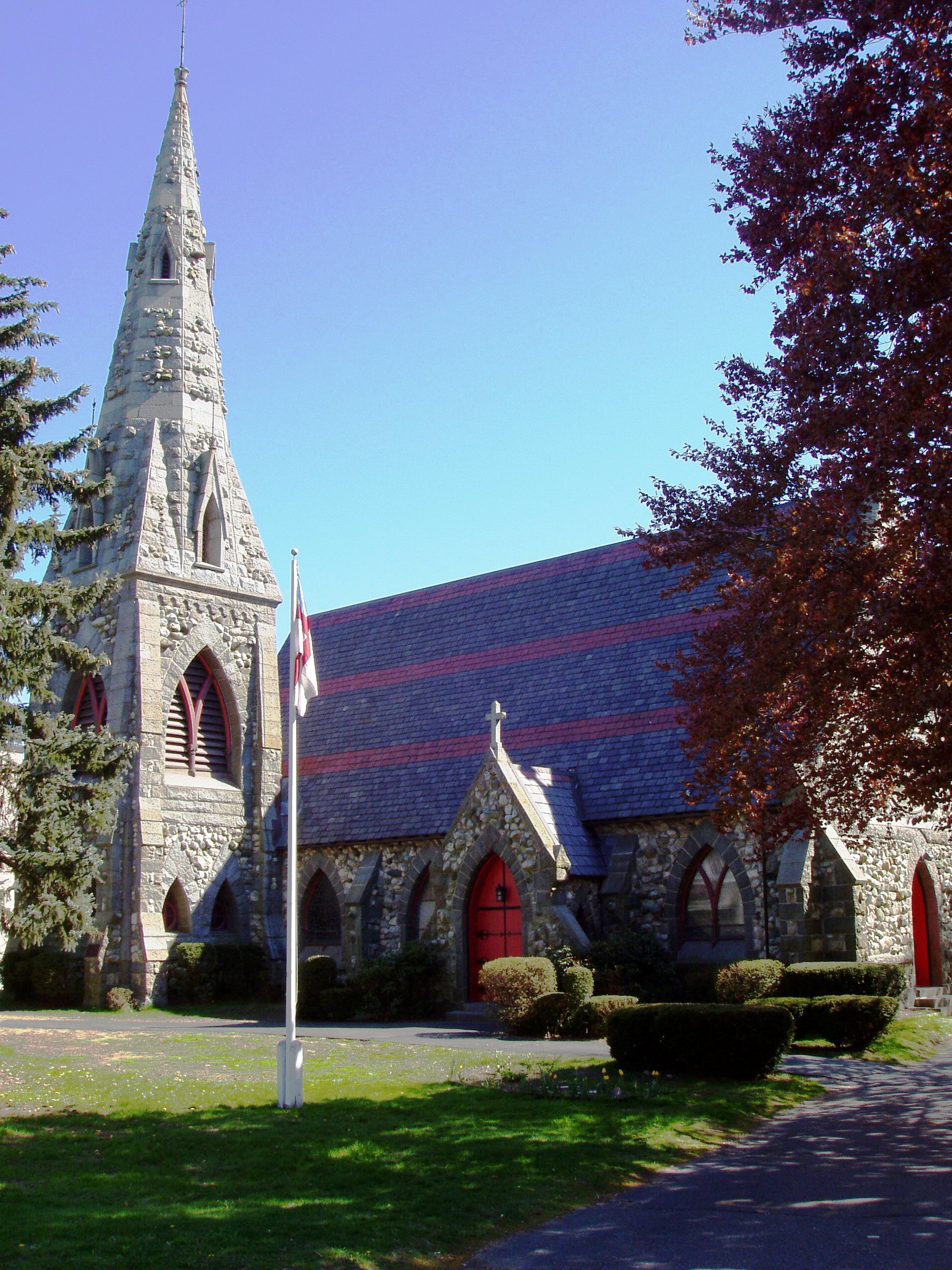
- Grace Episcopal Church
- Location: 160 High St. Medford, Massachusetts
- Coordinates: 42°25′12.01″N 71°07′00.24″W
- Built: 1867-69
- Architect: Henry Hobson Richardson
- NRHP reference No.: 72000139
- Added to NRHP: November 3, 1972

The Grace Episcopal Church is an Episcopal church designed by noted American architect H. H. Richardson, with a major stained glass window by John LaFarge. It is located at 160 High Street, Medford, Massachusetts and now listed on the National Register of Historic Places.

The church reported 456 members in 2016 and 502 members in 2023; no membership statistics were reported in 2024 parochial reports. Plate and pledge income reported for the congregation in 2024 was $272,111 with average Sunday attendance (ASA) of 136 persons.

The church was constructed 1867-1869. It is one of Richardson's earliest works and the second of his churches (now the earliest remaining since his Unity Church, Springfield, has been demolished). Its cornerstone was laid in 1867 but by August 1868 it was evident that construction costs would exceed the budget. After the Brooks family covered the remaining construction costs, it became a private chapel under Episcopal law. In 1873 the family delivered the church to the parish, and it then was consecrated by the Bishop of Maine.

The church is designed in a picturesque Gothic style with 90-foot (27 m) high steeple (square base, octagonal spire), asymmetrical massing, and rough-cut walls of glacial boulder with granite trim. A massive slate roof, in gray with bands of red slate, dominates the nave's low walls and the five-sided apse attached to its east wall.

The church has undergone extensive modifications from its original design. In 1882 a Sunday school annex was appended, in 1883 the nave interior was redecorated, and in 1957 further additions were made. In 1962 the chancel was reworked and Richardson's original altar given to the Brooklyn Museum. In the early 1970s Richardson's dark-stained interior was replaced by a brighter woodwork. As of 2007 only the pulpit remains of his original interior. LaFarge's window, "Rebecca at the Well", forms the center of the nave's south wall, and was probably installed in 1884 or 1885.

== Gallery ==
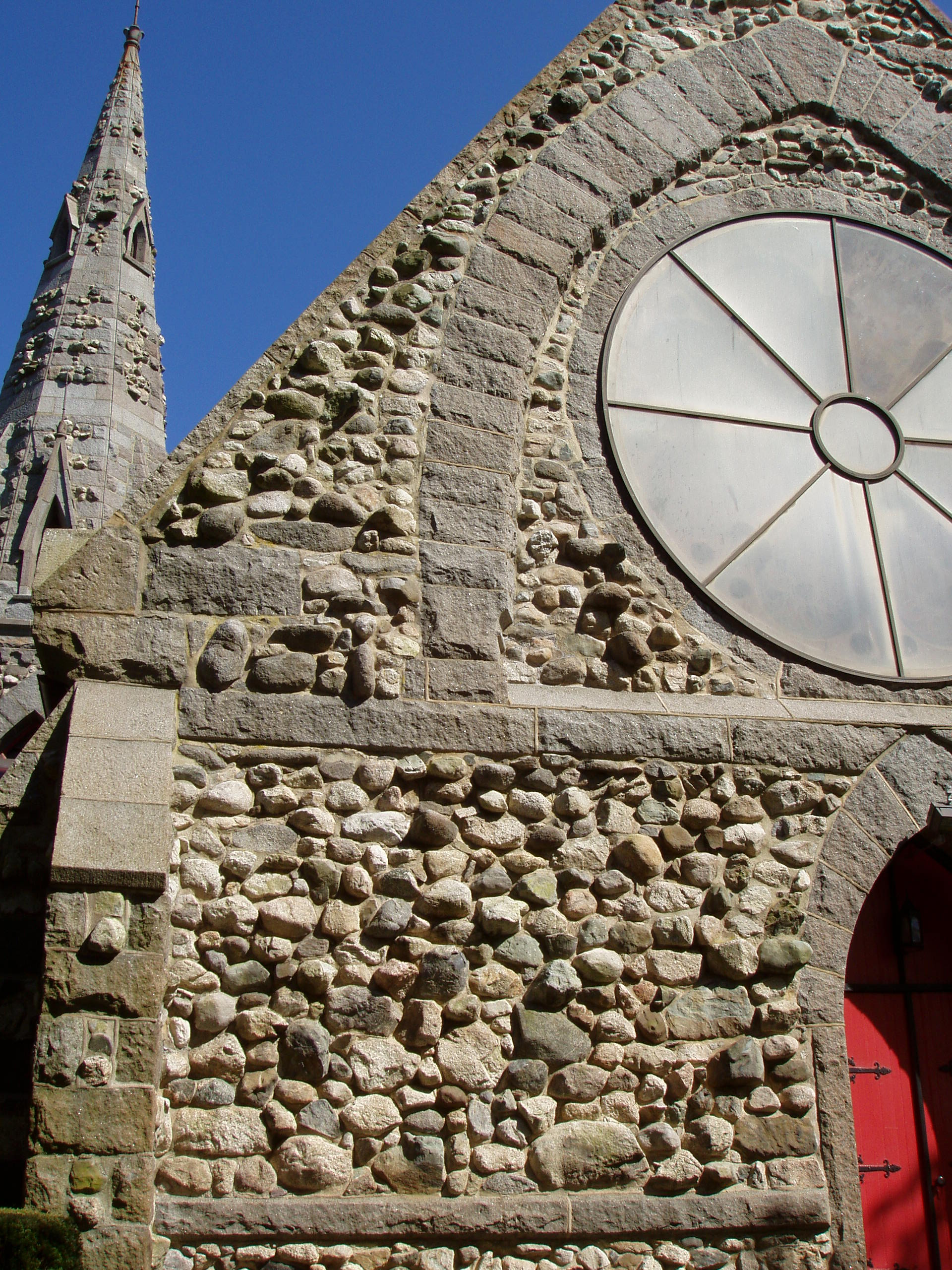
West facade

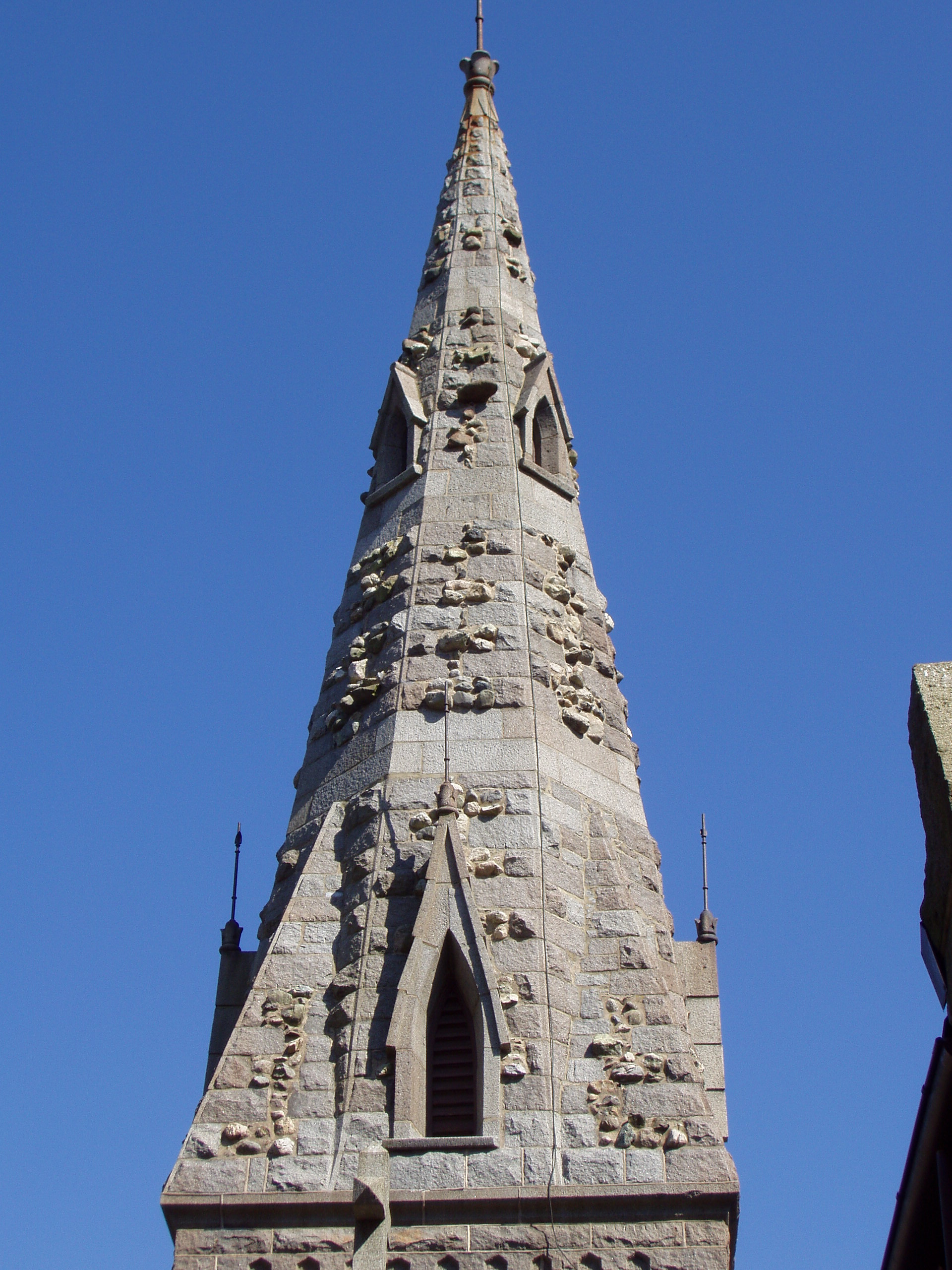
Steeple detail

== See also ==
- National Register of Historic Places listings in Medford, Massachusetts
- National Register of Historic Places listings in Middlesex County, Massachusetts
