= Jonathan Wade House =

Historic house in Massachusetts, United States

- U.S. National Register of Historic Places
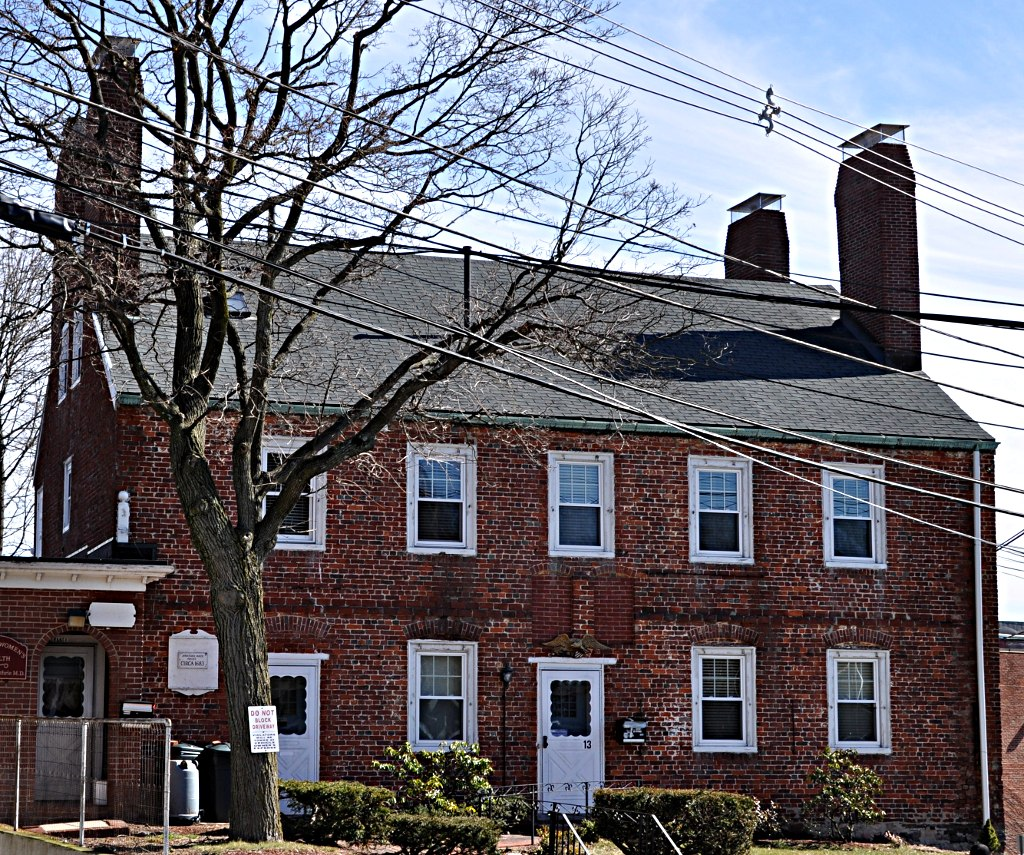

- Location within Massachusetts Location within the United States
- Location: Medford, Massachusetts
- Coordinates: 42°25′8″N 71°6′39″W
- Built: 1683
- NRHP reference No.: 75000283
- Added to NRHP: April 21, 1975

The Jonathan Wade House is a historic First Period house at 13 Bradlee Road in Medford, Massachusetts. It is one of a handful of houses in the city with brickwork from the 17th century (the other two known survivors are the Isaac Royall House and the Peter Tufts House). A brick house is known to have been standing on this site in 1689, when Jonathan Wade, Jr., died. The house was given Georgian styling in the mid-18th century, and was owned for many years in the 19th century by Samuel C. Lawrence, Medford's first mayor.

The house was listed on the National Register of Historic Places in 1975.

The house was used as a medical office for many years, most recently by Dr. Ellen Guthrie, an obstetrician and gynecologist. It was sold in January 2024 for $1.23 million.

== See also4 ==
- List of the oldest buildings in Massachusetts
- National Register of Historic Places listings in Medford, Massachusetts
- National Register of Historic Places listings in Middlesex County, Massachusetts
