= Jonathan Fletcher House =

Historic house in Massachusetts, United States

- U.S. National Register of Historic Places
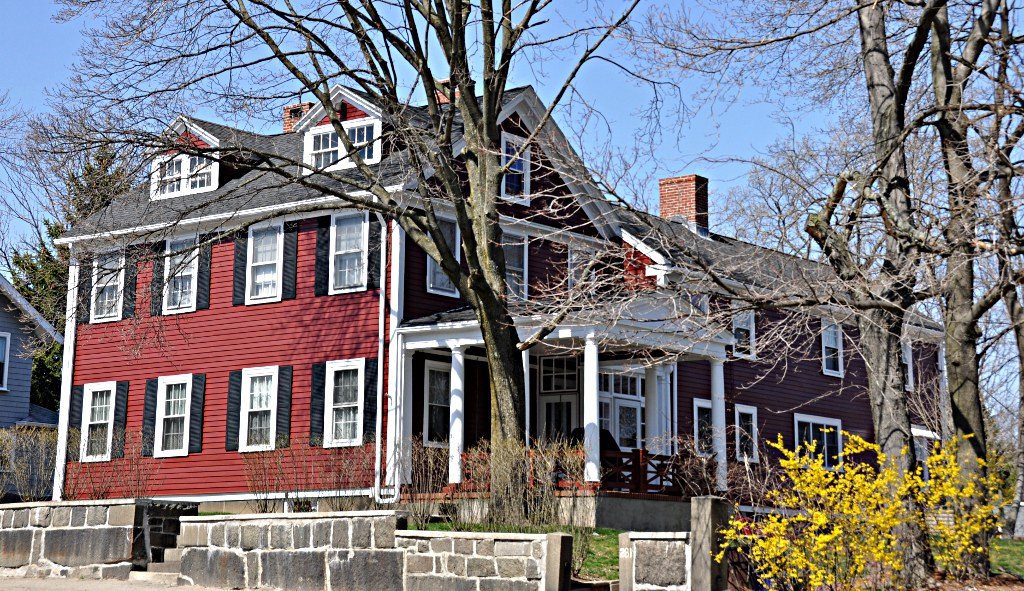

- Location within Massachusetts Location within the United States
- Location: 285 High St., Medford, Massachusetts
- Coordinates: 42°25′18″N 71°7′23″W
- Area: less than one acre
- Built: c. 1835
- Architectural style: Greek Revival, Federal
- NRHP reference No.: 75000274
- Added to NRHP: June 23, 1975

The Jonathan Fletcher House is a historic house in Medford, Massachusetts. The 2 1/2-story wood-frame house was built c. 1835; its builder clearly drew inspiration from designs published by Asher Benjamin, and is an excellent example of transitional Federal-Greek Revival architecture. The house was listed on the National Register of Historic Places in 1975.

== Description and history ==
The Jonathan Fletcher House is located roughly midway between the village centers of Medford and West Medford, on the north side of High Street at its junction with Hastings Lane. The setting includes a period granite retaining wall, with steps and a hitching post. It is a 2 1/2-story wood-frame structure, with a front gable roof and shingled exterior. The front facade is three bays wide, its first floor left bays sheltered by a deep porch supported by six Tuscan columns. The main entrance is in the right bay, sheltered by a glassed vestibule. A two-story ell extends to the right, its gable roof perpendicular to and lower than the main roof. The interior retains a number of original features and finishes, some of them closely copied from pattern books published by Asher Benjamin.

The house was built about 1835 by Jonathan Fletcher, on land that had previously seen industrial use as a tannery by the locally prominent Brooks family. There is some evidence suggesting the ell is older than the main block: documentation indicates a house was standing here in 1795, and the paneling and hearth locations of the ell are suggestive that there was once a central chimney in the structure.

== See also ==
- National Register of Historic Places listings in Medford, Massachusetts
- National Register of Historic Places listings in Middlesex County, Massachusetts
