= Medford branch (Boston and Maine Railroad) =

Former railway line in Massachusetts

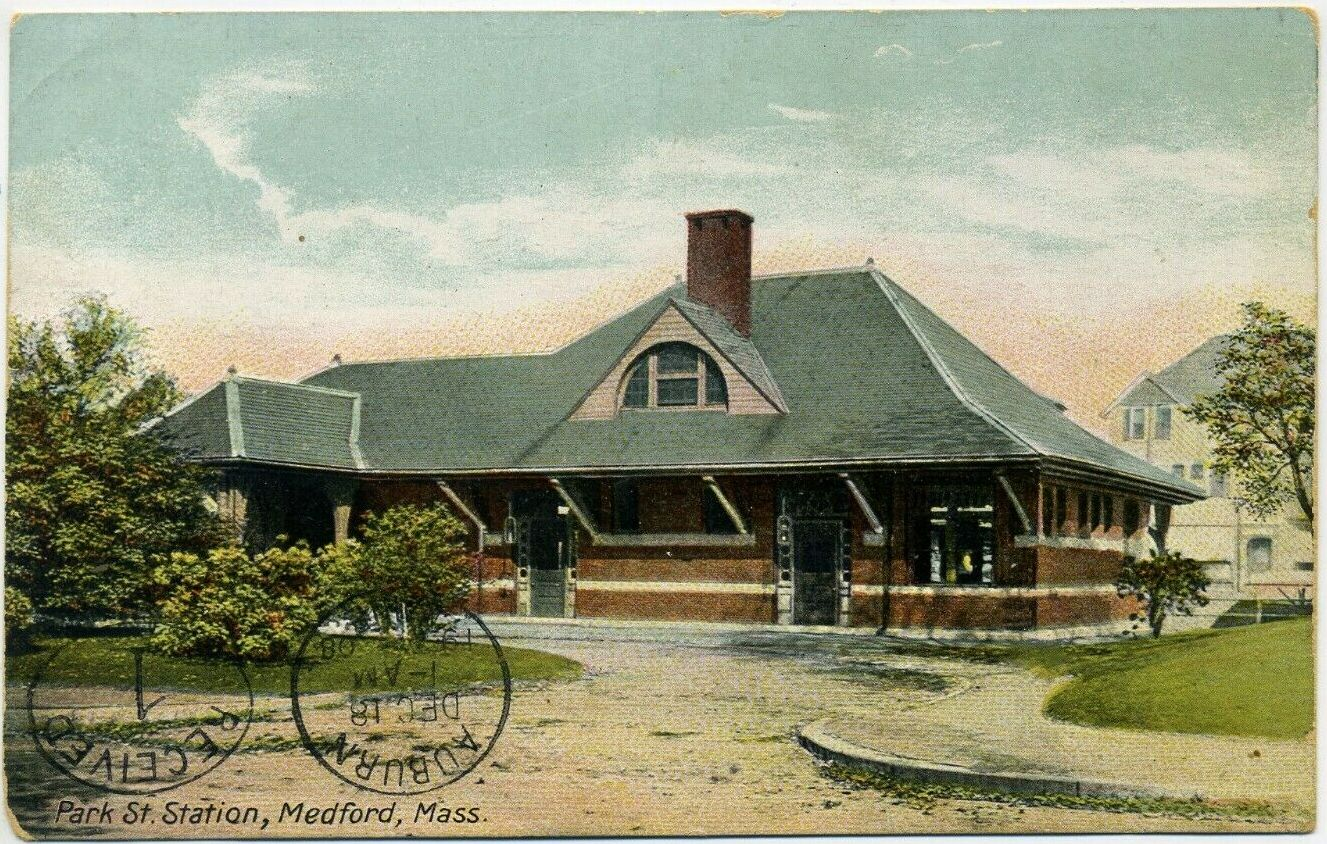
- Park Street station around 1908

Overview
- Stations: 3

Service
- System: Boston and Maine Railroad

History
- Opened: 1847
- Closed: October 1, 1957 (passenger service); 2010 (freight service)

Technical
- Line length: 1.8 mi (2.9 km)
- Track gauge: 4 ft 8 1/2 in (1,435 mm)

The Medford branch was a railroad branch line of the Boston and Maine Railroad (B&M). Located entirely within Medford, Massachusetts, the branch connected Medford Square to the B&M main line. It had passenger service from 1847 to 1957, with freight service on the inner part of the line until 2010.

== History ==
The Boston and Lowell Railroad was built in 1835 through West Medford, followed by the Boston and Maine Railroad (B&M) through the east part of Medford in 1844. On March 7, 1845, the state legislature approved the charter of the Medford Branch Rail-road Company to build a branch line from the B&M mainline to Medford Square. The railroad had been formed by a group of citizens including James O. Curtis earlier that year. The group almost immediately acted on the charter provision which allowed them to transfer the line to the B&M, which constructed the line and opened it as the Medford branch on March 2, 1847. It ran about 1.86 miles (2.99 km) from Medford Junction (north of Wellington station) to Medford Square.

By 1875, an intermediate station - East Medford - had been added at Spring Street. A second stop at Park Street was added by 1889. The East Medford station had been renamed Glenwood by then, and was relocated slightly to the east by 1900.

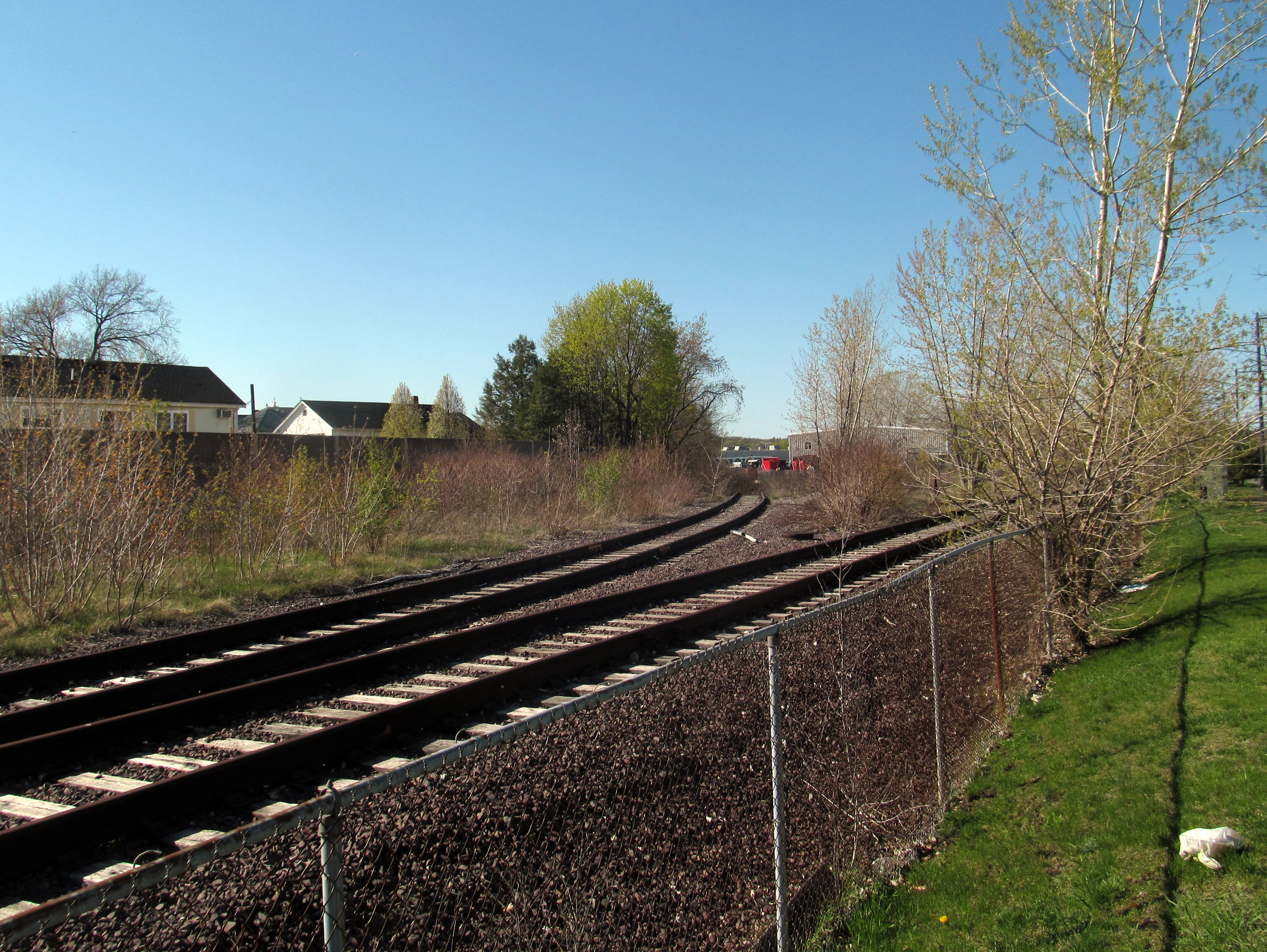
The remaining spur to the Medford branch, seen in 2017

In the 1890s, the B&M double-tracked the branch to provide more frequent service to compete with electric streetcars. The branch was then a busy commuter route; at the peak levels of B&M service in 1906, the branch had 21 daily round trips. However, ridership was soon decimated by the streetcars operated by the Boston Elevated Railway and the Bay State Street Railway. The B&M attempted to end service in 1917; after negotiations with the town, the railroad kept four daily round trips. This increased slightly to six daily round trips by 1919. Operation of a gasoline-electric railcar on the branch was considered in 1925.

Service on the branch was discontinued for some period in 1933–34; the station buildings remained closed after service resumed. They later reopened, but were abandoned around 1943 to reduce the B&M tax bill. As a marginal route, the branch was often closed entirely during service disruptions like those caused by the April 1946 and March 1948 coal mine strikes. By 1949, only a single daily round trip remained. This trip was discontinued on October 1, 1957.

The section of the line between Park Street and Medford Square was abandoned in 1959, with the Northern Expressway soon built across it. The section between Park Street and Glenwood was abandoned two years later, while freight service continued on the remaining section. In the early 1970s, an underpass for the Orange Line and Reading Line was built at Medford Junction as part of the Haymarket North Extension. (Never-realized plans in the 1940s had called for the Medford branch to be reused as an Orange Line branch.) Regular freight service ended in 2008, though a single trip to deliver a single carload of fish was run in 2010. The only remaining station structure is the Park Street station, which was added to the National Register of Historic Places in 1975.
