= Mystic Water Works =

Historic building in Somerville, Massachusetts

- Mystic Water Works; Mystic Pumping Station
- U.S. National Register of Historic Places
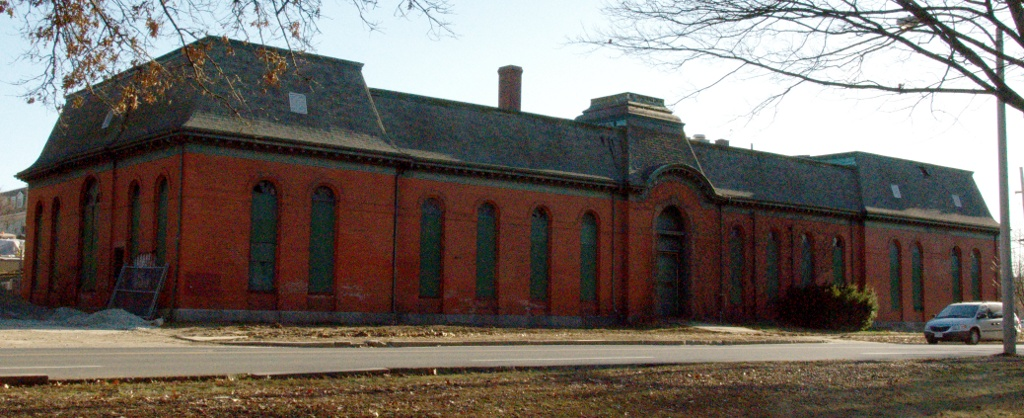
- The water works in 2009

- Location within Massachusetts Location within the United States
- Location: Alewife Brook Parkway at Capen St., Somerville, Massachusetts
- Coordinates: 42°24′54″N 71°7′52″W
- Built: 1863
- Architectural style: Romanesque
- MPS: City of Somerville MPS, Water Supply System of Metropolitan Boston MPS
- NRHP reference No.: 89001227,89002255
- Added to NRHP: September 18, 1989 and January 18, 1990

The Mystic Water Works, also called the Mystic Pumping Station, is a historic water works at Alewife Brook Parkway and Capen Street in Somerville, Massachusetts. Built in 1862–65 by the city of Charlestown (since annexed to Boston), it is a significant example of a mid-19th century waterworks facility. The building has been listed twice on the National Register of Historic Places. The first, in 1989, is part of the city of Somerville's listings, and was made under the name "Mystic Water Works". The second is part of an umbrella listing covering the entire historic water works system of Greater Boston, and was made in 1990, listed as the "Mystic Pumping Station".

== Description and history ==
The Mystic Water Works is located on the south side of the Mystic Valley Parkway, just east of its junction with the Alewife Brook Parkway, and just east of the mouth of Alewife Brook where it empties into the Mystic River. It is a large 1-1/2 story building, built out of load-bearing brick in a Romanesque Revival style with a mansard roof. Its original main block is nine bays wide, with a two bay addition made in 1870 to the east, and a five bay addition to the west in 1895, both stylistically similar to the original.

The building was built by the city of Charlestown as part of its initiative to dam the Mystic Lakes to provide it with water. Somerville was also allowed to tap into the lines, and the building thus became part of Somerville's first municipal water supply. When Charlestown became part of Boston in 1874 the building was taken over by that city's water authority, later known as the Metropolitan District Commission (MDC). When first built, it housed two steam-powered engines with a combined capability of moving 13 million gallons of water per day. The additions were built to provide space for addition pumps as the system was expanded to include Everett in 1870, and again in 1895. The facility was abandoned by the MDC in 1912, and its machinery scrapped. During World War I it housed offices, and in 1921 it was adapted for use as a machine shop. At the time of its listing on the National Register it was still in this use by the MDC. It was eventually acquired by the city of Somerville.

In 2016, the city of Somerville began conversion of the property into affordable senior housing units, with the exterior to be restored and some interior features retained. The renovation was completed in November 2017.

== See also ==
- National Register of Historic Places listings in Somerville, Massachusetts
