= Ten Hills, Somerville, Massachusetts =

Coordinates: 42.3973°N 71.086698°W

Map showing the Ten Hills neighborhood shaded in violet

Ten Hills is a neighborhood in the northeastern part of the city of Somerville, Massachusetts. The area is roughly wedge-shaped, about 50 acres (200,000 m^{2}) in size, and is bounded by the Mystic River to the north, McGrath Highway to the east, and is largely separated from the rest of Somerville by Interstate 93 to the southwest. Ten Hills is next to Assembly Square in the east, and Winter Hill in the southwest. The neighborhood landscape is predominated by a single hill (not ten, as the name suggests, although the original farm encompassed 550 more acres of Somerville which had the other 9), the peak of which is roughly at the intersection of Temple and Putnam Roads. The Ten Hills neighborhood is located in Ward 4, Precinct 1 of the City of Somerville, which is in the 34th district of Middlesex County.

== History ==
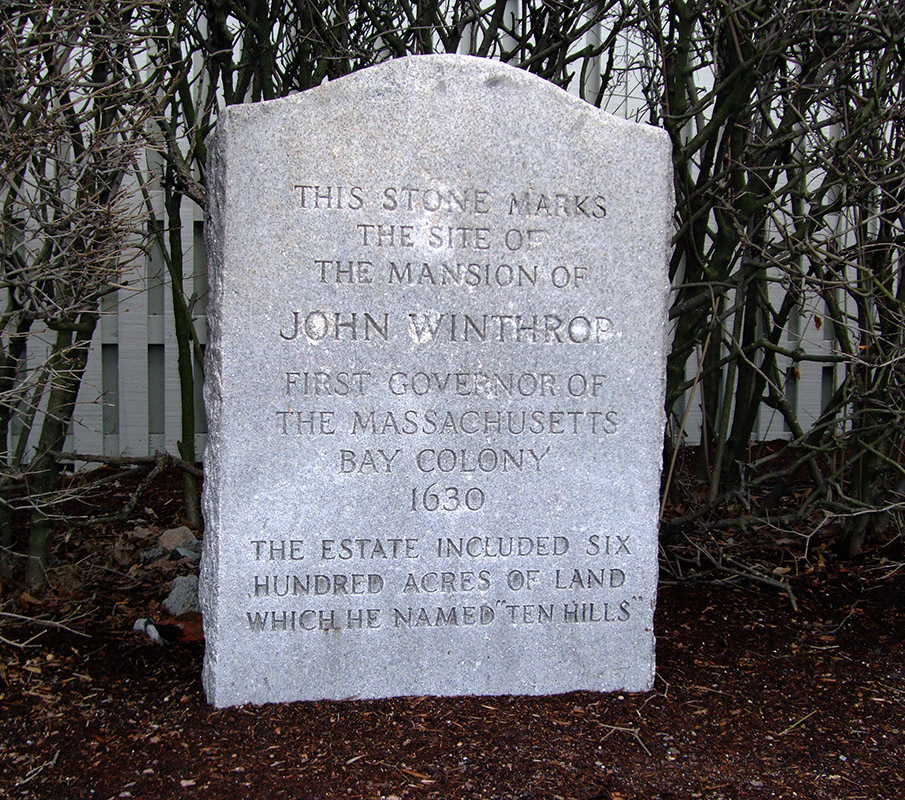
Historic marker at the intersection of Gov. Winthrop Road and Shore Drive, marking the site of John Winthrop's home in Ten Hills

Ten Hills is named after Ten Hills Farm, owned by Massachusetts' first governor, John Winthrop. This estate of 600 acres (2.4 km^{2}) was granted to Governor Winthrop by the Massachusetts Bay Colony on September 6, 1631. The farm was located along the southern bank of the Mystic River in portions of what are now the cities of Somerville and Medford.

It extended from Cradock Bridge, near Medford Centre, along the Mystic River, nearly to Convent Hill, and included all the land between Broadway, as far as the Powder House on the south and the river on the north.

The farm was named by Governor Winthrop for the ten small knolls located on the property, which included orchards and meadows for grazing cattle.

In 1649, the Ten Hills Farm was inherited by Gov. Winthrop's son, John the Younger, governor of Connecticut.

In 1677, the farm was deeded to Elizabeth Lidgett, widow of Peter Lidgett.

In 1732, the Lidgetts sold 504 acres (2.04 km^{2}) of the property, most of which was located in Medford, Massachusetts, to Isaac Royall Sr., a plantation owner and slave trader who lived in Antigua. Royall ordered the remodelling of a brick house on that property, which was originally built in 1692. Royall's son, Isaac Royall Jr., took possession of that property in 1739, and greatly expanded it. It still stands today and is known as the Isaac Royall House.

In 1740, the remaining 251 acres (1.02 km^{2}) of the Lidgett's property, located in Somerville, was sold to Captain Robert Temple, who owned that land through the Revolutionary War. Captain Temple built a luxurious mansion at Ten Hills Farm, overlooking the river, which lasted until it was torn down in 1877.

On September 1, 1774, General Thomas Gage ordered an expedition of 200 British troops up the Mystic River to remove provincial munitions. The British landed at Ten Hills Farm, and then proceeded to Powder House Square and took 250 barrels of gunpowder to Boston. The action sparked what became known as the Powder Alarm, in which thousands of colonists, believing an attack had been made, marched on Boston and Cambridge.

In 1832 Colonel Samuel Jaques, a well known horticulturalist and breeder of livestock bought Ten Hills Farm and made it famous as a stock farm.

In 1877, the farm was destroyed and much of the high ground was used to fill in surrounding marshlands.

In 1900, the Metropolitan Park Commission acquired land along the Mystic River in Ten Hills and built Melrose Street, now called Shore Drive. In 1908, the City of Somerville built a public bath house on Melrose Street which became a very popular spot for bathers in the Mystic River. A planned amusement park was never built, but a new bathhouse along the shore of the river was built sometime between 1925 and 1947.

In 1928, the City of Somerville bought the site for the purposes of building an elementary school, and in 1930, The Charles A. Grimmons Elementary School was opened for students.

In 1980, the Grimmons School was closed due to lack of enrollment. A portion of the land was retained for the construction of Grimmons Park.

== Recreation ==
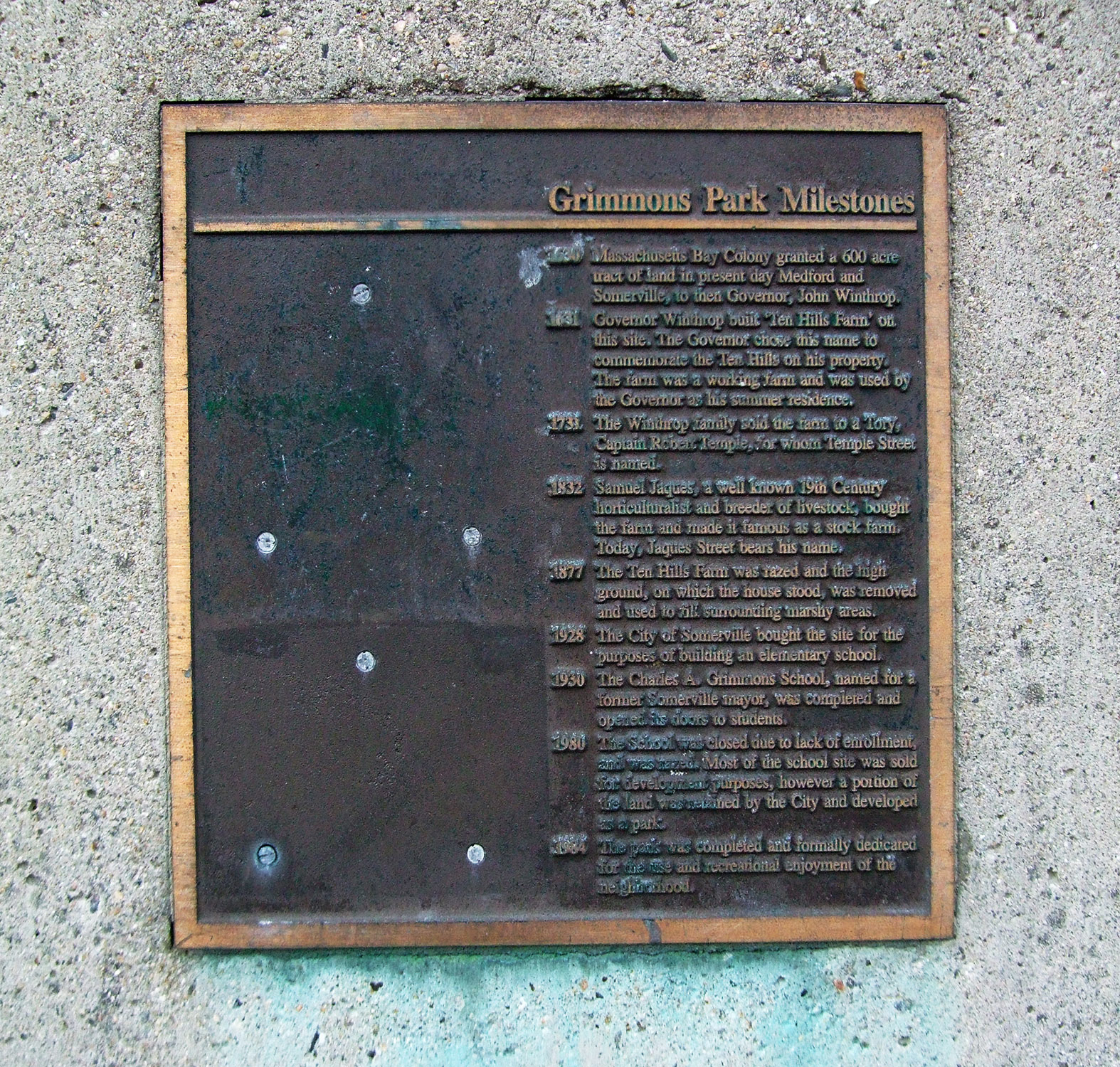
Historic plaque at Grimmons Park on Gov. Winthrop Road in Somerville, Massachusetts

The Blessings of the Bay Boathouse, named after the ship built by Governor Winthrop in 1631 is located on the Mystic River Reservation at 32 Shore Drive. The boathouse is currently owned by the Massachusetts Department of Conservation and Recreation. During the summer, canoes and paddleboats can be rented by the public for use on the Mystic River.

The Blessings of the Bay Boathouse is also home to the Gentle Giant Rowing Club. The Club is a not-for-profit, registered 501(c)3, organization dedicated to introducing and nurturing the sport of rowing, regardless of age, culture, financial ability or physical capability; and to improving and preserving the environment in and surrounding the rivers we row. Gentle Giant Rowing supports the rowing program for Somerville High School, which also rows out of the Blessing Boathouse, as does the rowing program of Wentworth Institute of Technology.

Grimmons Park is a small playground on Gov. Winthrop Road, which opened in 1984 on the site of the former Grimmons Elementary School. The park underwent a major renovation in 2009, partially funded by a $1,000,000 grant from IKEA for improvement of parks throughout the city of Somerville (IKEA had been planning to open a store in nearby Assembly Square).
