= Medford Public Schools =

School district located in Medford, Massachusetts

Location
- Medford, Massachusetts Greater Boston United States

District information
- Type: Public School district
- Motto: A caring educational partnership of school, family and community
- Grades: PK-12
- Superintendent: Suzanne Galusi (2025 - present) (interim)
- Asst. superintendent(s): Kimberly Talbot
- Accreditation: NEASC
- Schools: Elementary 4 Middle 2 High 3
- Budget: $81,387,668 total $17,043 per pupil (2016)
- NCES District ID: 2507560

Students and staff
- Students: 4,514 (2014-2015)
- Teachers: 393.9 (2014-2015)
- Staff: 636.1 (2014-2015)
- Student–teacher ratio: 11.5:1
- Athletic conference: Massachusetts Interscholastic Athletic Association
- District mascot: Mustang
- Colors: Royal Blue and White

Other information
- Website: Homepage

Medford Public Schools is a school district located in Medford, Massachusetts. The district has 9 schools in the city serving grades K-12. The main office is located in the High School/Vocational-Technical High School building at 489 Winthrop Street.

== Elementary schools ==
=== Brooks Elementary School ===
Brooks Elementary School

Location
- 388 High Street; Medford, Massachusetts 02155; United States
- Coordinates: 42.42145°N 71.12815°W

Information
- Principal: Ms. Shannon Demos
- Staff: 62.3
- Teaching staff: 39.8
- Grades: preK - 5
- Enrolment: 553 Students (2013-2014)
  - Pre-kindergarten: 13
  - Kindergarten: 83
  - Grade 1: 76
  - Grade 2: 98
  - Grade 3: 108
  - Grade 4: 86
  - Grade 5: 89
- Classes: 204
- Student to teacher ratio: 13.9:1
- MCAS average: % proficient and advanced: ELA: 61; Math: 55; Science: 57 (Spring 2014)
- Website: brooks.mps02155.org

Brooks Elementary School is located in the West Medford section of Medford, Massachusetts. It is named for John Brooks, who was born in Medford, became a Revolutionary War veteran, and was later Governor of Massachusetts from 1816 to 1823.

==== Former Principals ====
- 1994 - 2012 Michael Simon

=== Missituk Elementary School ===
Missituk Elementary School

Location
- 37 Hicks Avenue; Medford, Massachusetts 02155; United States
- Coordinates: 42.401°N 71.102°W

Information
- Principal: Nancy Sherman-Hudson
- Staff: 62.4
- Teaching staff: 41.4
- Grades: preK - 5
- Enrolment: 478 Students (2013-2014)
  - Pre-kindergarten: 9
  - Kindergarten: 89
  - Grade 1: 69
  - Grade 2: 89
  - Grade 3: 74
  - Grade 4: 72
  - Grade 5: 66
- Classes: 179
- Student to teacher ratio: 11.5:1
- MCAS average: % proficient and advanced: ELA: 46; Math: 39; Science: 51 (Spring 2014)
- Website: missituk.mps02155.org

Missituk Elementary School is located in the South Medford section of Medford, Massachusetts. Since the student population historically has had a large (over fifty percent) portion qualifying for free and reduced lunch, the Missituk School instituted a universal free breakfast program beginning in late 2008. Initial results included better attendance, fewer trips to the nurse and better student behavior.

==== Former Principals ====
- 1988 - 1992 Mr.Donovon
- 1992-1994 Mr.Swanson

=== John J. McGlynn Elementary School ===
John J. McGlynn Elementary School

Location
- 3002 Mystic Valley Parkway; Medford, Massachusetts 02155; United States
- Coordinates: 42.4093°N 71.0975°W

Information
- Principal: Andy O'Brien
- Staff: 61.2
- Teaching staff: 40.9
- Grades: preK - 5
- Enrolment: 549 Students (2013-2014)
  - Pre-kindergarten: 19
  - Kindergarten: 91
  - Grade 1: 83
  - Grade 2: 91
  - Grade 3: 86
  - Grade 4: 91
  - Grade 5: 88
- Classes: 184
- Student to teacher ratio: 13.4:1
- MCAS average: % proficient and advanced: ELA: 52; Math: 46; Science: 49 (Spring 2014)
- Website: mcglynnes.mps02155.org

Named after a former mayor of Medford, the John J. McGlynn Elementary School shares a building and campus with the McGlynn Middle School on the eastern bank of the Mystic River, between Medford Square and Wellington Circle. It is also immediately adjacent to the Andrews Middle School.

=== Milton Fuller Roberts Elementary School ===
Milton Fuller Roberts Elementary School

Location
- 35 Court Street; Medford, Massachusetts 02155; United States
- Coordinates: 42.422°N 71.0994°W

Information
- Established: 2 September 2003
- Principal: Kirk D. Johnson
- Staff: 75.1
- Teaching staff: 43.1
- Grades: preK - 5
- Enrolment: 565 Students (2013-2014)
  - Pre-kindergarten: 12
  - Kindergarten: 108
  - Grade 1: 76
  - Grade 2: 98
  - Grade 3: 91
  - Grade 4: 95
  - Grade 5: 85
- Classes: 207
- Student to teacher ratio: 13.1:1
- MCAS average: % proficient and advanced: ELA: 41; Math: 36; Science: 37 (Spring 2014)
- Website: roberts.mps02155.org

The Milton Fuller Roberts Elementary School was named after Lt. Milton F. Roberts, a veteran of the Civil War, Spanish–American War, and World War I. Originally a junior high school or middle school, it opened in that capacity in 1928 in the Glenwood neighborhood of north east Medford. It was converted into an elementary school in September 2003 as part of a series of school renovations across the district.

== Secondary schools ==
=== Madeleine Dugger Andrews Middle School ===
- Location: 3000 Mystic Valley Parkway, Medford, MA 02155
- Coordinates:42.4118°N 71.098°W
- Established: September 2000
- Principal: Ms. Jennifer Skanes
- Assistant Principal: Farah Lalli
- Staff: 72.3
- Teaching Staff: 50.4
- Grades: 6–8
- Enrollment: 519 Students (2013–2014)
  - Grade 6: 158
  - Grade 7: 175
  - Grade 8: 176
- Classes: 285
- Student:teacher ratio: 10.3:1
- MCAS % proficient and advanced: ELA: 68; Math: 47; Science: 41 (Spring 2014)
- URL: https://andrews.mps02155.org/

Madeleine Dugger Andrews Middle School is named after the first African-American member of the Medford School Committee. It was the first new school constructed in the district in eighty years. Located on the eastern bank of the Mystic river, south of Medford Square, it is immediately adjacent to the McGlynn schools.

Fulton Heights Academy which is part of Andrews Middle School is dedicated to special needs children with social/emotional and behavioral/academic disabilities.

=== John J. McGlynn Middle School ===
- Location: 3002 Mystic Valley Parkway, Medford, MA 02155
- Coordinates:42.4088°N 71.0977°W
- Established: September 2004
- Principal: Mr. Nick Tucci
- Staff: 64.1
- Teaching Staff: 46.6
- Grades: 6–8
- Enrollment: 531 Students (2013–2014)
  - Grade 6: 145
  - Grade 7: 192
  - Grade 8: 194
- Classes: 263
- Student:teacher ratio: 11.4:1
- MCAS % proficient and advanced: ELA: 70; Math: 38; Science: 48 (Spring 2014)
- URL: https://mcglynnms.mps02155.org/

=== Medford High School ===
- Location: 489 Winthrop Street, Medford, MA 02155
- Headmaster: Ms. Marta Cabral
- Enrollment: 1,332 Students
- URL: https://mhs-mvths.mps02155.org/

=== Medford Vocational-Technical High School ===
- Location: 489 Winthrop Street, Medford, MA 02155
- Director: Chad Fallon
- Enrollment: 257 Students
- URL: https://mhs-mvths.mps02155.org/

=== Curtis/Tufts Alternative School ===
- Location: 437 Main Street, Medford, MA 02155
- Program Director: Laurie Hodgdon
- Staff: 8.8
- Teaching Staff: 4.4
- Grades: 9–12
- Enrollment: 22 Students (2014–2015)
  - Grade 9: 1
  - Grade 10: 6
  - Grade 11: 7
  - Grade 12: 7
- Student:Teacher Ratio: 5:1
- URL: https://curtistufts.mps02155.org/
