= South Medford, Massachusetts =

Neighborhood in Medford, Massachusetts

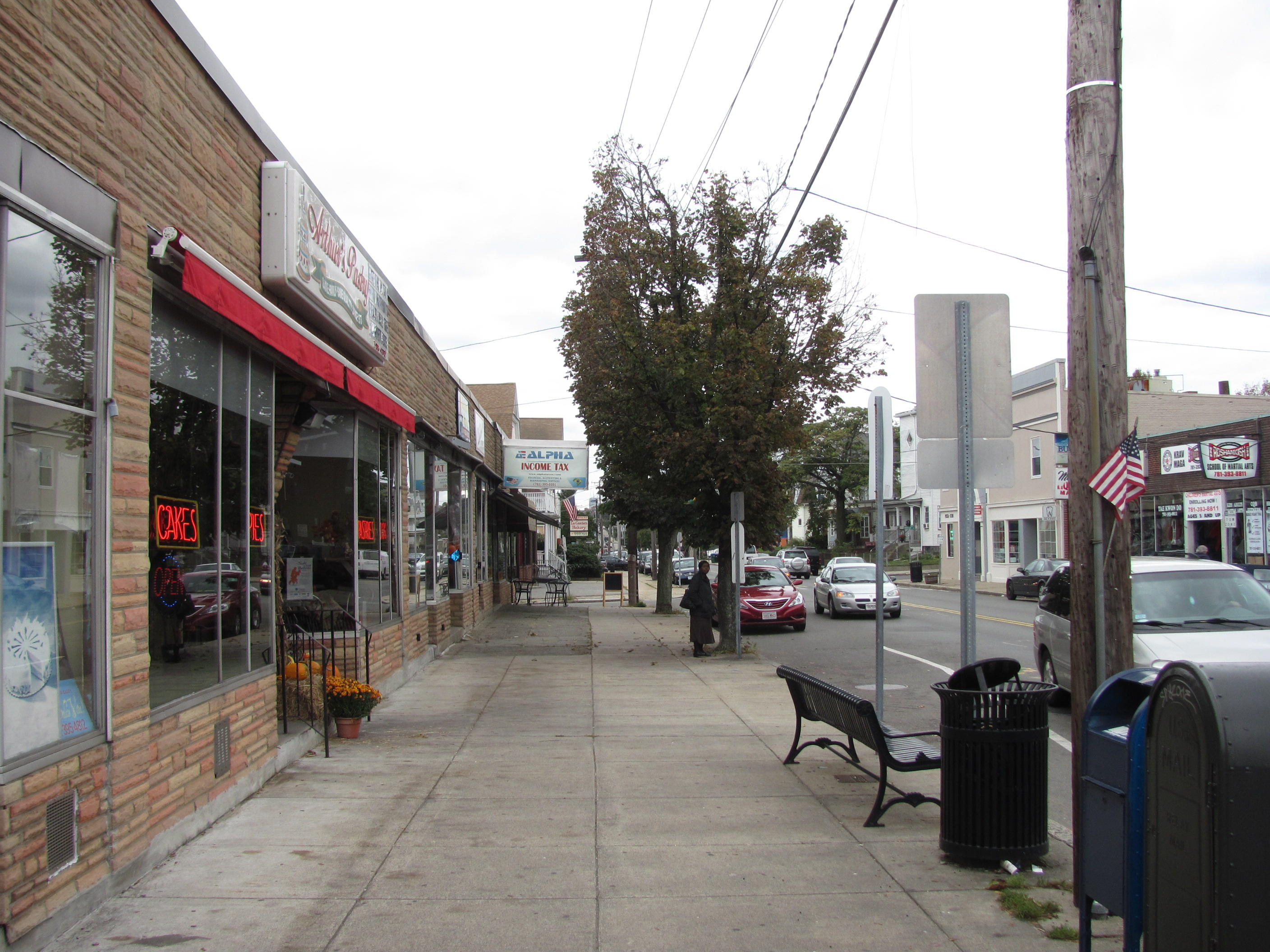
Main Street

South Medford is the southern neighborhood of Medford, Massachusetts.

== History ==
Medford was founded in 1630 by English settlers as part of Charlestown. The area remained predominantly rural and mostly White Anglo-Saxon Protestant ("WASP") in character for over two hundred years, during which the South Medford Baptist church and other institutions were founded.

Paul Revere's famous midnight ride traveled along Main Street in South Medford, continuing onto High Street in Medford Square. An annual re-enactment takes place honoring the historic event.

The Isaac Royall House, located on Main Street, once belonged to one of Harvard Law School's founders, Isaac Royall, Jr. It is a National Historic Landmark and local history museum. The house was used by Continental Army troops, including George Washington and John Stark, during the American Revolutionary War.

During the 17th century, a handful of major public roads (High Street, Main Street, Salem Street, "the road to Stoneham", and South Street) served the population, but the road network started a long-term expansion in the 18th century. The Medford Turnpike Company was incorporated in 1803, but turned what is now Mystic Avenue over to the city in 1866. The Andover Turnpike Company was incorporated in 1805, but turned what is now Forest Street and Fellsway West over to Medford in 1830.

Other major commercial transportation projects included the Middlesex Canal by 1803, the Boston and Lowell Railroad in West Medford in the 1830s, and the Boston and Maine Railroad to Medford Center in 1847.

The historic Stearns House was built in 1845 in the village, near a canal that closed in 1852. George Luther Stearns was an American industrialist and one of John Brown's Secret Six. His passion for the abolitionist cause shaped his life, bringing him into contact with the likes of Abraham Lincoln and Ralph Waldo Emerson and starting The Nation magazine. He was given the rank of major by Massachusetts Governor John Albion Andrew and spent most of the Civil War recruiting for the 54th and 55th Massachusetts regiments and the 5th cavalry.

South Medford is home to Tufts University, which was chartered in 1852. The Crane Theological School at Tufts opened in 1869. A horse-powered street railway began running to Somerville and Charlestown in 1860. In 1890, Medford was described as "an ancient and charming suburban town" with its own railway line, the Medford branch, although South Medford was then so rural as not to rate either its own rail station or its own post office. The street railway network expanded in the hands of various private companies, and went electric in the late 1890s, when trolleys to Everett and downtown Boston were available. Streetcars were converted to buses in the 20th century. Interstate 93 was constructed between 1956 and 1963.

== Location and demographics ==
South Medford is located in Middlesex County, Massachusetts, approximately 2 miles from Boston. The area that is now known as "South Medford" was originally known as "Mistick Field". It was transferred from Charlestown to Medford in 1754.

The neighborhood of South Medford has an area of 2.344 square miles (6.07 km^{2}), and a population of 22,132, making its population density 9,442 people per square mile, which is denser than Medford generally. The range of house values is between $400,000 and $700,000. Three-quarters of residents are of the "white" race.

South Medford is closer to Downtown Boston than most of Boston. Its southern borders stretch to Winter Hill, Somerville, Massachusetts, and its northern and eastern borders lie on the banks of the Mystic River along historic Medford Square. It borders the Medford Hillside neighborhood to the west. The Prudential Tower can be seen in the background looking south from Main Street. Charlestown, Boston is 1.6 miles (3.29 km) away from its southernmost border.

In the early parts of the 20th century, large waves of Italian and Irish immigrants began to settle into the areas just outside the center of Boston. South Medford soon became an enclave for Italian-Americans who brought with them the rich cultural heritage of "the old country" which they had previously bestowed so deeply upon Boston's North End neighborhood.

Since this wave of emigration the neighborhood has traditionally been largely Italian-American, with a sizable Irish-American population present as well. The community is known for its supposed tight knit nature. Residents apparently can still be heard speaking Italian in South Medford, as well as remnants from the rich Italian-American past such as a bocce court at the South Medford Fire Station. South Medford has more Italian bakeries than the North End of Boston. Legend has it that Frank Sinatra used to frequent DePasquale's (now Bocceli's) in South Medford, along with "Crazy Guggenheim" Frank Fontaine, and Rocky Marciano.

Apparently, City officials have proposed registering South Medford as an Italian-American historical district.

== Gentrification ==
As with its neighboring city of Somerville, Massachusetts, South Medford is experiencing a wave of Yuppie gentrification common in commuter friendly urban neighborhoods.

== Parks ==
South Medford is home to several urban parks, including:

- Tufts Park
- Columbus Park - 42.4013°N 71.1005°W. Adjacent to the Columbus Elementary School, this park consists almost entirely of two baseball fields (one with a concession stand) and a basketball court.
- Barry Park
- Spicer Field

== Notable residents ==
- Mike Pagliarulo - Former NY Yankees & San Diego Padres hitter
- Joe Sacco - NHL & U.S. Olympic hockey star, Toronto Maple Leafs
- Dave Sacco - NHL & U.S. Olympic hockey star, Mighty Ducks of Anaheim
- Keith Tkachuk - NHL & U.S. Olympic hockey star, Saint Louis Blues
- Shawn Bates - NHL hockey star, Boston bruins & NY Islanders
- Terri Lyne Carrington - Grammy Award-winning jazz drummer, composer, record producer and entrepreneur

== See also ==
- Green Line Extension
