= Medford School District =

Medford School District may refer to these U.S. school districts:

- Medford Public Schools, Massachusetts
- Medford School District (Oregon)
