= The American Museum (magazine) =

American monthly periodical (1789–1792)

The American Museum (also known as, The American Museum; or Repository of Ancient and Modern Fugitive Pieces &c. Prose and Poetical and The American Museum, or, Universal Magazine) was a monthly American literary magazine published by Mathew Carey in the late-18th century. The American Museum shares with the Columbian Magazine the honor of being the first successful American magazine.

Carey established the magazine in Philadelphia, Pennsylvania, using $400 that was given to him by Gilbert du Motier, Marquis de Lafayette. Carey published a total of 72 issues (twelve volumes) of the magazine—one each month from January 1787 to December 1792. The magazine reprinted significant historical documents of American history and also some original work.

In its first edition, The American Museum republished Thomas Paine's Common Sense. The proposed Constitution of the United States was first published in the magazine. Contributors to the magazine included John Adams, Timothy Dwight IV, Benjamin Franklin, Philip Freneau, Alexander Hamilton, Francis Hopkinson, David Humphreys, Thomas Jefferson, James Madison, Benjamin Rush, John Trumbull, George Washington and Noah Webster as well as Belinda Sutton and Prince Hall.

The American Museum had approximately 1,250 subscribers, including many of the notable men of the United States. (In the July 1787 edition, Carey included a list of subscribers, which included Benjamin Franklin, John Jay, Thomas Jefferson, James Madison, and George Washington.) However, many of the subscriptions were credit accounts and the magazine was not profitable. As a result, Carey was forced to stop publication at the end of 1792.
