= Belinda Sutton =

18th-century reparations activist

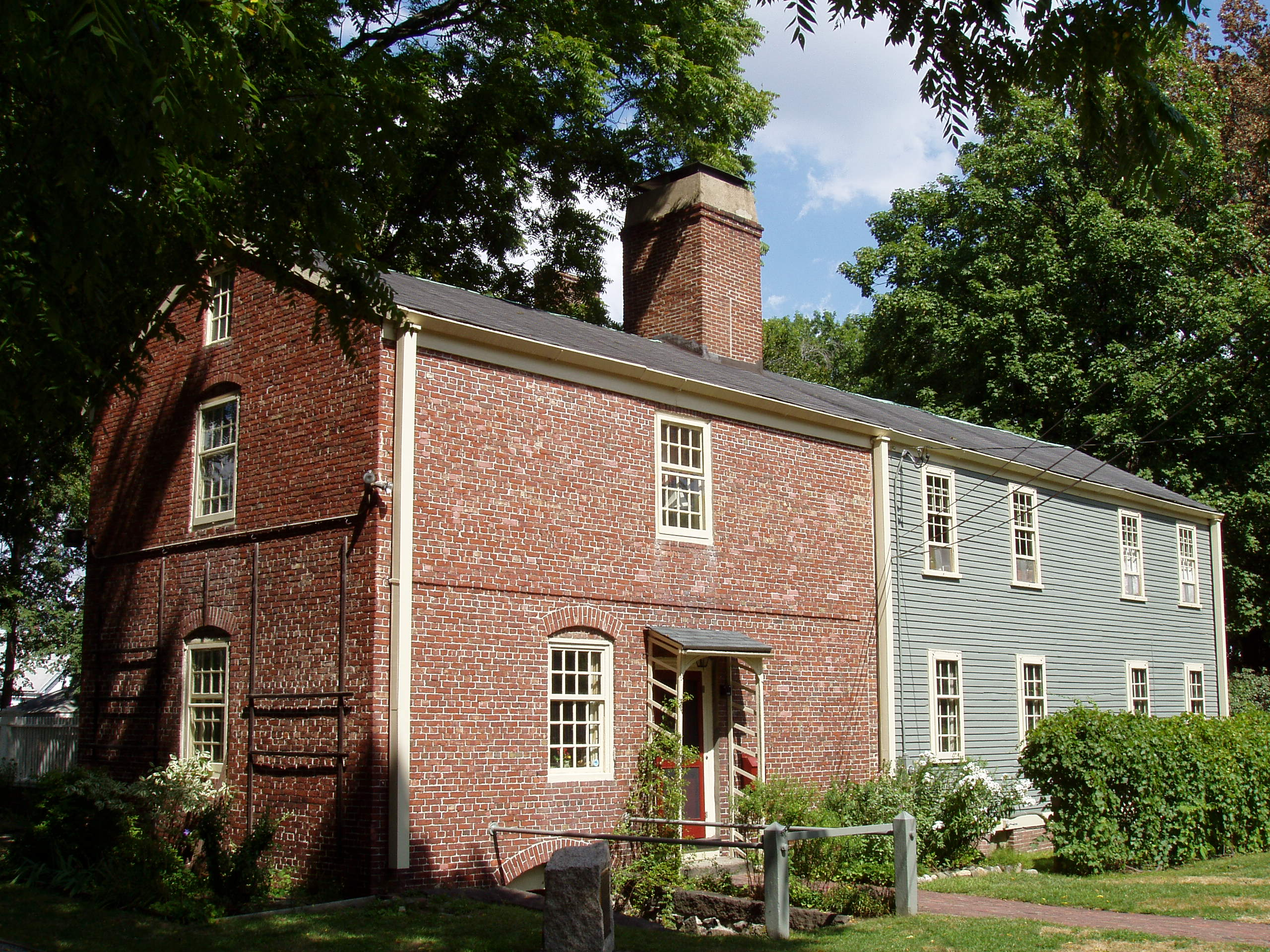
Isaac Royall House, Medford, Massachusetts - Slave quarters

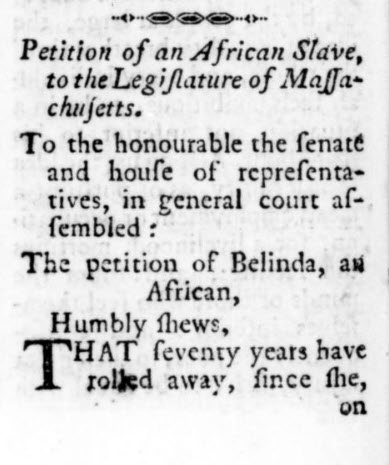
Belinda's petition reprinted in The American Museum, 1787

Belinda Sutton (born c. 1713 in the western part of the African continent), also known as Belinda Royall, was a woman born in what is now Ghana who was enslaved by the Royall family at the Royall House and Slave Quarters in Medford, Massachusetts, USA. Additional details of Sutton's family life are under ongoing research. Baptism records for a son Joseph, and a daughter Prine, appear in church records. Belinda was abandoned by Isaac Royall Jr. when he fled to Nova Scotia at the beginning of the American Revolution. In Royall's will, a number of enslaved people are listed, but Belinda was unique in his wishes:

"In his will he gave his slave Belinda the option of freedom, and he further 'provided that she get security that she shall not be a charge in the town of Medford.' If she did not elect freedom, he bequeathed her to his daughter Mary Erving. Other slaves were bequeathed and some were sold, but Belinda was emancipated."

In February 1783, Sutton presented a petition to the Massachusetts General Court requesting a pension from the proceeds of her enslaver's estate. The vivid petition text was crafted to describe Belinda's kidnapping in Africa and subsequent hardships and to condemn the practice of slavery. Some scholars suggest that she was assisted by Prince Hall, a local free African-American anti-slavery activist of the Revolutionary War era. Other scholars point to the wider Black community and the collective knowledge of prior legal cases in the Commonwealth. The first petition request suggests that Sutton was the major supporter of her daughter:

"she prays, that such allowance may be made her out of the Estate of Colonel Royall, as will prevent her, and her more infirm daughter, from misery in the greatest extreme, and scatter comfort over the short and downward path of their lives"

As a result of this petition, an annual pension of fifteen pounds and twelve shillings was awarded to her, and approved by John Hancock. This pension has been cited as one of the first cases of reparation for slavery and the slave trade.

In the 1788 petition, she is referred to as a "widow" and used the last name Sutton.

Subsequent petitions to the Commonwealth of Massachusetts indicate that after two initial payments, the pension payments were not forthcoming. She continued to petition for the back payments until a final filing in 1793. Later legal documents refer to the Royall servants' deaths having transpired, but when and under what circumstances remain unknown at this time.

== Legacy ==
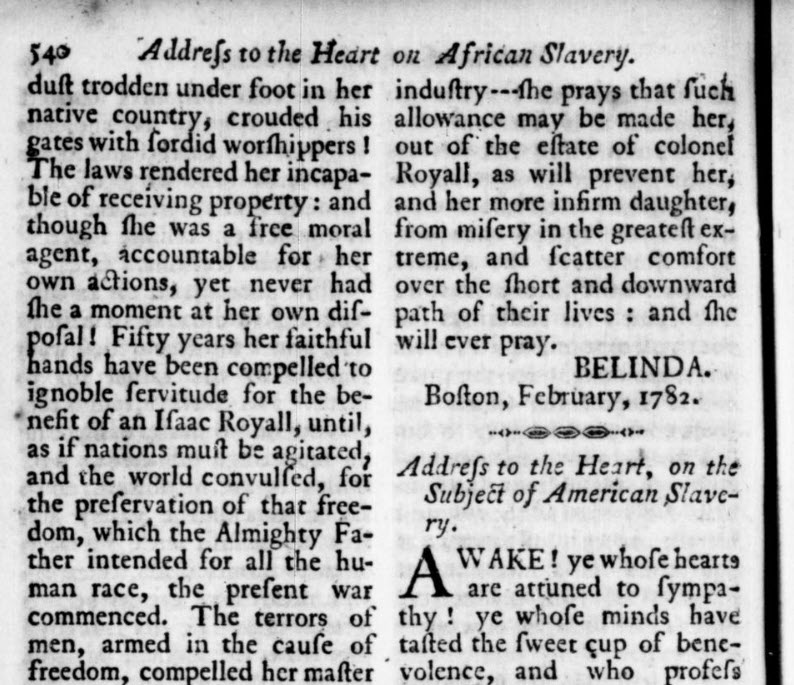
Belinda Sutton's petition reprinted in 1787, indicating her authorship

Belinda's petition was reprinted in 1787 with her authorship credited, by publisher Mathew Carey, accompanied by an anti-slavery essay "Address to the Heart, on the Subject of American Slavery" in the publication The American Museum.

In 1832, William Lloyd Garrison's newspaper The Liberator referenced "Balinda" and her petition in an article called "Capacity of Blacks".

In her 1980 poem "Belinda's Petition," Rita Dove gives voice to a woman first enslaved at age 12: "Lately your Countrymen have severed / the Binds of Tyranny," she says, adding simply, "I would hope you / would consider the Same for me."

Ta-Nehisi Coates' essay "The Case for Reparations" in 2014 called back to Belinda's story and petition.

"Belinda (Say Her Name)", a call and response poem by Kiah Duggans, was inspired by Belinda Sutton's life and lived experiences, and by the #SayHerName movement.

Calls for reparation continue to cite Belinda's story of success, and activists continue to be inspired by her petition:

Unbeknownst to her, Sutton and her petition (which can be read in full at the end of this article) would set the stage for a centuries-long movement to repair the harms of the trans-Atlantic slave trade and chattel slavery. She also helped those who came after her envision what justice and equity in a post-slavery world could look like.

In 2022, Harvard Law School inaugurated a Belinda Sutton Distinguished Lecture series and conferences honoring the work of Belinda Sutton and other enslaved people that contributed to Harvard University's establishment. The series is organized by Guy-Uriel E. Charles, director of the Charles Hamilton Houston Institute for Race and Justice. The first lecture was delivered by Professor Martha S. Jones, entitled "What's So Hard about Hard Histories?" Harvard Law School has also agreed to provide support for the Isaac Royall House and Slave Quarters and collaborate on research and education programs.

A Black History Month program in 2023, with a theme of Black Resistance, celebrated Sutton's legacy. "Remembering Belinda Sutton: Resistance, Activism, and Reparations" at the Royall House and Slave Quarters consisting of a discussion of the 1783 petition, a musical performance, and a discussion of "Belinda Sutton and Black Women's Radical Activism in 18th Century Massachusetts".
