= Medford, Massachusetts =

City in Massachusetts, United States

- City
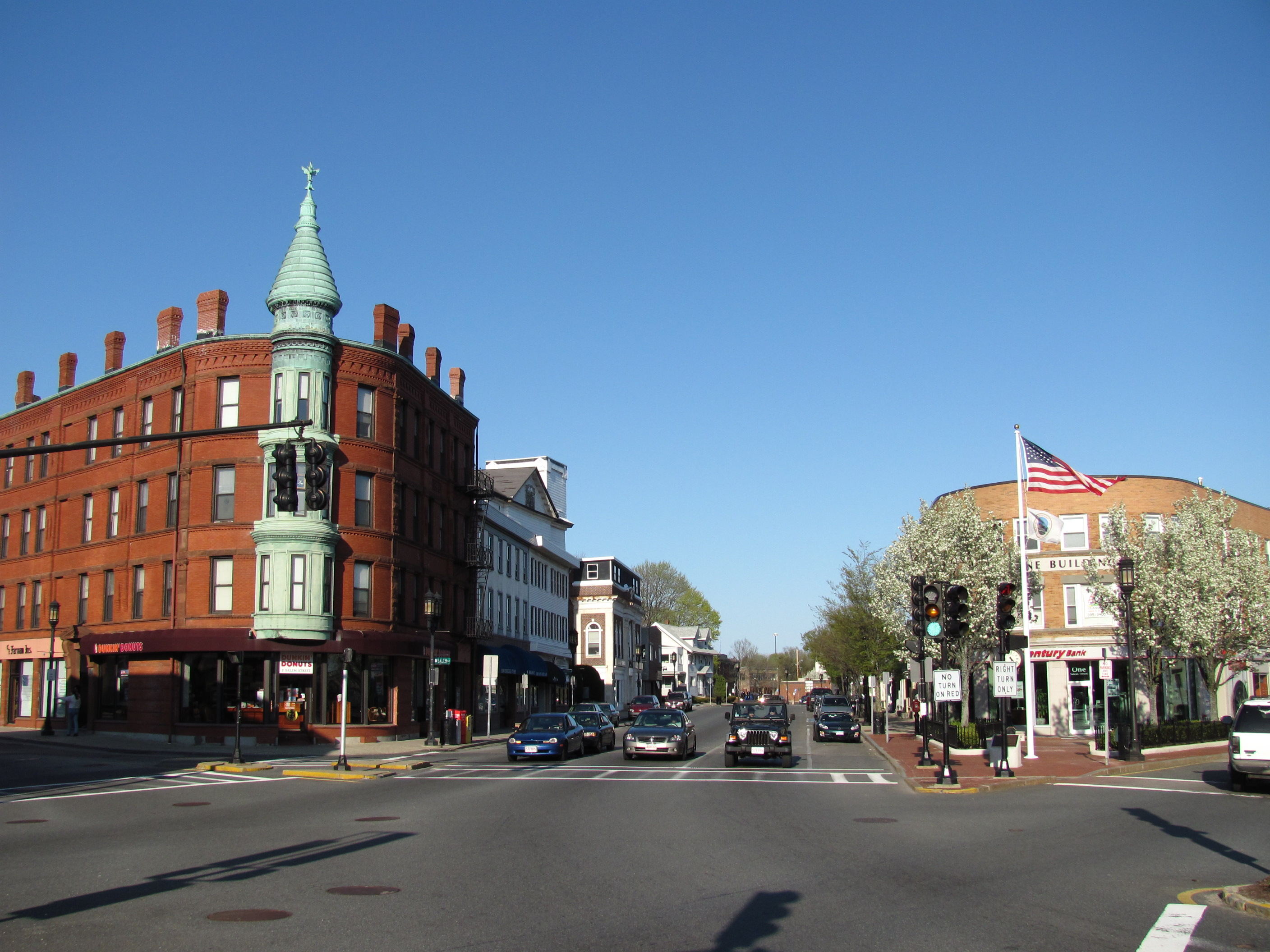
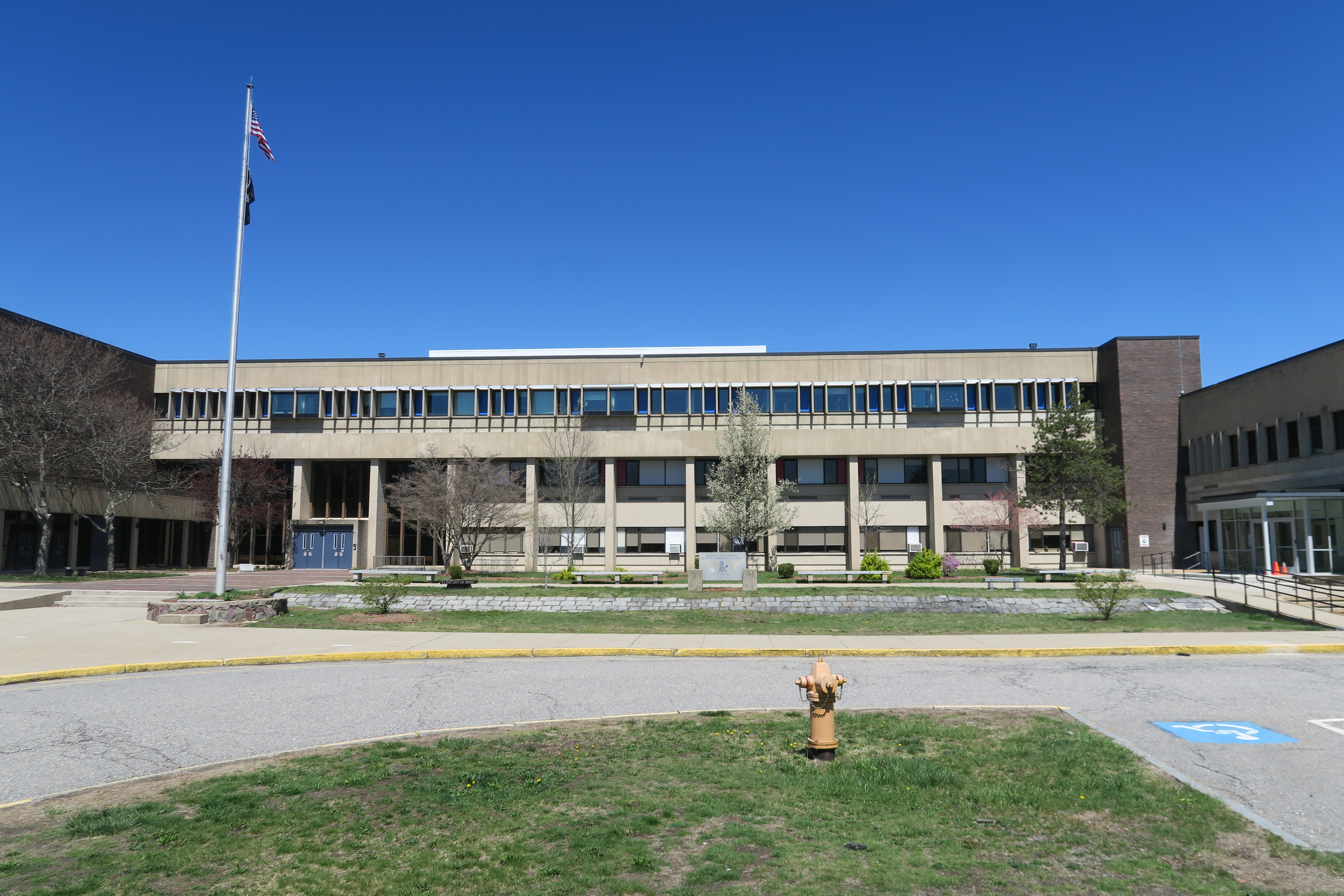
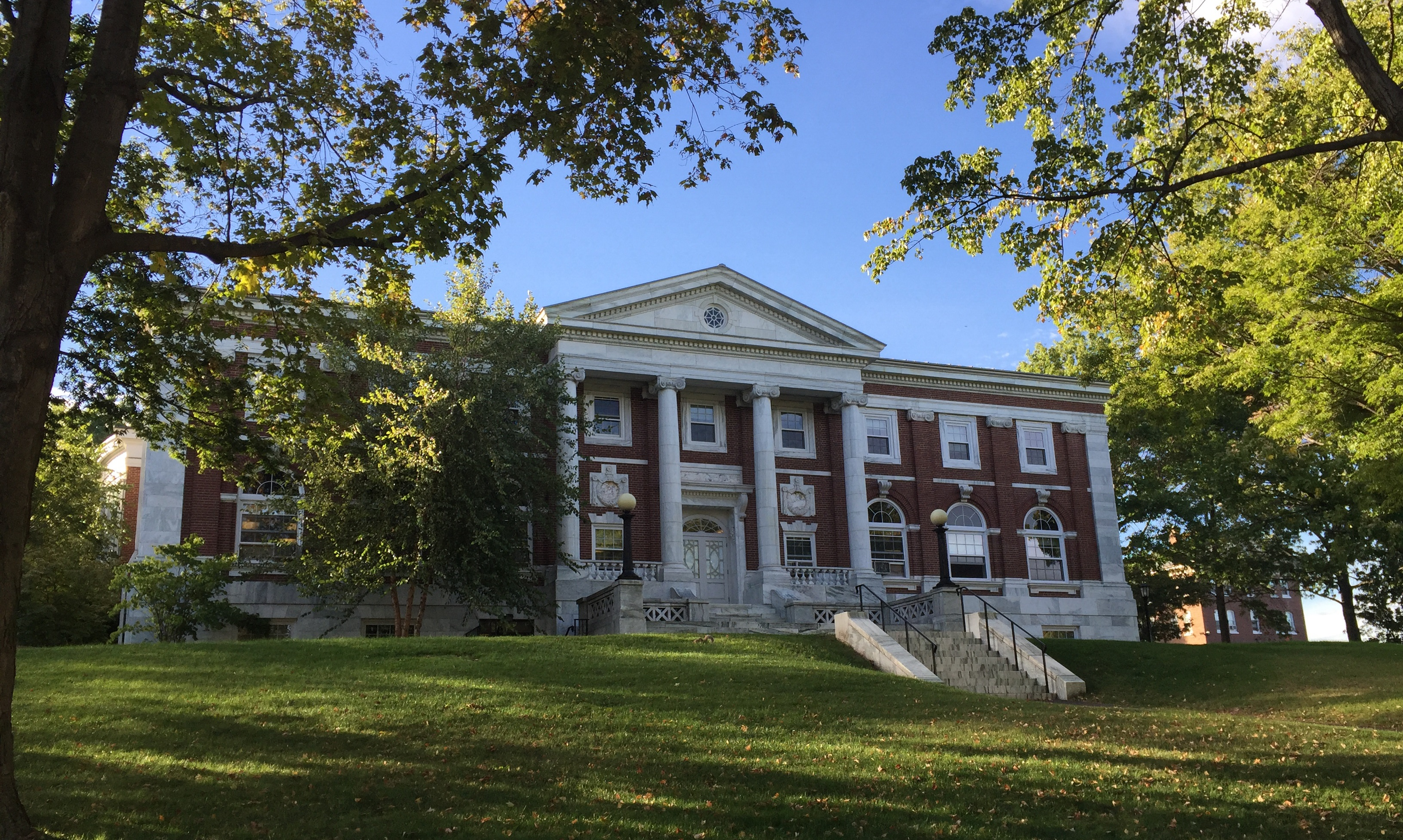
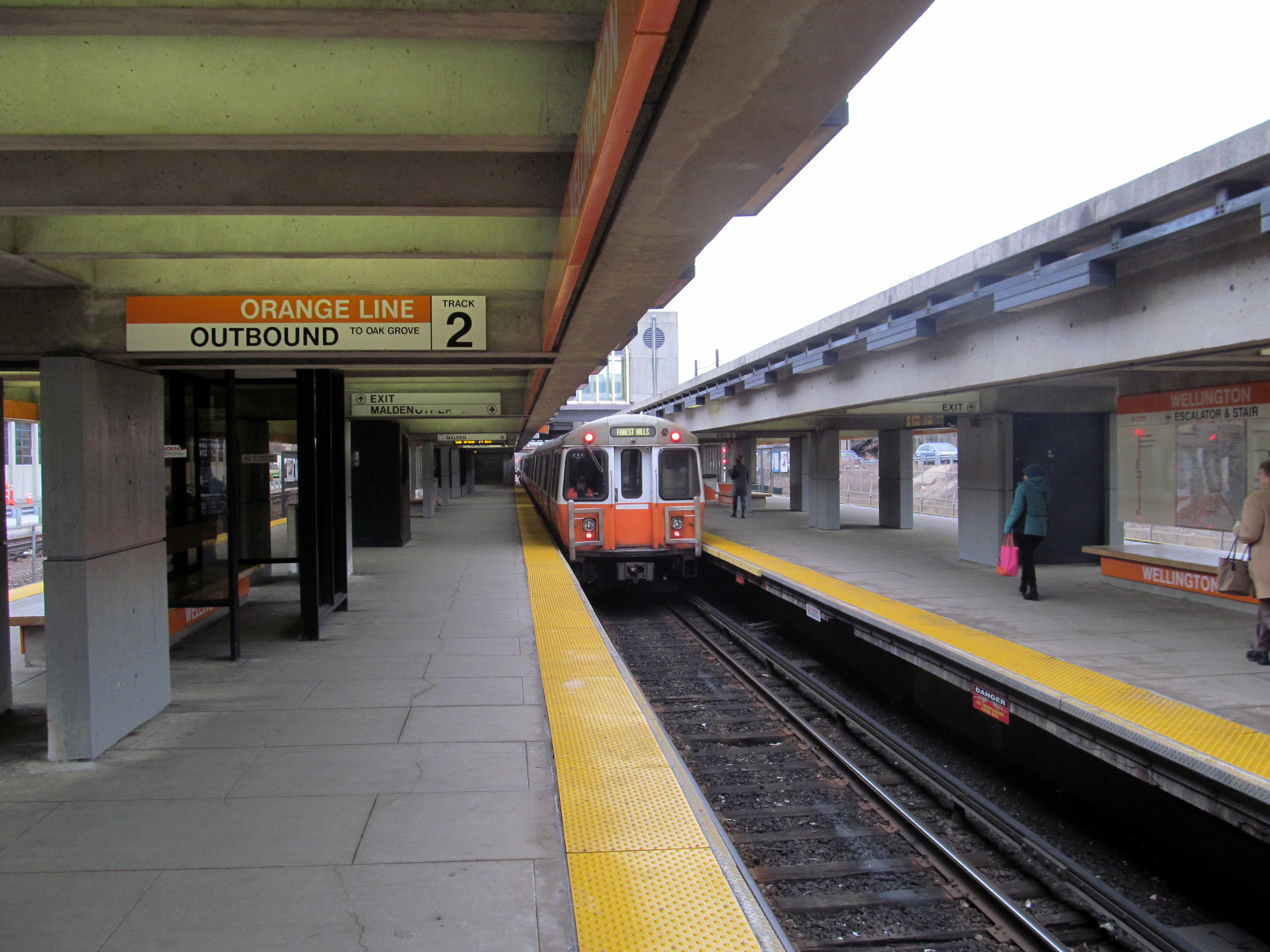
- Left-right from top: Medford Square, Medford High School, Eaton Hall of Tufts University, Wellington MBTA station

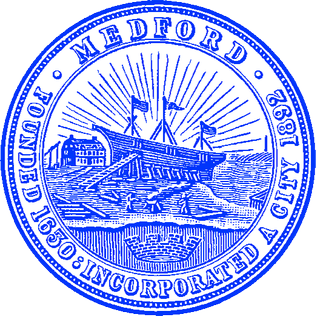
- Seal

- Location in Middlesex County in Massachusetts

- Location in the United States
- Coordinates: 42°25′06″N 71°06′24″W
- Country: United States
- State: Massachusetts
- County: Middlesex
- Region: New England
- Settled: 1630
- Incorporated: 1630
- City: 1892

Government
  - Type: Mayor-council city
  - Mayor: Breanna Lungo-Koehn

Area
  - Total: 8.66 sq mi (22.43 km^{2})
  - Land: 8.10 sq mi (20.98 km^{2})
  - Water: 0.56 sq mi (1.45 km^{2})
- Elevation: 13 ft (4 m)

Population (2020)
  - Total: 59,659
  - Density: 7,366.3/sq mi (2,844.14/km^{2})
- Time zone: UTC−5 (Eastern)
  - Summer (DST): UTC−4 (Eastern)
- ZIP Codes: 02153, 02155–02156
- Area code: 781/339
- FIPS code: 25-39835
- GNIS feature ID: 0612778
- Website: https://www.medfordma.org/

Medford is a city in Middlesex County, Massachusetts, United States. At the time of the 2020 United States census, Medford's population was 59,659. It is home to Tufts University, which has its campus on both sides of the Medford and Somerville border.

== History ==
=== Indigenous history ===
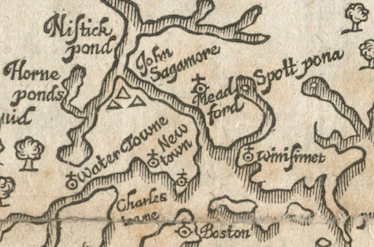
Detail of William Wood's 1634 map of New England, showing Naumkeag sachem Wonohaquaham, known by English colonists as Sagamore John, in Medford

Native Americans inhabited the area that would become Medford for thousands of years prior to European colonization of the Americas. At the time of European contact and exploration, Medford was the winter home of the Naumkeag people, who farmed corn and created fishing weirs at multiple sites along the Mystic River. Naumkeag sachem Nanepashemet was killed and buried at his fortification in present-day Medford during a war with the Tarrantines in 1619. The contact period introduced several European infectious diseases which would decimate native populations in virgin soil epidemics, including a smallpox epidemic which in 1633 killed Nanepashemet's sons, sachems Montowompate and Wonohaquaham. Sagamore Park in West Medford is a native burial site from the contact period, which includes the remains of a likely sachem, either Nanepashemet or Wonohaquaham. After the 1633 epidemic, Nanepashemet's widow, known only as the Squaw Sachem of Mistick, led the Naumkeag, and over the next two decades would deed large parts of Naumkeag territory to English settlers. In 1639, the Massachusetts General Court purchased the land that would become present-day West Medford, then within the boundaries of Charlestown, from the Squaw Sachem.

=== 17th century ===
Medford was settled in 1630 by English colonists as part of Charlestown, of the Massachusetts Bay Colony. The settlement was originally called "Mistick" by Thomas Dudley, based on the Massachusett name for the area's river. Thomas Dudley's party renamed the settlement "Meadford". The name may have come from a description of the "meadow by the ford" in the Mystic River, or from two locations in England that Cradock may have known: the hamlet of Mayford or Metford in Staffordshire near Caverswall, or from the parish of Maidford or Medford (now Towcester, Northamptonshire). In 1634, the land north of the Mystic River was developed as the private plantation of Matthew Cradock, a former governor. Across the river was Ten Hills Farm, which belonged to John Winthrop, Governor of the Massachusetts Bay colony.

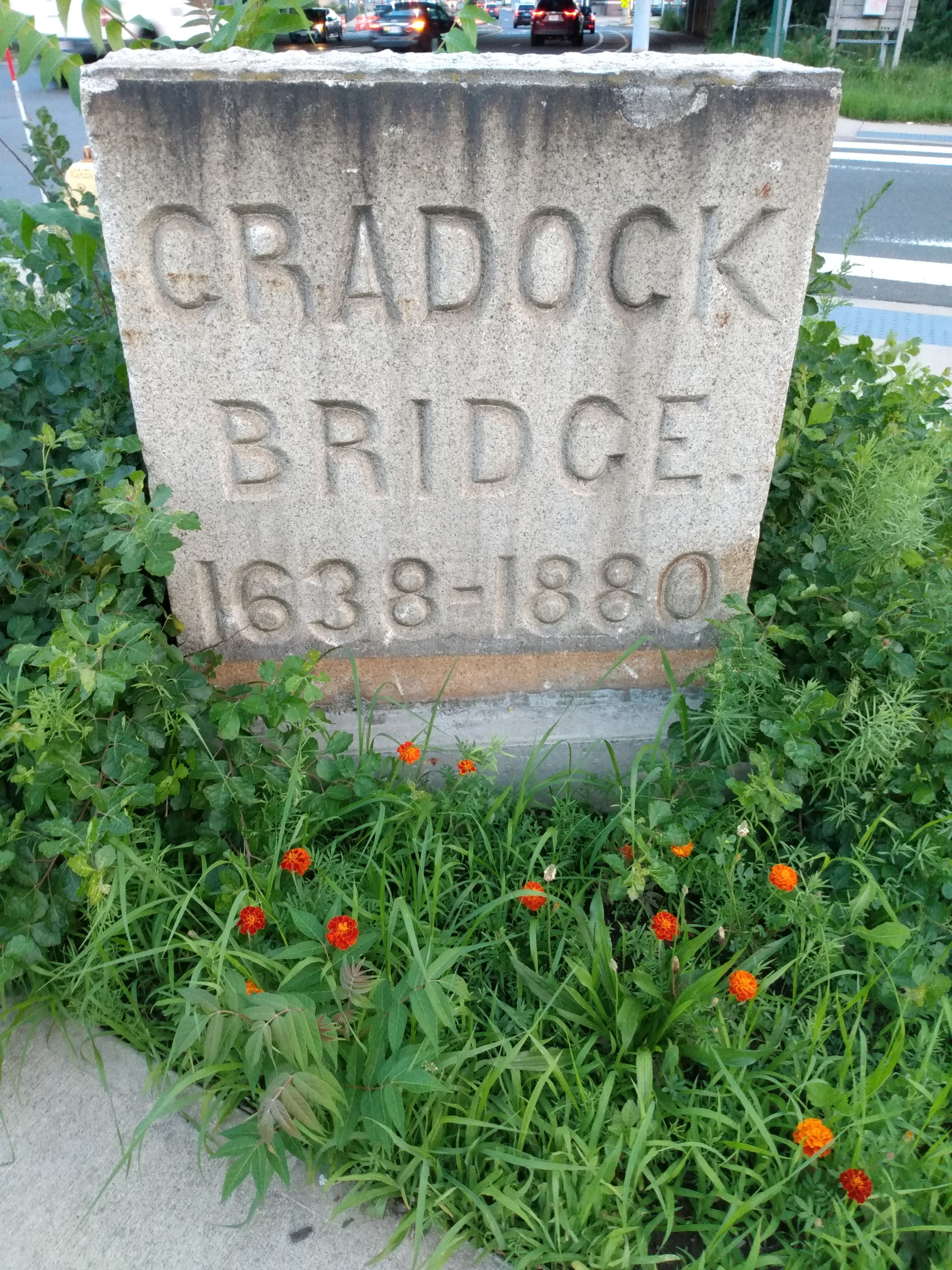
A stone with the dates of the early Cradock Bridge in Medford

In 1637, the first bridge (a toll bridge) across the Mystic River was built at the site of the present-day Cradock Bridge, which carries Main Street into Medford Square. It would be the only bridge across the Mystic until 1787, and as such became a major route for traffic coming into Boston from the north (though ferries and fords were also used). The bridge would be rebuilt in 1880, 1909, and 2018.

Until 1656, all of northern Medford was owned by Cradock, his heirs, or Edward Collins. Medford was governed as a "peculiar" or private plantation. As the land began to be divided among several people from different families, the new owners began to meet and make decisions locally and increasingly independently from the Charlestown town meeting. In 1674, a Board of Selectmen was elected; in 1684, the colonial legislature granted the ability to raise money independently; and in 1689, a representative to the legislature was chosen. The town got its religious meeting room in 1690 and a secular meeting house in 1696.

In 1692, the town engaged its first ordained preacher, Rev. John Hancock Sr. During his time of service, Rev. Hancock lived in Medford, serving until November 1693. One of his grandsons was John Hancock, who was a later notable figure of the American Revolutionary War and later elected as first and third governor of Massachusetts.

=== 18th and 19th centuries ===
The land south of the Mystic River, present-day South Medford, was originally known as "Mistick Field". It was transferred from Charlestown to Medford in 1754. This grant also included the "Charlestown woodlots" (the Medford part of the Middlesex Fells), and part of what was at the time Woburn (now Winchester). Other parts of Medford were transferred from Charlestown in 1811, Winchester in 1850 ("Upper Medford"), and Malden in 1879. Additional land was transferred to Medford from Malden (1817), Everett (1875), and Malden (1877) again.

The population of Medford rose from 230 in 1700 to 1,114 in 1800. After 1880, the population rapidly expanded, reaching 18,244 by 1900. Farmland was divided into lots and sold to build residential and commercial buildings, starting in the 1840s and 1850s; government services expanded with the population (schools, police, post office) and technological advancement (gas lighting, electricity, telephones, railways). Tufts University was chartered in 1852 and the Crane Theological School at Tufts opened in 1869. In 1865, the Lawrence Rifles volunteer militia company was formed in Medford during the Civil War.

Medford was incorporated as a city in 1892, and was a center of industry, including the manufacture of tiles and crackers, bricks, rum, and clipper ships, such as the White Swallow and the Kingfisher, both built by Hayden & Cudworth.

=== Transportation ===
During the 17th century, a handful of major public roads (High Street, Main Street, Salem Street, "the road to Stoneham", and South Street) served the population, but the road network started a long-term expansion in the 18th century. The Medford Turnpike Company was incorporated in 1803 and (as was reasonably common at the time) turned what is now Mystic Avenue over to the city in 1866. The Andover Turnpike Company was incorporated in 1805 and turned what is now Forest Street and Fellsway West over to Medford in 1830.

Other major commercial transportation projects included the Middlesex Canal by 1803, the Boston and Lowell Railroad in West Medford in the 1830s, and the Boston and Maine Railroad to Medford Center in 1847.

A horse-powered street railway began running to Somerville and Charlestown in 1860. The street railway network expanded in the hands of various private companies and went electric in the late 1890s when trolleys to Everett and downtown Boston were available. Streetcars were converted to buses in the 20th century. Interstate 93 was constructed between 1956 and 1963.

=== Spongy moth ===
In 1868, a French astronomer and naturalist, Leopold Trouvelot, was attempting to breed a better silkworm using spongy moths which are native to Asia and Europe. Several moths escaped from his home at 27 Myrtle Street. Within ten years, the insect had denuded the vegetation in the neighborhood. It spread over North America.

=== Holiday songs ===
In Simpson's Tavern, a tavern and boarding house on High Street, in the late 19th century, resident James Pierpont is rumored to have written "Jingle Bells" after watching a sleigh race from Medford to Malden. There is also a claim that Pierpont wrote it while he was the music director at Unitarian Universalist Church in Savannah, Georgia. He copyrighted the song while there.

Another resident, Lydia Maria Child (1802–1880), made a poem out of the trip across town to her grandparents' house, now the song "Over the River and Through the Wood".

=== Other notables ===
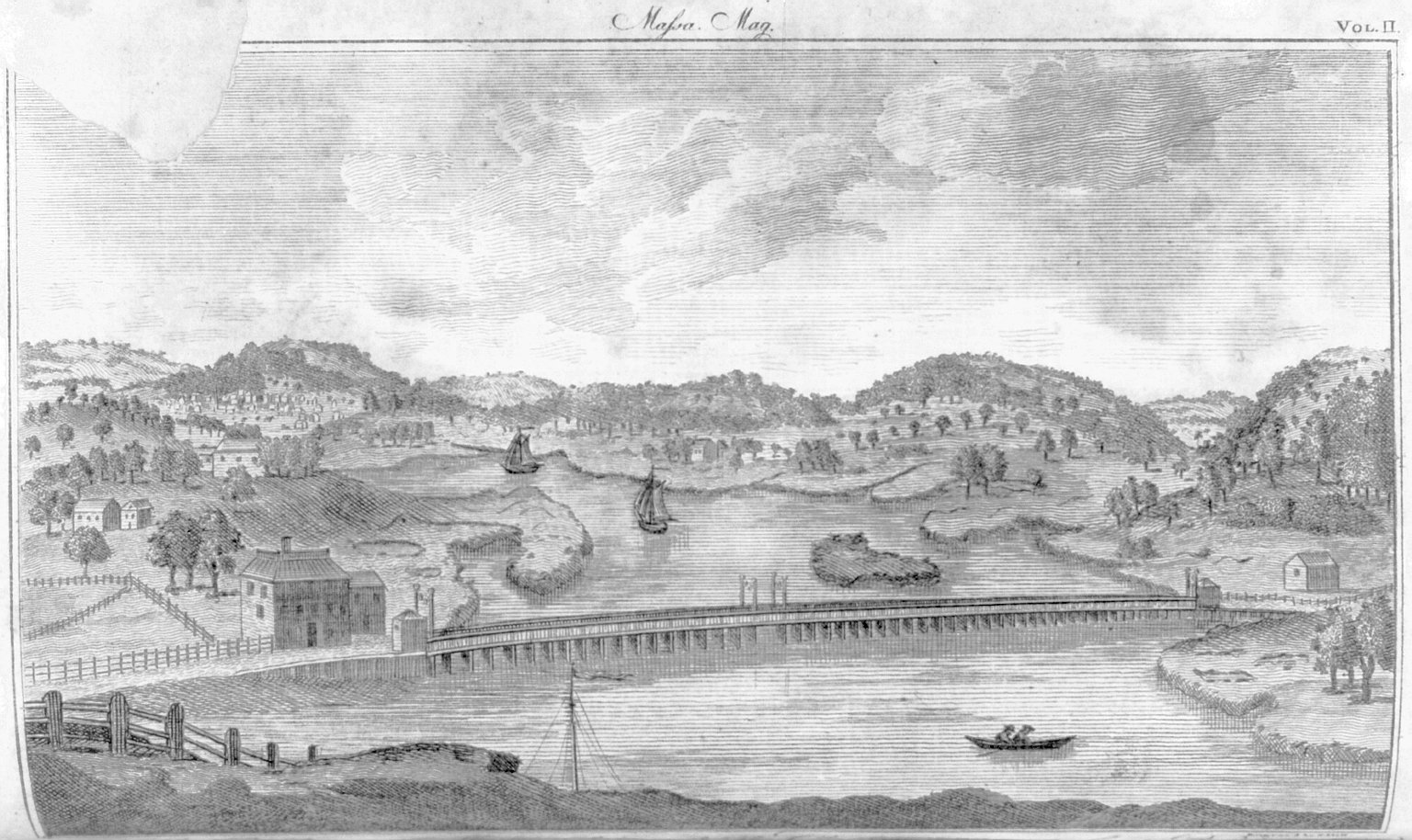
1790 bird's-eye view from Bunker Hill of the "Malden Bridge" across the Mystic River, with Medford in the background

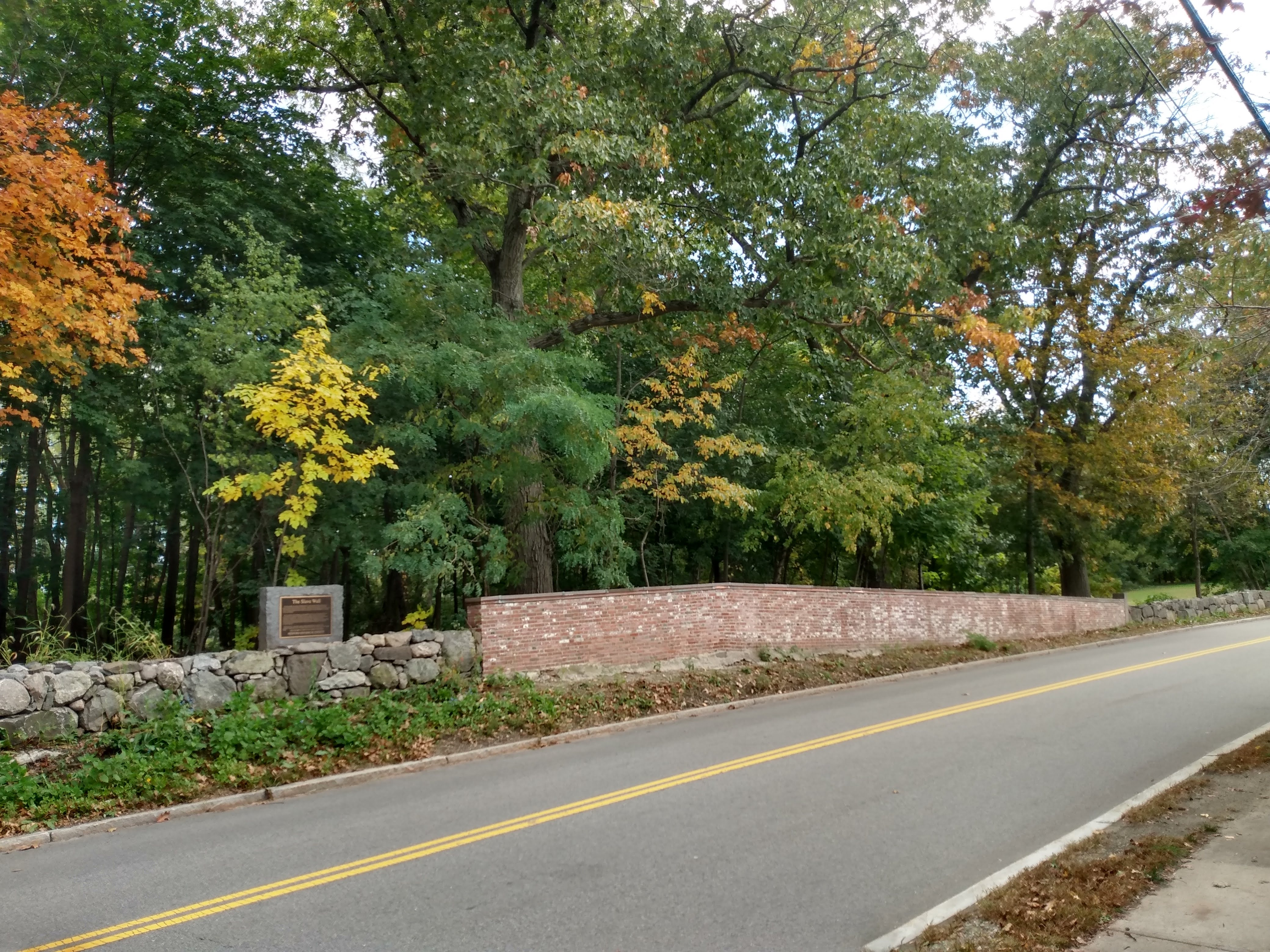
Pomp's Wall and Historical Marker

Paul Revere's famous midnight ride traveled along Main Street and continued onto High Street in Medford Square. An annual re-enactment honors the historic event.

The Peter Tufts House (350 Riverside Ave.) is thought to be the oldest all-brick building in New England. Another important site is the "Slave Wall" on Grove Street, built by "Pomp", an enslaved person owned by the prominent Brooks family. The Royall House and Slave Quarters, which once belonged to one of Harvard Law School's founders, Isaac Royall, Jr., is a National Historic Landmark and a local history museum. The house was used by Continental Army troops, including George Washington and John Stark, during the American Revolutionary War.

George Luther Stearns, an American industrialist and one of John Brown's Secret Six. His passion for the abolitionist cause shaped his life, bringing him into contact with the likes of Abraham Lincoln and Ralph Waldo Emerson and starting The Nation magazine. He was given the rank of major by Massachusetts Governor John Andrew and spent most of the Civil War recruiting for the 54th and 55th Massachusetts regiments and the 5th Cavalry.

Medford was home to Fannie Farmer, author of one of the world's most famous cookbooks.

Amelia Earhart lived in Medford while working as a social worker in 1925.

Elizabeth Short, the victim of an infamous Hollywood murder and who became known as The Black Dahlia, was born in Hyde Park (the southernmost neighborhood of the city of Boston, Massachusetts) but raised in Medford before going to the West Coast looking for fame.

Medford has sent more than its share of athletes to the National Hockey League; Shawn Bates, though born in Melrose, grew up in Medford, as did Keith Tkachuk, Mike Morrison, David Sacco and Joe Sacco. Former Red Sox pitcher Bill Monbouquette grew up in Medford, as did former Major League Baseball infielder Mike Pagliarulo.

Medford was home to Michael Bloomberg, American businessman, philanthropist, and the founder of Bloomberg L.P. He was the mayor of New York City from 2002 to 2013. Mayor Bloomberg attended Medford High School and resided in Medford until after he graduated from college at Johns Hopkins University. His mother remained a resident of Medford until her death in 2011.

The only cryobank of amniotic stem cells in the United States is located in Medford, built by Biocell Center, a biotechnology company led by Giuseppe Simoni.

Meadow Glen Mall, an enclosed shopping mall in Medford, closed on February 1, 2016, as the property was prepared for redevelopment into a retail plaza.

=== Notable crimes ===
- One of the biggest bank robberies and jewel heists in world history happened on Memorial Day weekend in 1980, when several officers of the Medford Police and Metropolitan District Commission Police forces robbed the Depositors Trust Bank in Medford Square, yielding an estimated $25 million. The book The Cops Are Robbers: A Convicted Cop's True Story of Police Corruption is based upon this event. Salvatore's Restaurant, later known as "The Vault", was located at 55 High Street in Medford Square, in partially in the same location as the bank that was robbed. The private dining room in the restaurant used the bank's vault door as an entrance way, and the hole in the corner of the ceiling that the robbers crawled through was left intact for nostalgia. The restaurant is now closed, a Chase Bank location taking its place.
- An admitted Mob execution by Somerville's Winter Hill Gang of Joe "Indian-Joe" Notarangeli took place on April 19, 1973, at the "Pewter Pot" café in Medford Square, now called the "Lighthouse Cafe."
- In October 1989, the FBI recorded a Mafia initiation ceremony held by the Patriarca crime family at a home on Guild St. in Medford.

== Geography ==
Medford is located at 42°25′12″N 71°6′29″W (42.419996, −71.107942).

According to the United States Census Bureau, the city has a total area of 8.6 square miles (22 km^{2}), of which 8.1 square miles (21 km^{2}) is land and 0.5 square miles (1.3 km^{2}) (5.79%) is water.

A park called the Middlesex Fells Reservation, to the north, lies partly within the city. This 2,060-acre (8 km^{2}) preserve is shared by Medford with the municipalities of Winchester, Stoneham, Melrose, and Malden. The Mystic River flows roughly west to southeast through the middle of the city.

=== Neighborhoods ===
People from Medford often identify themselves with a particular neighborhood.

- West Medford
  - Brooks Estates
- Fulton Heights/The Heights (North Medford)
- Wellington (East Medford)
- Glenwood
- Lawrence Estates
- South Medford
- Medford Hillside
  - Tufts University (mostly contiguous, situated on Medford Hillside)

== Demographics ==
Historical population
| Year | Pop. | ±% |
|---|---|---|
| 1790 | 1,029 | — |
| 1800 | 1,114 | +8.3% |
| 1810 | 1,443 | +29.5% |
| 1820 | 1,474 | +2.1% |
| 1830 | 1,755 | +19.1% |
| 1840 | 2,478 | +41.2% |
| 1850 | 3,749 | +51.3% |
| 1860 | 4,842 | +29.2% |
| 1870 | 5,717 | +18.1% |
| 1880 | 7,573 | +32.5% |
| 1890 | 11,079 | +46.3% |
| 1900 | 18,244 | +64.7% |
| 1910 | 23,150 | +26.9% |
| 1920 | 39,038 | +68.6% |
| 1930 | 59,714 | +53.0% |
| 1940 | 63,083 | +5.6% |
| 1950 | 66,113 | +4.8% |
| 1960 | 64,971 | −1.7% |
| 1970 | 64,397 | −0.9% |
| 1980 | 58,076 | −9.8% |
| 1990 | 57,407 | −1.2% |
| 2000 | 55,765 | −2.9% |
| 2010 | 56,173 | +0.7% |
| 2020 | 59,659 | +6.2% |
| 2024* | 59,898 | +0.4% |
* = population estimate. Source: United States census records and Population Estimates Program data. Source: U.S. Decennial Census

=== 2020 census ===
As of the 2020 census, Medford had a population of 59,659. The median age was 35.6 years. 14.1% of residents were under the age of 18 and 15.9% of residents were 65 years of age or older. For every 100 females there were 94.0 males, and for every 100 females age 18 and over there were 92.3 males age 18 and over.

100.0% of residents lived in urban areas, while 0.0% lived in rural areas.

There were 24,413 households in Medford, of which 21.3% had children under the age of 18 living in them. Of all households, 40.2% were married-couple households, 20.7% were households with a male householder and no spouse or partner present, and 30.6% were households with a female householder and no spouse or partner present. About 28.5% of all households were made up of individuals and 11.0% had someone living alone who was 65 years of age or older.

There were 25,770 housing units, of which 5.3% were vacant. The homeowner vacancy rate was 0.8% and the rental vacancy rate was 5.0%.

Racial composition as of the 2020 census
| Race | Number | Percent |
|---|---|---|
| White | 40,474 | 67.8% |
| Black or African American | 4,977 | 8.3% |
| American Indian and Alaska Native | 77 | 0.1% |
| Asian | 6,839 | 11.5% |
| Native Hawaiian and Other Pacific Islander | 21 | 0.0% |
| Some other race | 2,327 | 3.9% |
| Two or more races | 4,944 | 8.3% |
| Hispanic or Latino (of any race) | 3,705 | 6.2% |

=== 2010 census ===
As of the census of 2010, there were 56,173 people, 22,810 households, and 13,207 families residing in the city. The population density was 6,859.9 inhabitants per square mile (2,648.6/km^{2}). There were 24,046 housing units at an average density of 2,796.0 per square mile (1,079.5/km^{2}). The racial makeup of the city was 78.6% White, 8.80% African American, 0.2% Native American, 6.9% Asian, 0.01% Pacific Islander, 2.8% from other races, and 2.7% from two or more races. Hispanic or Latino of any race were 4.4% of the population.

There were 22,810 households, of which 22.3% had children under 18 living with them, 42.5% were married couples living together, 11.4% had a female householder with no husband present, and 42.1% were non-families. 24.6% of all households were made up of individuals, and 11.1% had someone living alone who was 65 years of age or older. The average household size was 2.38 and the average family size was 3.00.

The population was spread out in the city, with 13.8% under the age of 15, 14.3% from 15 to 24, 31.7% from 25 to 44, 24.9% from 45 to 64, and 15.2% who were 65 or older. The median age was 37.7 years. For every 100 females, there were 91.5 males. For every 100 females age 18 and over, there were 89.4 males.

=== Ancestry and neighborhoods ===
Irish Americans have a strong presence in the city and live in all areas. South Medford is a traditionally Italian neighborhood. West Medford, the most affluent of Medford's many neighborhoods, was once the bastion of some of Boston's elite families—including Peter Chardon Brooks, one of the wealthiest men in post-colonial America and father-in-law to Charles Francis Adams—and is also home to a historic African-American neighborhood that dates to the Civil War.

=== Population estimates ===
Between 2021 and 2022, the United States Census Bureau ranked Medford as having one of the nation's fastest-growing populations.

=== Income ===
The median income for a household in the city was $52,476, and the median income for a family was $62,409. Males had a median income of $41,704 versus $34,948 for females. The per capita income for the city was $24,707. About 4.1% of families and 6.4% of the population were below the poverty line, including 5.7% of those under age 18 and 7.4% of those age 65 or over.

=== Media ===
Medford has three Public, educational, and government access (PEG) cable TV channels. The Public-access television channel is TV3, The Educational-access television is channel 15, and 16 is the Government-access television (GATV) municipal channel.

== Education ==
Medford is home to many schools, public and private.

Elementary

Public

- Missituk Elementary School
- Brooks Elementary School
- John J. McGlynn Elementary School
- Milton Fuller Roberts Elementary School

Private (non-sectarian)

- Eliot-Pearson Children's School (Pre-K–2)
- Gentle-Dragon Preschool (Pre-K)
- Merry-Go-Round Nursery School (Pre-K)
- Play Academy Learning Center (Pre-K–K)
- Oakland Park Children's Center (Pre-K)
- Six Acres Nursery School (Pre-K–K) (non-sectarian, but run through Medford Jewish Community Center)

Private (sectarian)

- St. Joseph's (K–8)
- St. Raphael's (Pre-K–8)

Middle School

- John J. McGlynn Middle School
- Madeline Dugger Andrews Middle School

High school

Public

- Medford High School
- Medford Vocational Technical High School
  - Mascot: Mustang

College

Private

- Tufts University

Miscellaneous education

Private

- The Greater Boston Japanese Language School (ボストン補習授業校, Bosuton Hoshū Jugyō Kō), a supplementary school for Japanese people, holds classes at Medford High. Its weekday offices are in Arlington.

== Government ==
County government: Middlesex County
| Clerk of Courts: | Michael A. Sullivan |
| District attorney: | Marian Ryan |
| Register of Deeds: | Richard P. Howe, Jr. (North at Lowell); Eugene C. Brune (South at Cambridge) |
| Register of Probate: | Tara E. DeCristofaro |
| County Sheriff: | Peter Koutoujian (D) |
State government
| State Representative(s): | Paul Donato (D); Sean Garballey (D); Christine Barber (D) |
| State Senator(s): | Patricia D. Jehlen (D, 2nd Middlesex district) |
| Governor's Councilor(s): | Terrence W. Kennedy (D) |
Federal government
| U.S. Representative(s): | Katherine Clark (D-5th District) |
| U.S. Senators: | Elizabeth Warren (D), Ed Markey (D) |

Voter registration and party enrollment as of February 1, 2025
| Party | Number of voters | Percentage |
|---|---|---|
| Unenrolled | 25,218 | 59.17% |
| Democratic | 14,912 | 34.99% |
| Republican | 2,147 | 5.04% |
| Other | 346 | 0.81% |
| Total | 42,623 | 100% |

=== Local government ===
- Breanna Lungo-Koehn, Mayor
- Rich Eliseo, Acting City Clerk
- Nina Nazarian, Chief of Staff

City Council

- Isaac B. "Zac" Bears, President
- Emily Lazzaro, Vice President
- Anna Callahan
- Matt Leming
- George A. Scarpelli
- Justin Tseng
- Liz Mullane

School Committee

- Breanna Lungo-Koehn, Chair
- Jenny R. Graham, Vice Chair
- Aaron Olapade
- Erika Reinfeld
- Paul Ruseau, Secretary
- Michael Mastrobuoni
- Jessica Parks

== Local media and news ==
The City of Medford has several local news and media outlets:

=== Print ===
- The Transcript & Journal
- Medford Daily Mercury (1880–2017)
- The Tufts Daily

== Transportation ==
Three MBTA subway stations are located in Medford: Wellington in the Wellington Neighborhood opening in 1975 on the Orange Line, then in 2022 as part of the GLX project the Hillside and South Medford neighborhoods light rail stations, Medford/Tufts and Ball Square on the Green Line opened. The MBTA Commuter Rail Lowell Line stops at West Medford. Medford is served by MBTA bus local routes 80, 94, 95, 96, 99, 100, 101, 108, and 134, plus express route 354.

Interstate 93 travels roughly north–south through the city. State routes passing through Medford include 16, 28, 38, and 60.

== Points of interest ==
- Amelia Earhart residence, 76 Brooks Street
- Former site of Fannie Farmer's house, corner of Paris & Salem Streets
- Grandfather's House
- Grace Church, designed by H. H. Richardson
- Gravity Research Foundation monument at Tufts University
- Henry Bradlee Jr. House
- Jingle Bells historical marker, High Street
- John Wade House, built 1784, added to the National Register of Historic Places in 1975
- Old Ship Street Historic District: Area around Riverside Ave (formerly Ship Street) containing many historic homes
- Royall House and Slave Quarters, the only surviving slave quarters in Massachusetts, a 1692 house operating as a non-profit museum.
- Salem Street Burying Ground
- Tufts University: Though the Tufts campus is mainly located in Medford, the Somerville–Medford border actually runs through it. The school employs many local residents and has many community service projects that serve the city, especially those run through the Leonard Carmichael Society and the Jonathan M. Tisch College of Citizenship and Public Service, the latter of which especially emphasizes public service in Tufts' host communities.
- The Unitarian Universalist Church of Medford: Medford's first religious community, founded in 1690.
- United States Post Office–Medford Main, 1937 historic building
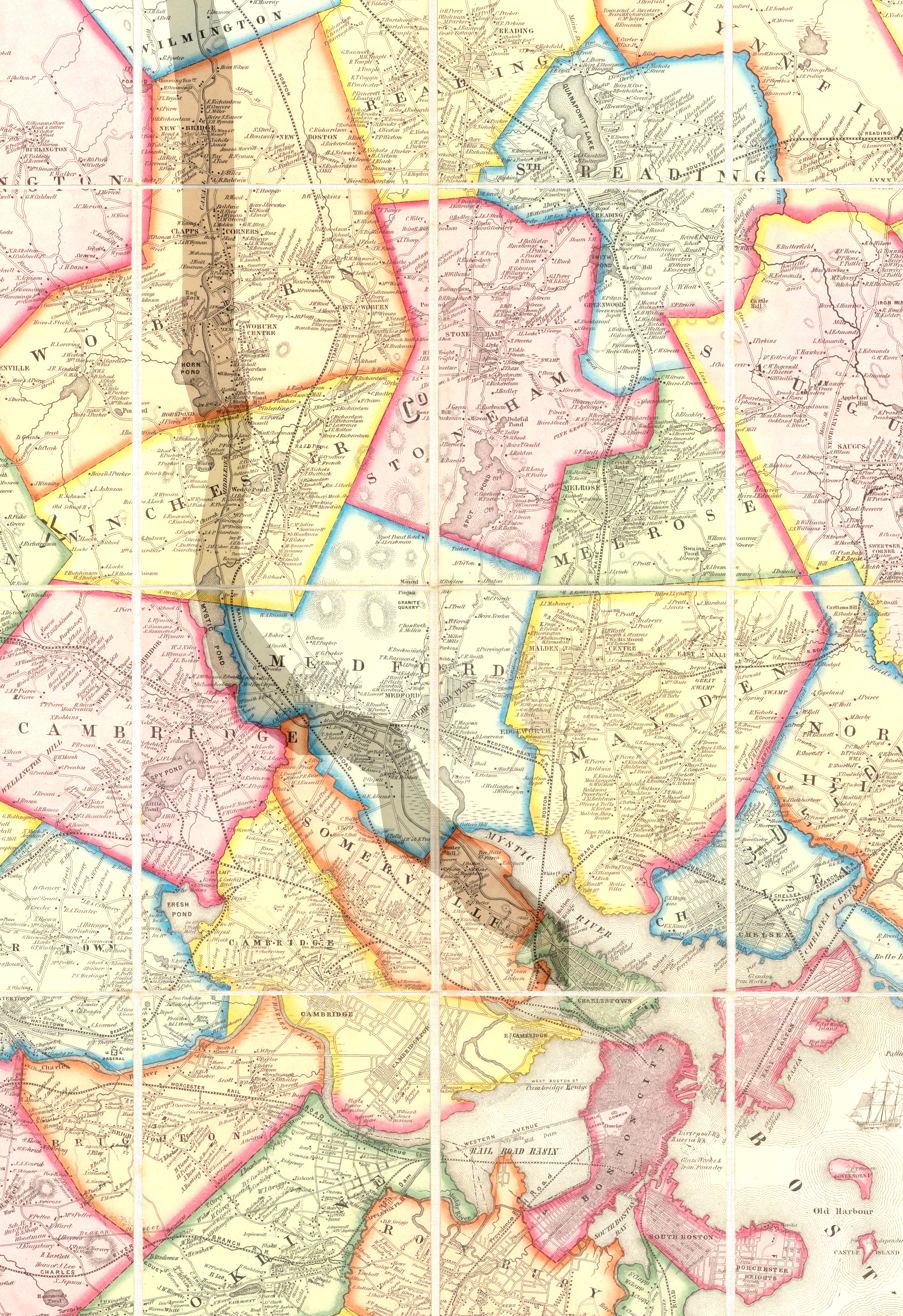
1852 map of Boston area showing Medford and rail lines

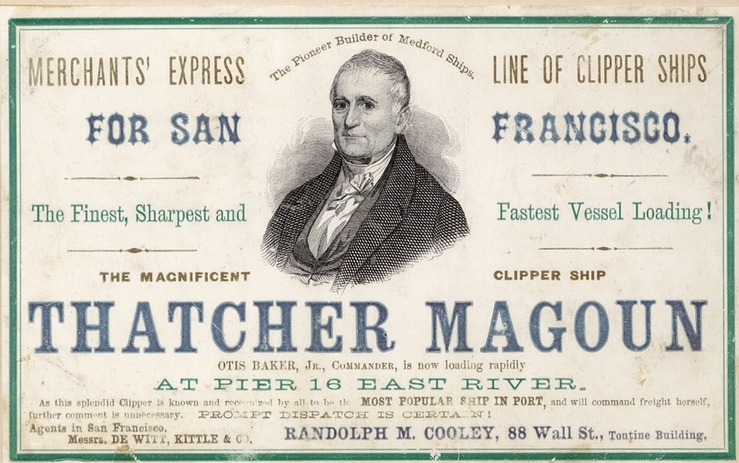
Clipper ship Thatcher Magoun, built in Medford

== Notable people ==
- Edwin Adams (1834–1877), stage comedian of the 19th century
- Lou Antonelli, science fiction writer
- Rev. Hosea Ballou II, Minister of 1st Universalist and first president of Tufts College
- Shawn Bates, professional hockey player, New York Islanders
- Bia, rapper, singer, and model
- Jessica Biel, actress, resident while attending Tufts University
- Heber R. Bishop (1840–1902), industrialist and financier
- Michael Bloomberg, mayor of New York City (2002–2013)
- Dale Bozzio, lead singer of Missing Persons
- Foghorn Bradley, was a baseball player and umpire in Major League Baseball
- Hall L. Brooks, former member of the Wisconsin State Assembly
- Loren Bouchard, animator, musician, filmmaker, creator and showrunner of Bob's Burgers
- Mary Carew, Olympic gold medalist sprinter, born in Medford
- Terri Lyne Carrington, jazz drummer
- John Ciardi, poet and translator of Dante
- Lydia Maria Child, anti-slavery activist, writer of the poem "Over the River and Through the Woods"
- Martha Coakley, former attorney general of Massachusetts
- Joe Coleman, Major League Baseball player
- Bill Cummings, philanthropist, real estate mogul
- James O. Curtis (1804–1890), Medford shipbuilder who built ships powered by sail or by screw and steam
- Thayer David, TV and film character actor
- Edward Dugger (1894–1939), African American military commander
- Amelia Earhart, pioneer aviator, born in Kansas, lived in Medford as a young woman
- Eugene Fama, winner of the Nobel Memorial Prize in Economic Sciences
- Fannie Farmer, culinary expert
- Frank Fontaine, comedian and singer
- Paul Geary, former drummer of hard rock band Extreme, music manager for acts such as Godsmack
- Dana Giacchetto, American stockbroker and financial criminal
- Alan L. Gropman, military officer, college professor, and author
- Colonel Edward Needles Hallowell, merchant and commander of 54th Massachusetts Volunteer Infantry in the American Civil War
- Jonas Hampton, distance runner
- John Hancock Sr., first ordained preacher of Medford, lived and served in Medford 1692–1693, grandfather to John Hancock, Governor of Massachusetts and famous revolutionary figure
- Bill Hanley, audio pioneer, sound engineer, "Father of Festival Sound"
- Robert Kelly, comedian known for Tourgasm
- Thatcher Magoun (1775 – 1856), shipbuilder and trader
- Kathleen McCartney, president of Smith College, former dean of Harvard Graduate School of Education
- Michael McDowell, screenwriter of Beetlejuice and The Nightmare Before Christmas and author of Southern Gothic novels
- Dave McGillivray, race director of Boston Marathon
- Maria Menounos, Miss Massachusetts Teen USA 1996, media personality (Entertainment Tonight, Access Hollywood and Extra), actress, professional wrestler, hostess of the Eurovision Song Contest 2006
- Bill Monbouquette, Major League Baseball pitcher 1958–1968 (Red Sox, Tigers, Yankees)
- Priscilla Morrill, actress, played Edie Grant on the Mary Tyler Moore Show
- John Forbes Nash, Princeton professor, winner of the Nobel Memorial Prize in Economic Sciences
- Julianne Nicholson, actress (Ally McBeal, Law and Order: Criminal Intent, August: Osage County)
- Sean O'Brien, President of the International Brotherhood of Teamsters (2022–Present)
- Alexis Ohanian, founder of Reddit
- Mike Pagliarulo, Major League Baseball player (Yankees, Twins, Padres, Rangers, Orioles)
- Sam Petrucci, Graphic designer, original GI Joe artist
- James Pierpont, writer of "Jingle Bells"
- Rev. John Pierpont
- Charles H. Pizzano noted sculptor
- Ruth Posselt, classical violinist
- Edward Power, actor
- Guy H. Preston, US Army brigadier general
- Robert D. Richardson, historian, grew up in the Osgood House
- William Zebina Ripley, economist and racial theorist
- Mark Roopenian, NFL player
- Isaac Royall, Jr., 18th century benefactor of Harvard, and the largest enslaver in Massachusetts
- David Sacco, NHL player
- Joe Sacco, NHL player and coach
- Claude Shannon, scientist, father of Information Theory and modern digital communications
- Elizabeth Short, aspiring actress, mutilated and murdered, dubbed the "Black Dahlia" by the press
- Clifford Shull, Nobel Prize–winning American physicist
- David Silva, Provost and Academic Vice President at Salem State University, linguistics scholar, essayist.
- Rev. Clarence Skinner, Dean of Religion at Tufts University, minister Hillside Universalist Church (1917–1920), theologian and pacifist
- Ben Sliney, FAA National Operations Manager during the September 11 attacks who ordered closure of U.S. air space
- Bill Staines, folk musician
- George Luther Stearns, industrialist, one of John Brown's Secret Six, lead recruiter of 54th and 55th Regiments
- Caleb Stetson, 19th-century Unitarian minister; pastor of the Unitarian Universalist Church of Medford and the Osgood House
- Mark T. Sullivan, author who has written novels on his own and has co-authored three James Patterson novels
- Belinda Sutton, considered an early activist for reparations for enslavement
- E. Leroy Sweetser, U.S. Army brigadier general, born in Medford
- Alexander Theroux, poet and author of Darconville's Cat
- Paul Theroux, author
- Keith Tkachuk, NHL player
- Ed Tryon, halfback at Colgate University, elected to College Football Hall of Fame in 1963
- Bob Tufts (1955–2019), Major League Baseball pitcher

== See also ==
- Blessing of the Bay
- List of Fletcher (Tufts University) alumni
- List of Registered Historic Places in Medford, Massachusetts
