= Blessing of the Bay =

History

England
- Name: Blessing of the Bay
- Owner: John Winthrop
- Builder: Robert Molton, Mistick (now Medford, Massachusetts)
- Launched: July 4, 1631

General characteristics
- Class & type: Barque
- Tons burthen: 30 tons

Blessing of the Bay was the second oceangoing, non-fishing vessel built in what is now the United States, preceded only by the Virginia, in 1607.

== Construction ==
The Blessing of the Bay was a thirty-ton barque or a pinnace, built largely of locust tree wood. According to John R. Spears, Blessing of the Bay was not a bark except as the term was used to designate any sailing vessel at the time. He also stated that she had one mast. William H. Clark calls the Blessing of the Bay "primarily a trading vessel, but armed and designed to fight." He also stated, "she was high-bowed with one mast."

The ship was built for John Winthrop at Mistick (now Medford, Massachusetts), by Robert Molton and other shipwrights sent to New England in 1629 by the Massachusetts Bay Company, and was launched July 4, 1631, under the command of Anthony Dike.

== Coastal voyages to New Amsterdam ==
Blessing of the Bay was built "for the use of the Massachusetts Colony at the insistence of Governor Winthrop, and was finished under his eye, the object being to open communication with the Dutch at the mouth of the Hudson and to trade to various parts of the coast."

She went to sea August 31, 1631, and carried on a coastal trade as far south as the Dutch settlement of New Amsterdam (New York City). "She traded regularly along the entire New England coast and around Cape Cod and Long Island and with the Dutch on Manhattan Island. She carried to the Dutch salt from sea water, maple sugar, and probably clapboards, in exchange for molasses, sugar from the West Indies, and the spices and tea that the Dutch ships brought from the East via Amsterdam." Hall says that she sailed to "Long Island and other settled localities."

== Loss of the ship ==
Blessing of the Bay was lost on December 15, 1638, per Governor Winthrop diary: "The wind at N. E., there was so great a tempest of wind and snow all the night and the next day, as had not been since our time... Anthony Dick [sic], in a bark of thirty tons, cast away upon the head of Cape Cod. Three were starved to death with the cold; the other two got some fire and so lived there, by such food as they saved, seven weeks, till an Indian found them."

Captain Anthony Pike was one of the ones who perished.
