= Isaac Royall Jr. =

Antiguan-born American merchant, politician and slave trader

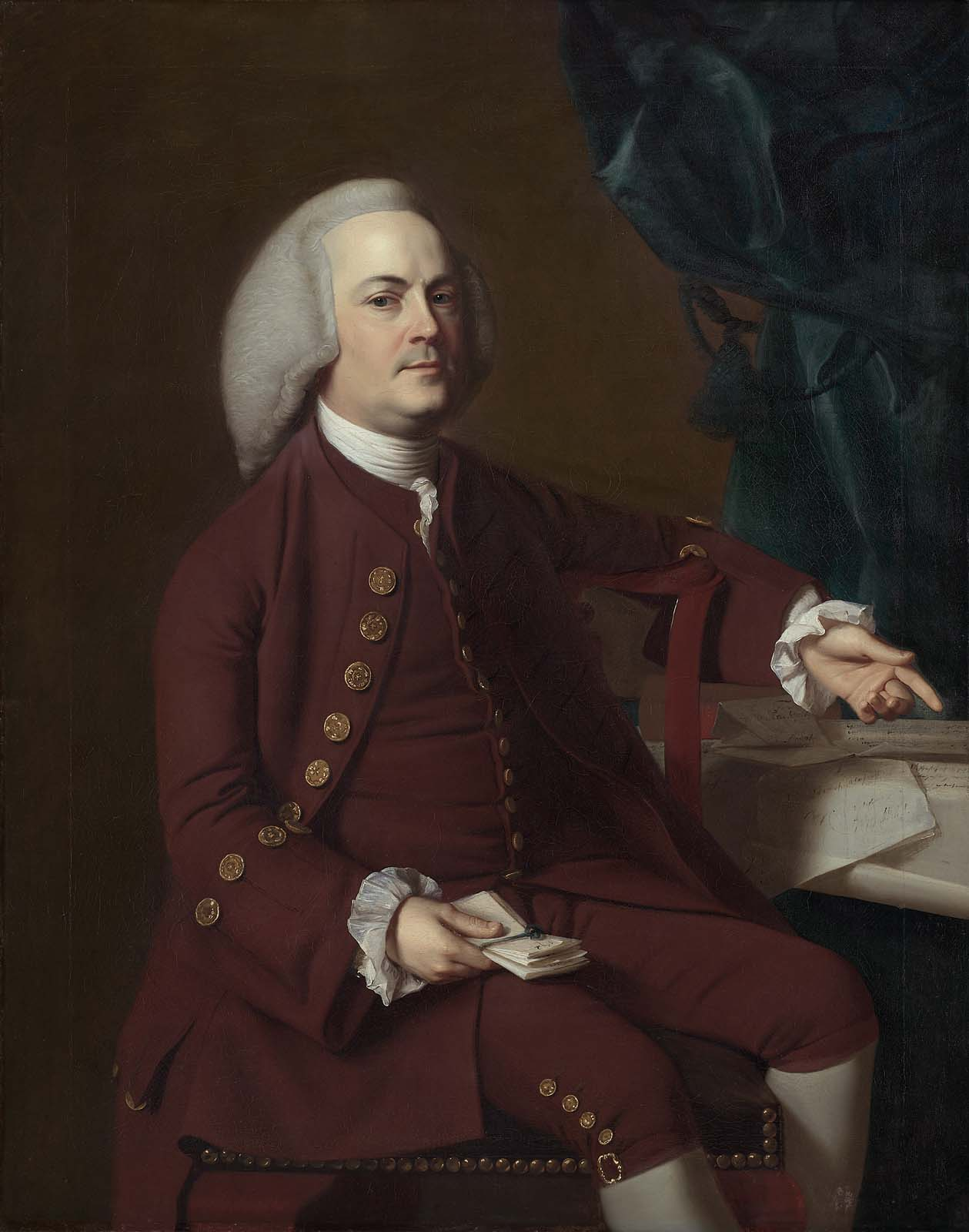
1769 portrait of Royall by John Singleton Copley

Isaac Royall Jr. (1719 – 1781) was an Antiguan-born merchant, politician and slave trader who spent the majority of his life in the Province of Massachusetts Bay.

== Early life ==
Royall was born in 1719 in the British colony of Antigua to Isaac Royall Sr. and Elizabeth Browne. His father was born in North Yarmouth in modern-day Maine before moving to Dorchester, Massachusetts in 1675. Isaac had eventually settled in Antigua, purchasing a slave plantation on the island in 1700; he also traded in rum, sugar, and slaves. In 1736, when Royall was 17, British colonial officials in Antigua gained wind of a planned slave rebellion among the colony's slaves, and responded with a brutal crackdown; "[a] total of 132 enslaved persons were convicted, and 88 executed: five by being broken on the wheel, six by gibbeting, and 77 by burning at the stake." Royall's father played a role in the crackdown; "[the] executed individuals were held in bondage by a total of 60 different individuals and estates," including Hector, an enslaved overseer who was owned by Royall's father. When Hector was burned at the stake, Isaac received £70 in compensation.

== Life in Massachusetts ==
Concomitantly, a series of events which affected Antigua, such as a drought in 1725, a hurricane in 1733, earthquakes in 1735, and a smallpox epidemic in 1737 severely impacted the Royall family's finances. In 1737, the Royall family returned to Massachusetts, with Royall's father having purchased a 500-acre estate near the Mystic River in Charlestown known as Ten Hills Farm in 1732. The estate was originally owned and named by the colony's first governor, John Winthrop. When they moved to Massachusetts, the Royall family brought at least 27 slaves with them, making them "the largest slaveholding family" in the colony. From 1732 to 1737, Royall's uncle had gradually remodelled Ten Hills Farm to include a three-story Georgian mansion (expanded from an earlier, more modest structure), a carriage house, a stable, an outdoor kitchen, and a number of barns.

After Royall's father died in 1739, Royall, then twenty years old, inherited his estate, alternatively described as "immense" or "small but prosperous", and he renamed Ten Hills Farm as "Royallville". Like his father, Royall worked as a merchant and profited greatly from his sugar plantation in Antigua. His financial activities, which included real estate investments, slave trading, and the ownership of slaves, made Royall one of the wealthiest people in the New England Colonies. He purchased household silver from Paul Revere and high-quality porcelain and furniture from abroad, traveled in an elaborate coach with liveried footmen, and hosted lavish parties.

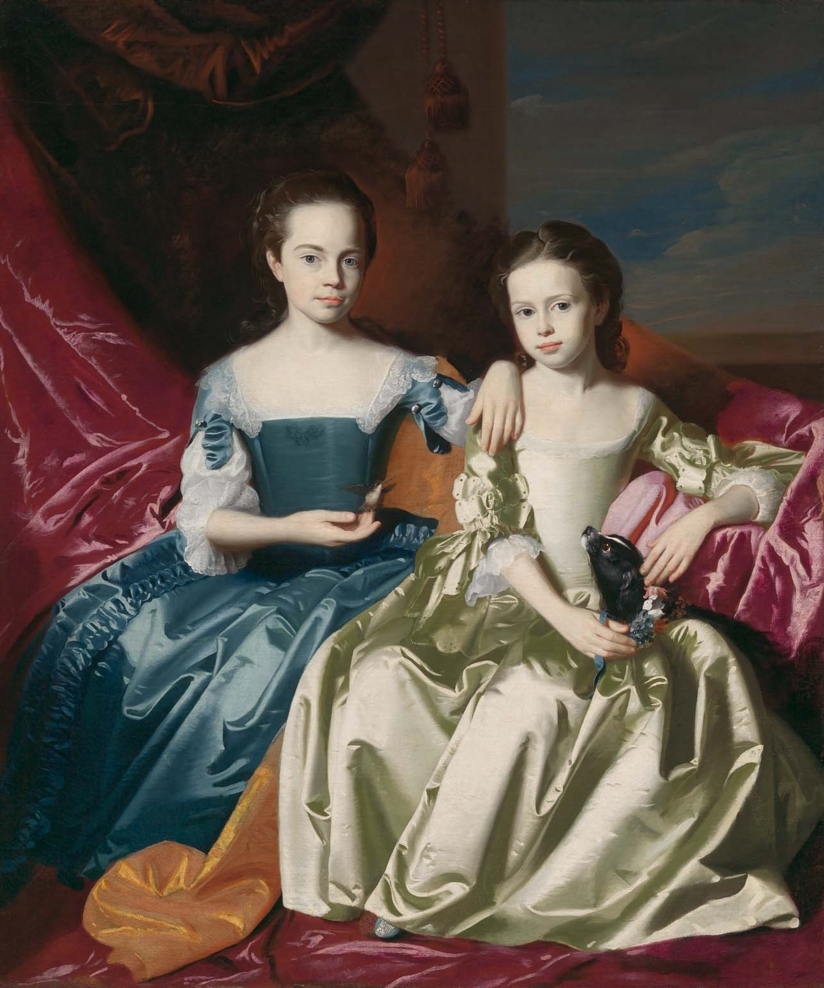
c. 1758 painting of Royall's daughters Mary and Elizabeth Royall by Copley

Royall also entered into a political career, serving as a justice of the peace, the chairman of Medford, Massachusetts' select board, and represented Medford in the Massachusetts General Court (returning his salaries to the town treasury). He was also appointed to the Massachusetts Governor's Council in 1752, remaining there until 1774, along with being appointed to the honorary military rank of Brigadier General of the Province and serving on Harvard College's Board of Overseers. Royall also held pews at King's Chapel and Christ Church in Massachusetts, and served as a colonel in the Massachusetts Militia.

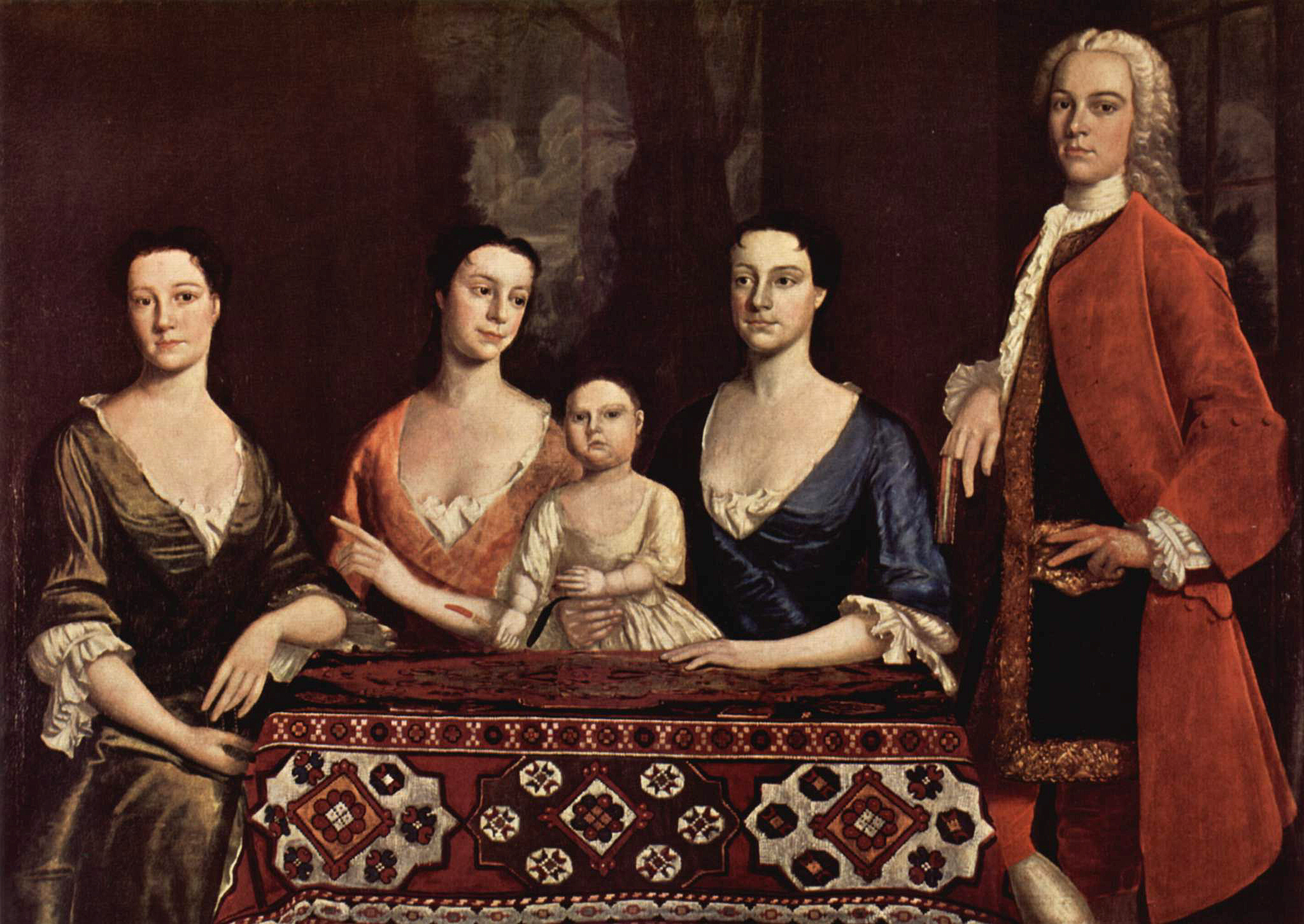
A c. 1741 painting of Royall's family by Robert Feke

In 1738, Royall married Elizabeth McIntosh, the 15-year-old daughter of a friend of Royall's father. The marriage was advantageous and confirmed Royall's status as a member of the New England elite. Royall and Elizabeth had three daughters, Elizabeth (who died as a child), Mary, and Elizabeth. He commissioned several paintings of his family; in 1741, Robert Feke completed a group portrait that depicted Royall with his wife, sister Penelope, sister-in-law Mary McIntosh Palmer, and daughter Elizabeth. John Singleton Copley painted Royall's daughters Mary and Elizabeth c. 1758, his wife Elizabeth c. 1767, and Royall himself c. 1769.

== Later life and death ==
Elizabeth died in 1770. In 1775, as the American Revolutionary War neared, Royall's daughters left for England. Although he was sympathetic to the Patriot cause, Royall's wealth was based on his ties to powerful Loyalist families and the Crown. Royall fled Medford just three days before the Battles of Lexington and Concord, the first military engagement of the war. Failing to secure passage to Antigua, he sailed to Nova Scotia, instructing a friend to sell his slaves in Medford to finance his exile in England. After a year in Nova Scotia, Royall joined his daughters' families in England. He died there of smallpox in 1781.

== Legacy ==
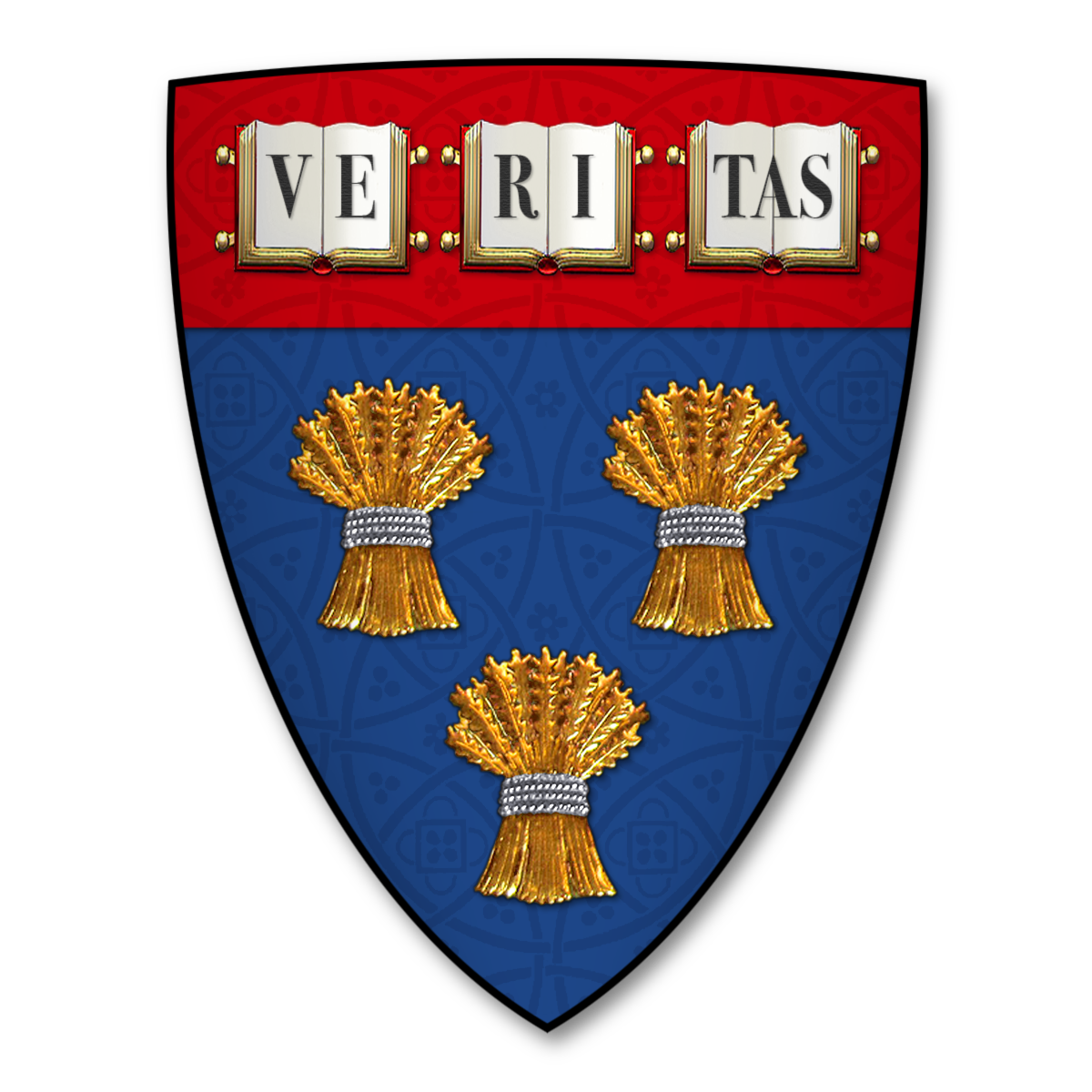
The former coat of arms of Harvard Law School, which was discontinued in 2016 because it incorporated Royall's coat of arms.

In his 1779 will, Royall emancipated his slave Belinda Royall (one of the 64 slaves they owned in Medford) and directed she be paid a pension funded by his estate. Belinda "had to petition the Massachusetts legislature six times to receive her due." Her successful 1783 lawsuit became one of the first instances of reparations for slavery in the United States. In Royall's will, he also left land to Harvard College to help the institution establish its first law professorship. This bequest led to the founding of Harvard Law School in 1817. In 1936, to celebrate Harvard University's tercentenary, Harvard alumnus and former professor Pierre de Chaignon la Rose created coat of arms for each of Harvard's graduate schools. For Harvard Law School, la Rose incorporated Royall's coat of arms, which was azure with three sheaves of wheat Or. The armorial bearings were adopted by the President and Fellows of Harvard College.

In 2016, the seal became the object of controversy due to Royall's ownership of slaves. A group of Harvard students operating under the name "Royall Must Fall" (inspired by the Rhodes Must Fall movement in South Africa) organized to have the seal removed. After several racist incidents involving members of Harvard Law School, the school's dean Martha L. Minow was pressured by students to create a committee of students, university employees, and alumni, which recommended that the seal be changed. In 2016, Harvard Law School officially removed their seal and subsequently replaced it with a new design. Royall's estate, now known as the Isaac Royall House, currently serves as a museum and historic site. It includes the only surviving example of freestanding slave quarters in the Northern United States.
