= Royall House and Slave Quarters =

Historic house in Massachusetts, United States

- Isaac Royall House
- U.S. National Register of Historic Places
- U.S. National Historic Landmark
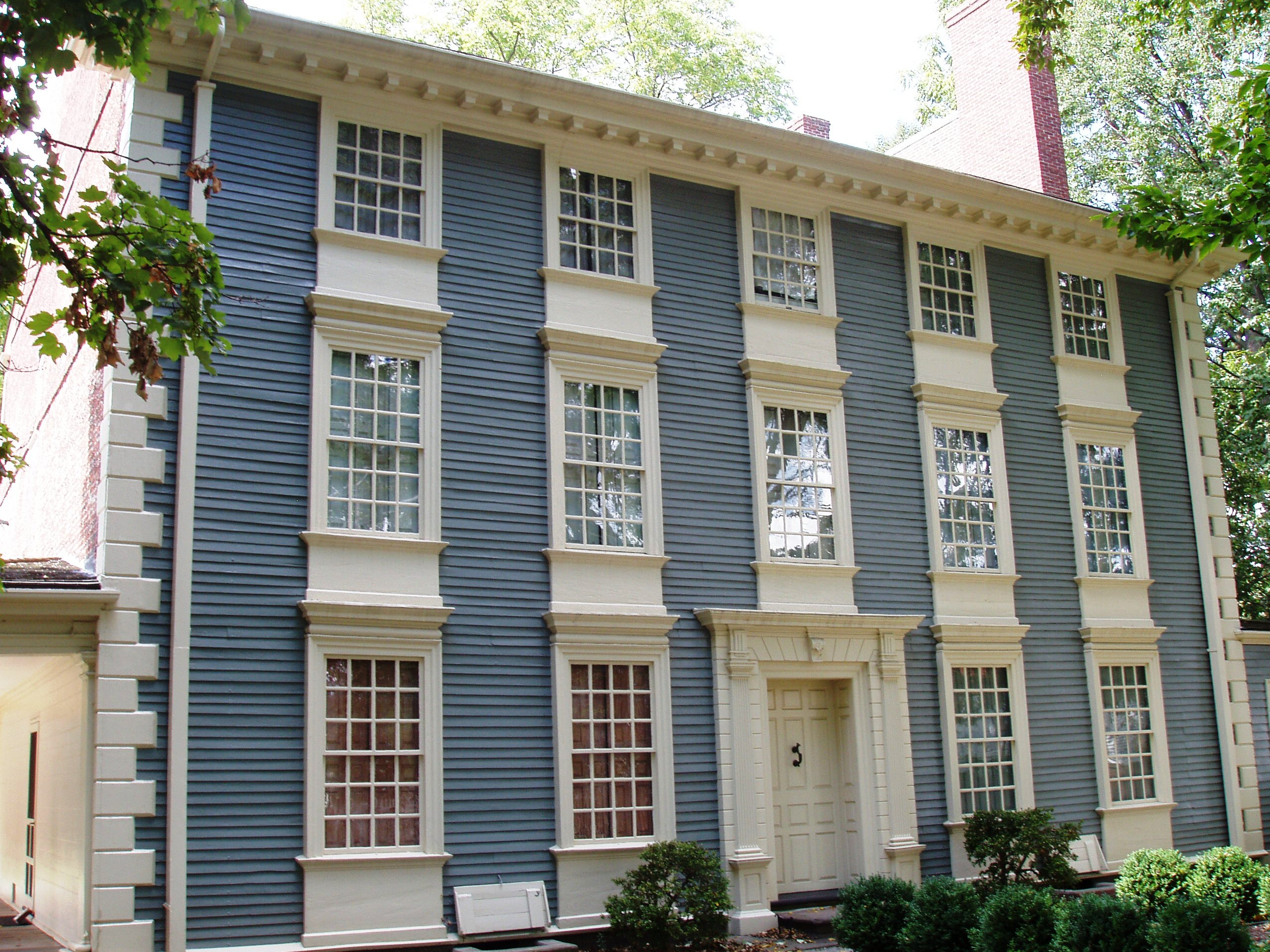
- East (front) facade, built by Isaac Royall Sr. over the original farmhouse

- Location within Massachusetts Location within the United States
- Location: 15 George Street, Medford, Massachusetts
- Coordinates: 42°24′43″N 71°6′44″W
- Built: 1732
- Architectural style: Georgian
- NRHP reference No.: 66000786

Significant dates
- Added to NRHP: October 15, 1966
- Designated NHL: October 9, 1960

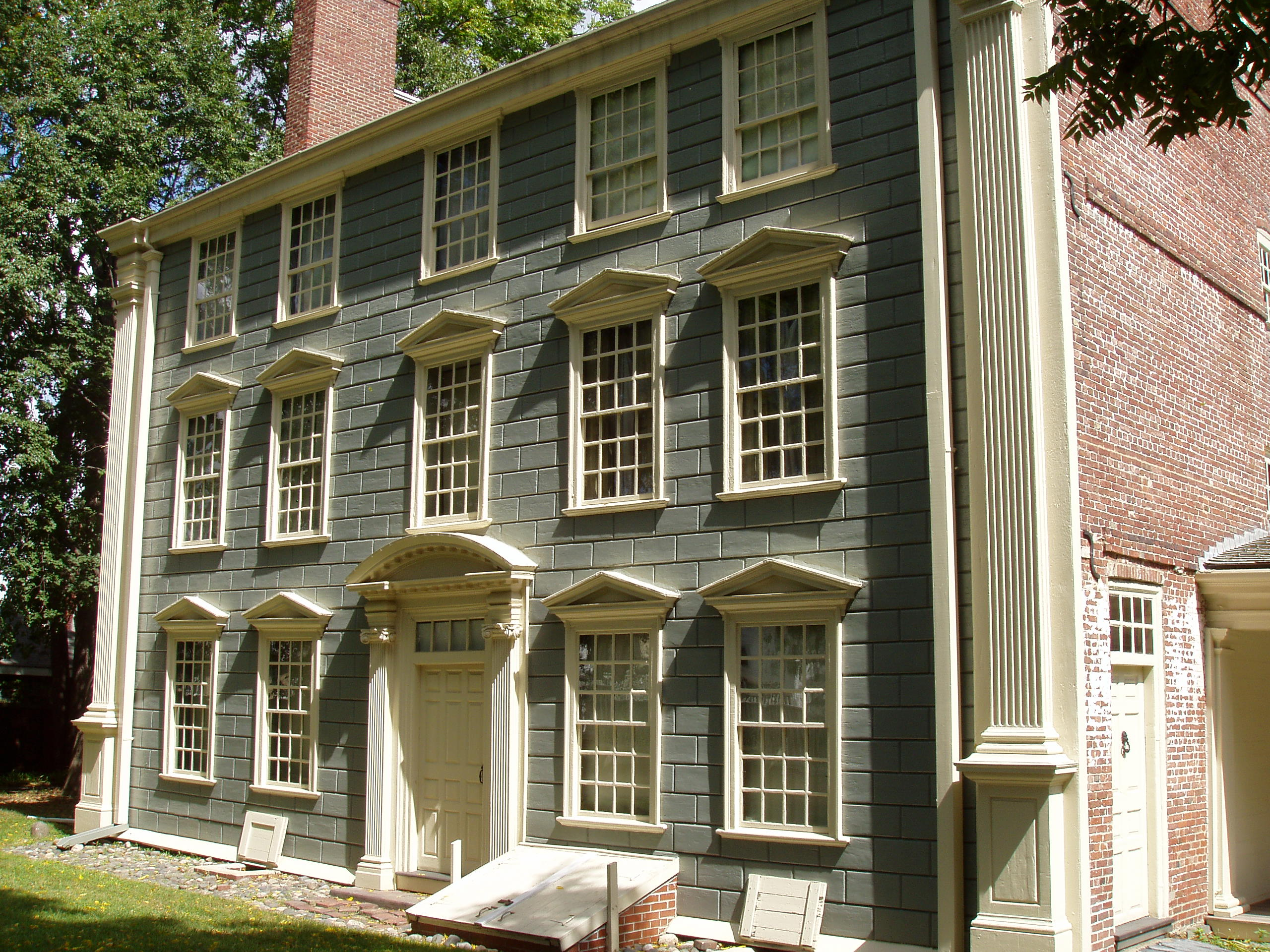
West (back) façade, built by Isaac Royall Jr. on the new portion of the house.

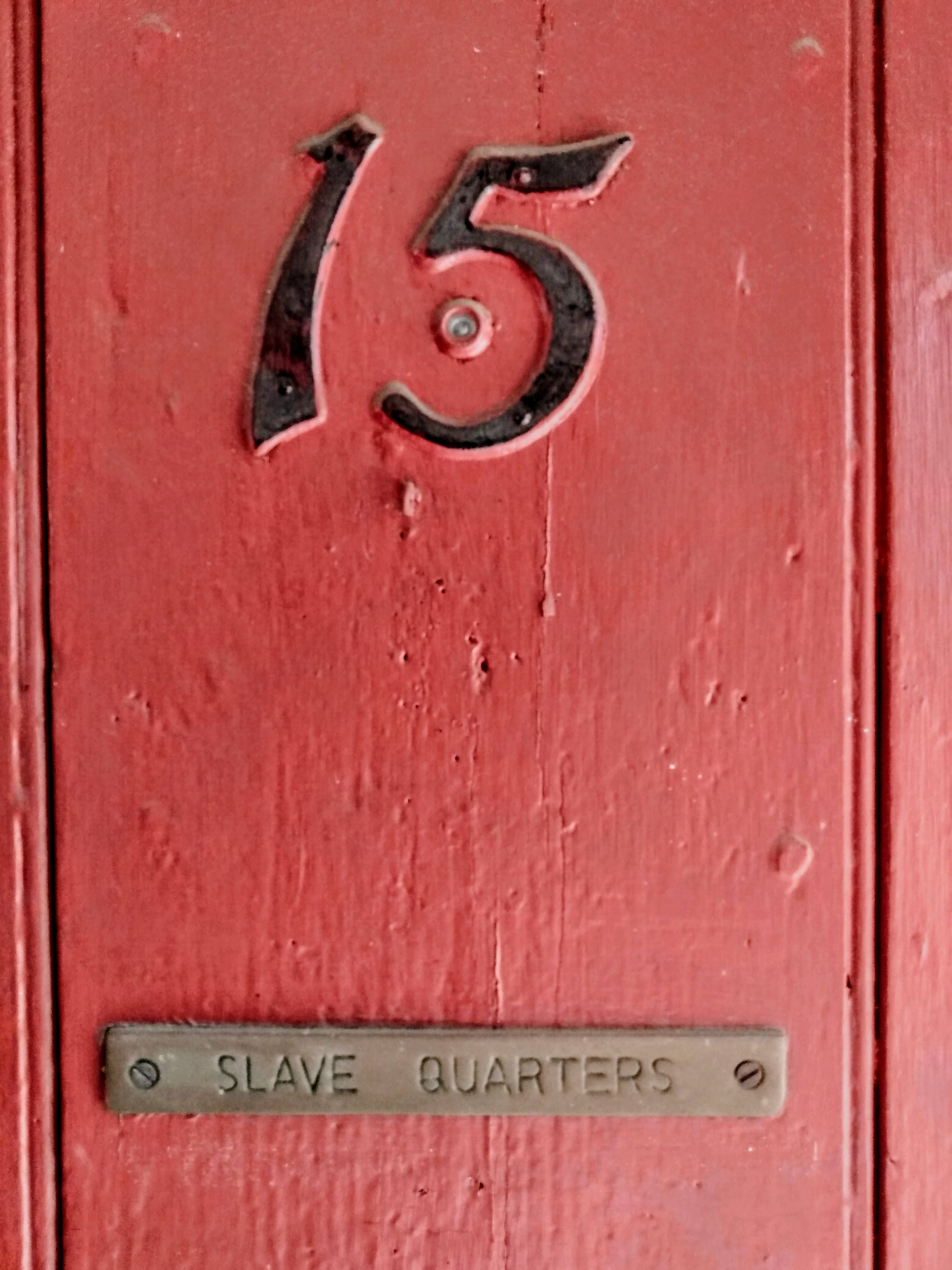
Royall House Slave Quarters entry door

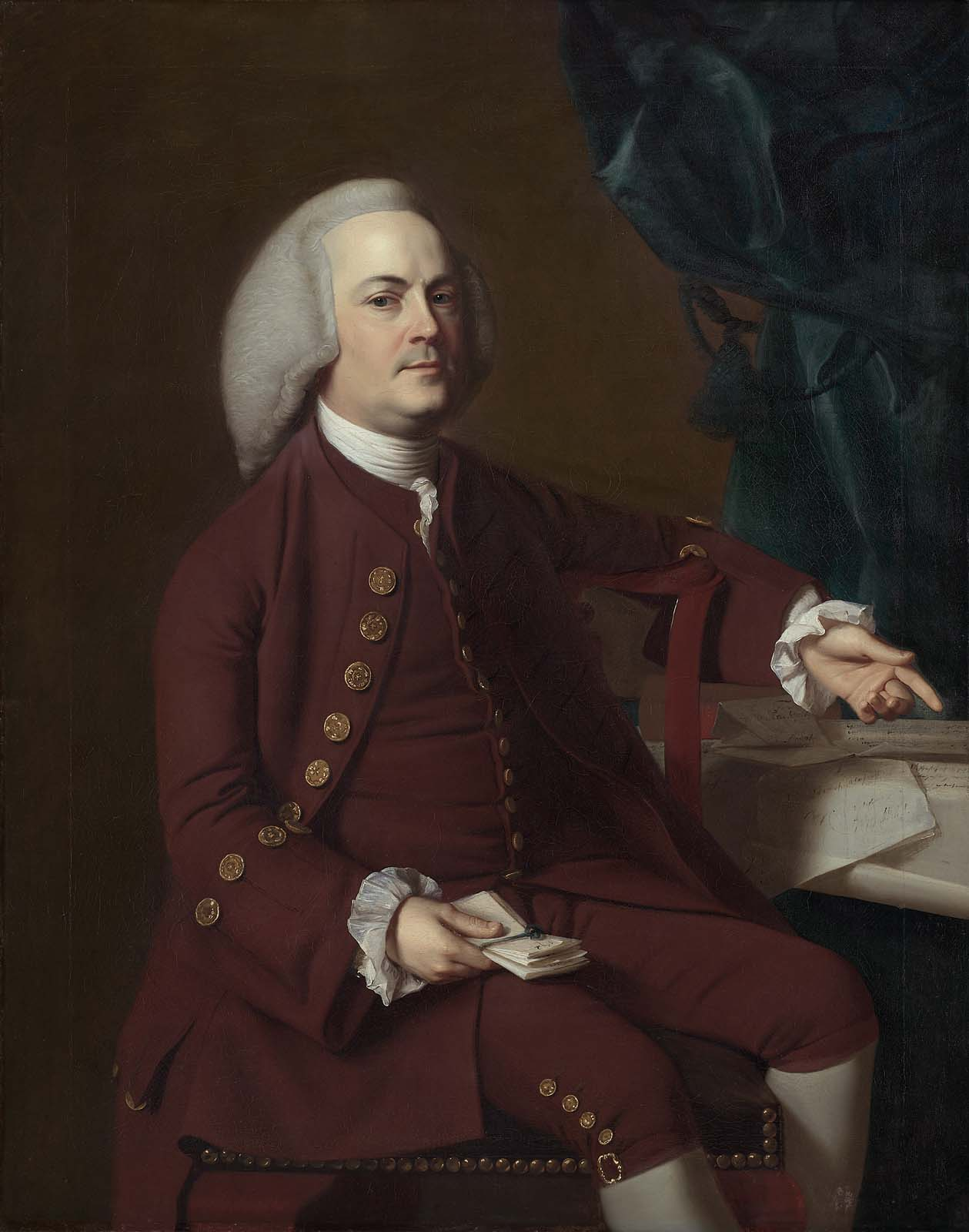
John Singleton Copley portrait of Isaac Royall Jr. (Museum of Fine Arts, Boston)

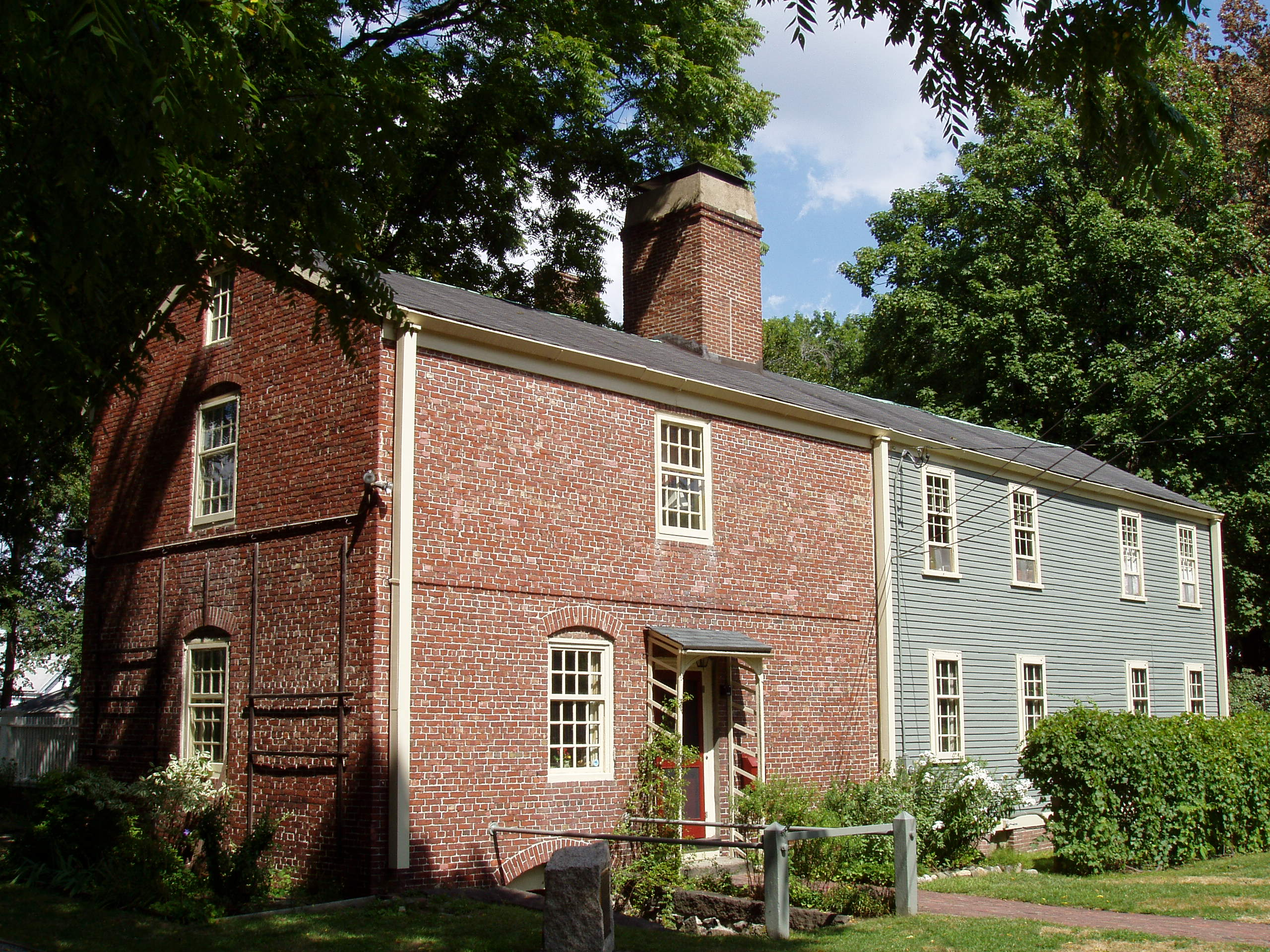
Slave quarters.

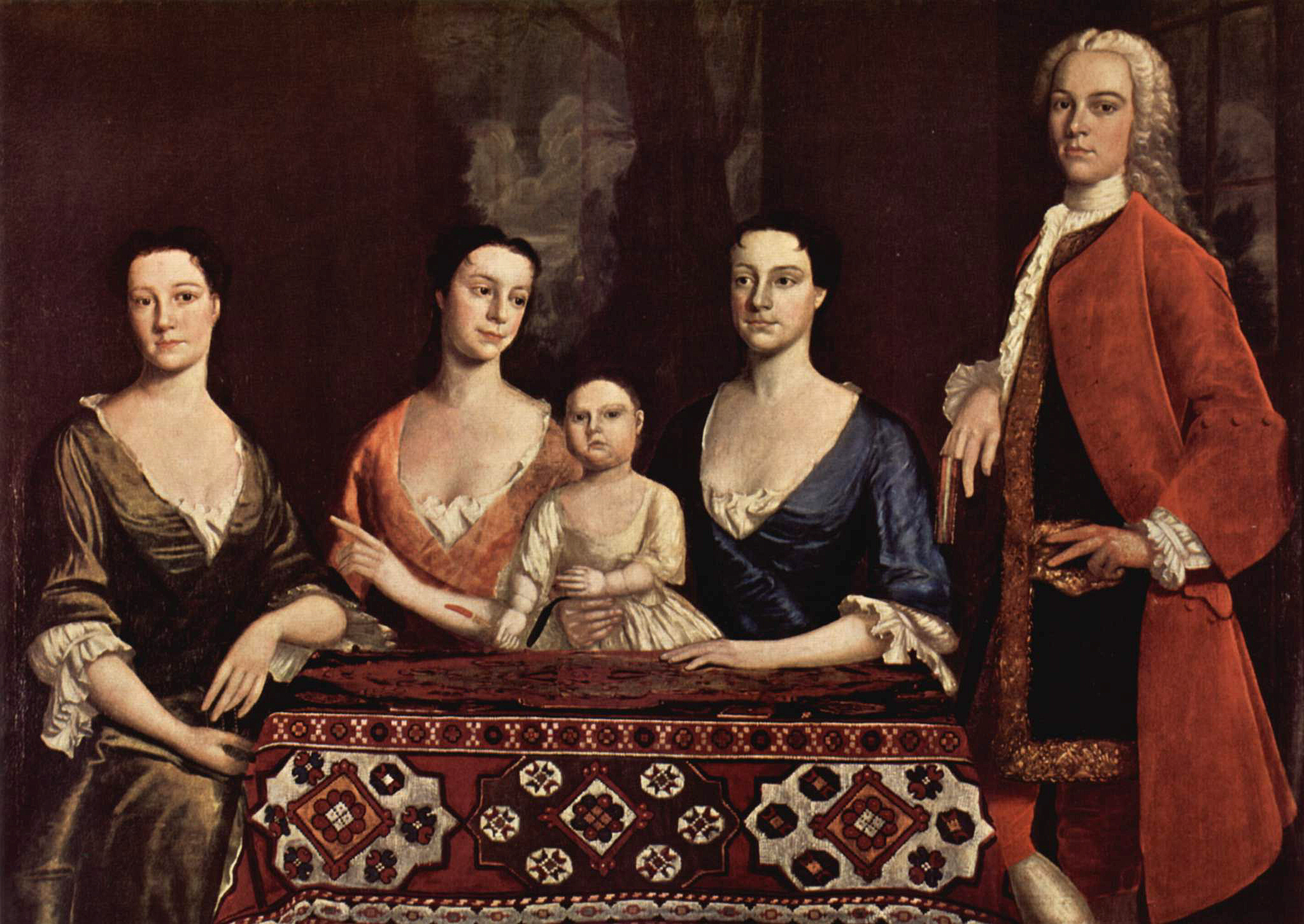
Isaac Royall Jr. with his wife and child at his side, and other relations, by Robert Feke, 1741

The Isaac Royall House and Slave Quarters is a historic house located in Medford, Massachusetts, near Tufts University. The historic estate was founded by Bay Colony native Isaac Royall. It is a National Historic Landmark, operated as a non-profit museum, and open for public visits between June 1 and the last weekend in October.

The Royall House is notable for its excellent preservation, its possession of the only surviving slave quarters in Massachusetts, and its American Revolution associations with General John Stark, Molly Stark, and General George Washington. Among the historic objects on display is a tea box, said to be from the same batch that was dumped into Boston Harbor on the night of December 16, 1773, and a very small painting by John Singleton Copley of Isaac Royall Jr. The Royalls were the largest slave-holding family in Massachusetts history.

== Origins ==
Governor John Winthrop received the property as a land grant in 1631, but there is no evidence that he built a house in this location. The core of the present-day mansion was built about 1692, during the ownership of Elizabeth Lidgett. It was an imposing brick structure standing 2½ stories high and one room in depth, with exceedingly thick walls. On December 26, 1732, Isaac Royall Sr., a slave trader, rum distiller, and wealthy merchant of Antigua, purchased the house and 504 acres (2 km^{2}) of land along the west bank of the Mystic River in what was then Charlestown, an area annexed to Medford in 1754. He remodeled the house extensively between 1733 and 1737, adding a third story, encasing the east facade in clapboard, and ornamenting the exterior with architectural details and continuous strips of spandrel panels. Royall also constructed outbuildings in 1732, including the only known freestanding slave quarters that survive in New England. After this construction, Royall brought 27 enslaved Africans from Antigua, which doubled the enslaved population of the community.

== Early history ==
Isaac Royall Jr. (1719–1781) came into its possession of the property in 1739 following the death of his father. He greatly enlarged it between 1747 and 1750. He more than doubled the depth of the main building, greatly extended the brick end walls correspondingly, and at either end of the house constructed great twin chimneys connected by parapets. Other features he added include the false ashlar siding on the new western facade and great Doric pilasters inserted at the corners. The interior was redone in Georgian wooden paneling, trim, and archways of a quality possibly unsurpassed by any surviving house of the period. Several of the major rooms that survive are original. He expanded a colonial farmhouse into a three-story Georgian mansion considered one of the grandest houses of its era in North America. The construction process was largely borrowed from Caribbean construction practices.

A painting of Mary and Elizabeth Royall, the teenage daughters of Isaac Royall Jr., executed by John Singleton Copley about 1758, is in the collection of Boston's Museum of Fine Arts. A reproduction hangs in the Royall House. Copley also painted their father's portrait about 1769. An earlier family portrait from 1740 is in the Special Collections Department, Harvard Law School Library.

During the American Revolution, the Royall family were Loyalists, and after British soldiers skirmished with Patriot militiamen at the battles of Lexington and Concord in 1775, the Royalls left Medford and boarded a ship in Boston. They sailed to Halifax, Nova Scotia and then to England. Isaac Royall never returned to Medford.

After the Royalls' flight, the Massachusetts General Court confiscated the estate. John Stark made the Royall House his headquarters before the British evacuation of Boston on March 17, 1776. The mansion was notably used during the early months of the Revolution as the headquarters of George Washington's second-in-command, Charles Lee. Lee affectionately nicknamed it "Hobgoblin Hall", after Yester Castle in Scotland. Washington, according to legend, interrogated two British soldiers in the house's Marble Chamber. The story that Molly Stark watched the movements of the British troops in their camp by the river from a lookout on the roof is undocumented.

In 1806, the estate was returned to Isaac Royall's heirs, who sold it. In accordance with Isaac Royall's will, a portion of his estate was donated to Harvard University and used to found Harvard Law School.

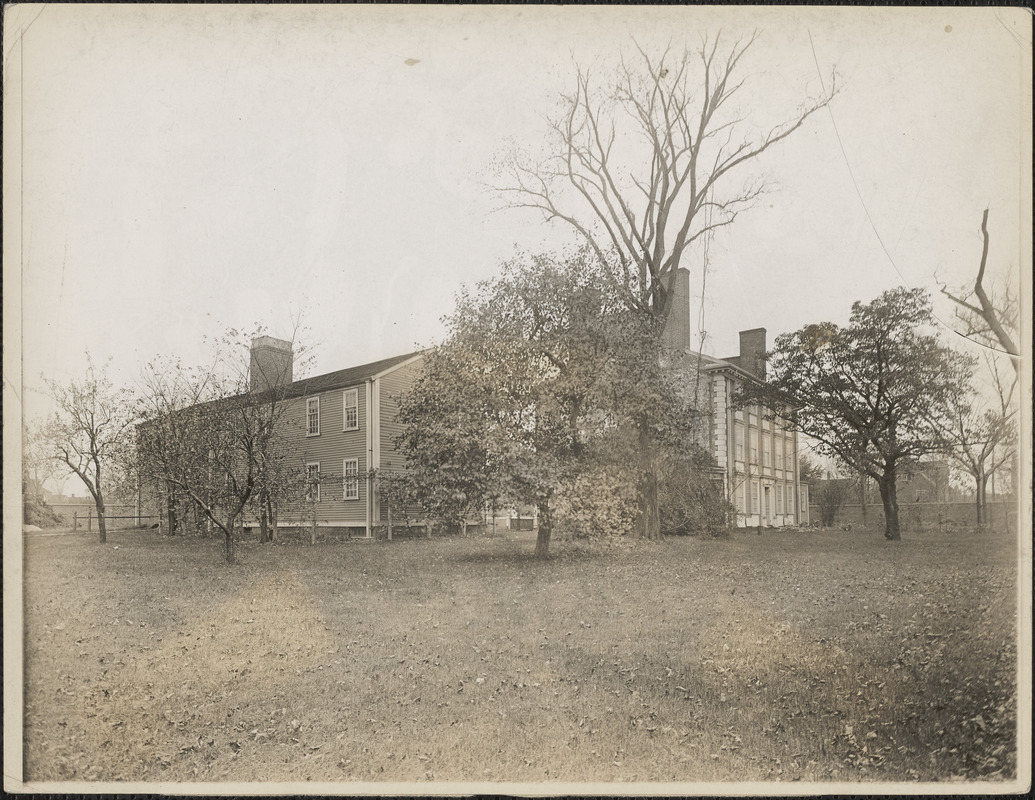
Royall House and slave quarters, Medford, Mass., November 2, 1920. Leon Abdalian Collection, Boston Public Library

== Slave Quarters ==
The Slave Quarters were located in Medford 35 feet from the Royall House. More than 60 enslaved Africans resided there over a 40-year period.

When Sir Isaac Royall Sr. expanded the house in the 1730s, he adopted a practice from the Caribbean and built an "out kitchen", a detached kitchen meant to keep the heat away from the main house in the summer. In the 1760s, a clapboard extension was added which expanded the house further and formed the original slave quarters.

The Slave Quarters had working and sleeping quarters, and a summer kitchen. There is a "kitchen chamber" where slaves worked and slept in a room on the second floor, visited in current tours of the Royall House.

One of the enslaved women from the Royall House, Belinda Sutton, is noted for her court petitions for a pension from the estate of the Royall family, considered to be one of the earliest cases of reparations for slavery in the United States.

== Preservation ==
In 1898, the Sarah Bradlee Fulton Chapter of the Daughters of the American Revolution conceived the idea of preserving the Royall House "for the sake of its history and aesthetic value." It was restored by Joseph Everett Chandler. On Patriots' Day in 1898, they opened the house to the public for a Loan Exhibition of colonial furnishings and valuable relics.

In 1906, this group of women recruited a wider group of "patriotic men and women" and formed the Royall House Association. The group's initial mission was to raise US$10,000 (~$245,558 in 2024) to purchase the house, the slave quarters and three-quarters of an acre of surrounding land to be maintained as a museum, which they accomplished by April 1908.

Over the years, the Royall House has undergone a number of interior and exterior restorations to its buildings and site. In 1960, the Royall House was designated a National Historic Landmark.

In 2023, Harvard Law School and the Royall House and Slave Quarters entered a cooperation agreement, including financial support, as one initiative by the school to honor the work of enslaved people which contributed to the existence of Harvard University.

== See also ==
- List of National Historic Landmarks in Massachusetts
- National Register of Historic Places listings in Medford, Massachusetts
