= Mystic River Reservation =

Nature reserve in Massachusetts

Mystic River State Reservation
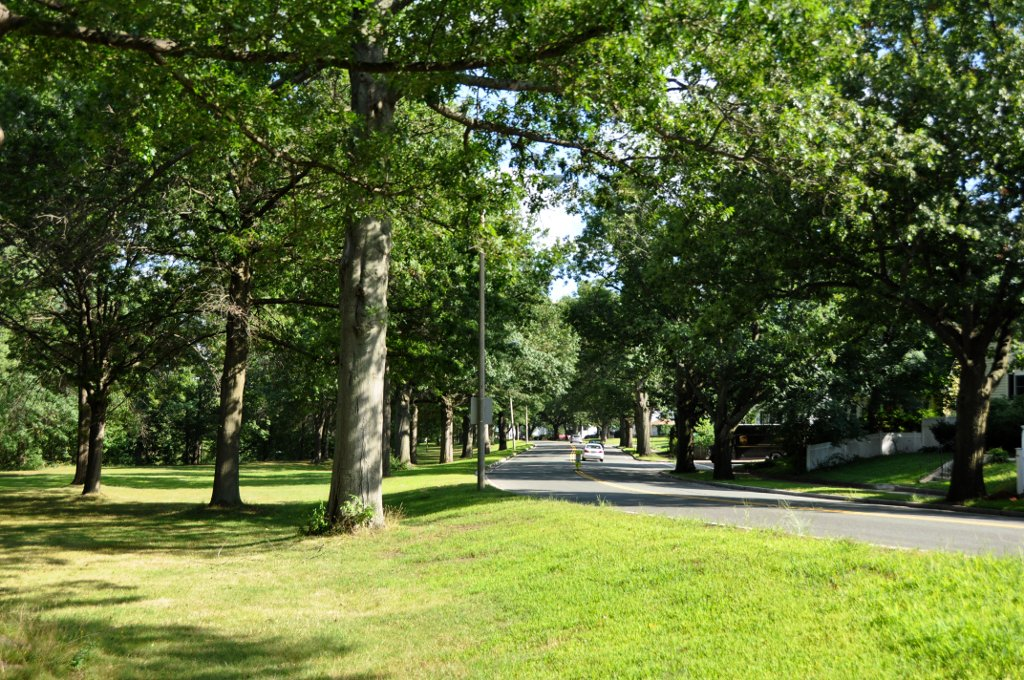
- A view of the park and the Mystic Valley Parkway in Arlington

- Location within Massachusetts Location within the United States
- Location: Middlesex and Suffolk counties, Massachusetts, United States
- Coordinates: 42°26′00″N 71°08′58″W
- Area: 329 acres (133 ha)
- Elevation: 7 ft (2.1 m)
- Established: 1893
- Administrator: Massachusetts Department of Conservation and Recreation
- Website: Official website

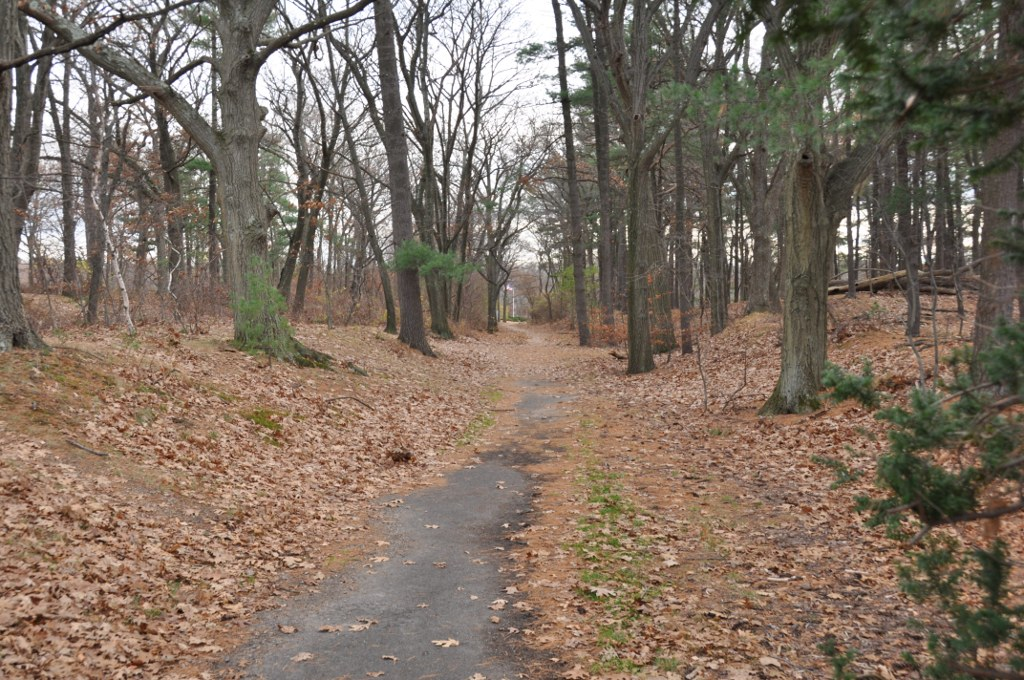
A walking path (a dry section of the former Middlesex Canal) near Senator Charles E. Shannon Jr. Memorial Beach (formerly Sandy Beach) in Winchester

Mystic River State Reservation is a publicly owned nature preserve with recreational features located along the Mystic River in the towns of Winchester, Arlington, Medford, Somerville, Everett, and Chelsea in eastern Massachusetts. The reserve is part of the nearly 76-square-mile (200 km^{2}) Mystic River watershed. It is managed by the Massachusetts Department of Conservation and Recreation.

== History ==
The reservation was established in 1893 by the newly formed Metropolitan Parks Commission (later renamed the Metropolitan District Commission), making it one of the first official nature preserves in Massachusetts, and one of five designed by the commission in that year. Of these five, three were planned as woodland river reservations: the Mystic River Reservation, Charles River Reservation, and Neponset River Reservation. The Mystic River Reservation originally comprised a little over 250 acres (100 ha) of land. By the early 20th century, most of the land along the Mystic River in Medford, Arlington, and Somerville had become public (i.e. state-owned) land.

In 2010, the DCR unveiled a plan for restoring and preserving the reservation, called the Mystic River Master Plan. Proposed projects included a partnership between the DCR and the City of Medford to restore the Condon Shell (an outdoor amphitheater located just outside Medford Square); restoration of the Amelia Earhart Dam basin parklands; and a $3.6 million federally funded link between the reservation, the Minuteman Bikeway, and the Alewife "T" Station. The lower parkland is being redeveloped as part of Assembly Square construction.

In 2019, the Commonwealth of Massachusetts funded a feasibility study for the Mystic to Charles Connector Path linking the southern end of the bicycle and pedestrian paths in the reservation (near Sullivan Square) to the Somerville Community Path, for connections to the Charles River Bicycle Path and downtown Boston. Reconstruction of Draw Seven Park is expected to last from late summer 2024 to 2026.

== Activities and amenities ==
Facilities for field sports, picnicking, cycling, and sailing are found at four riverside parks: Draw Seven Park in Somerville, Torbert MacDonald Park in Medford, the Mystic Lakes in Winchester, Arlington, and Medford, and Mary O'Malley Waterfront Park in Chelsea.

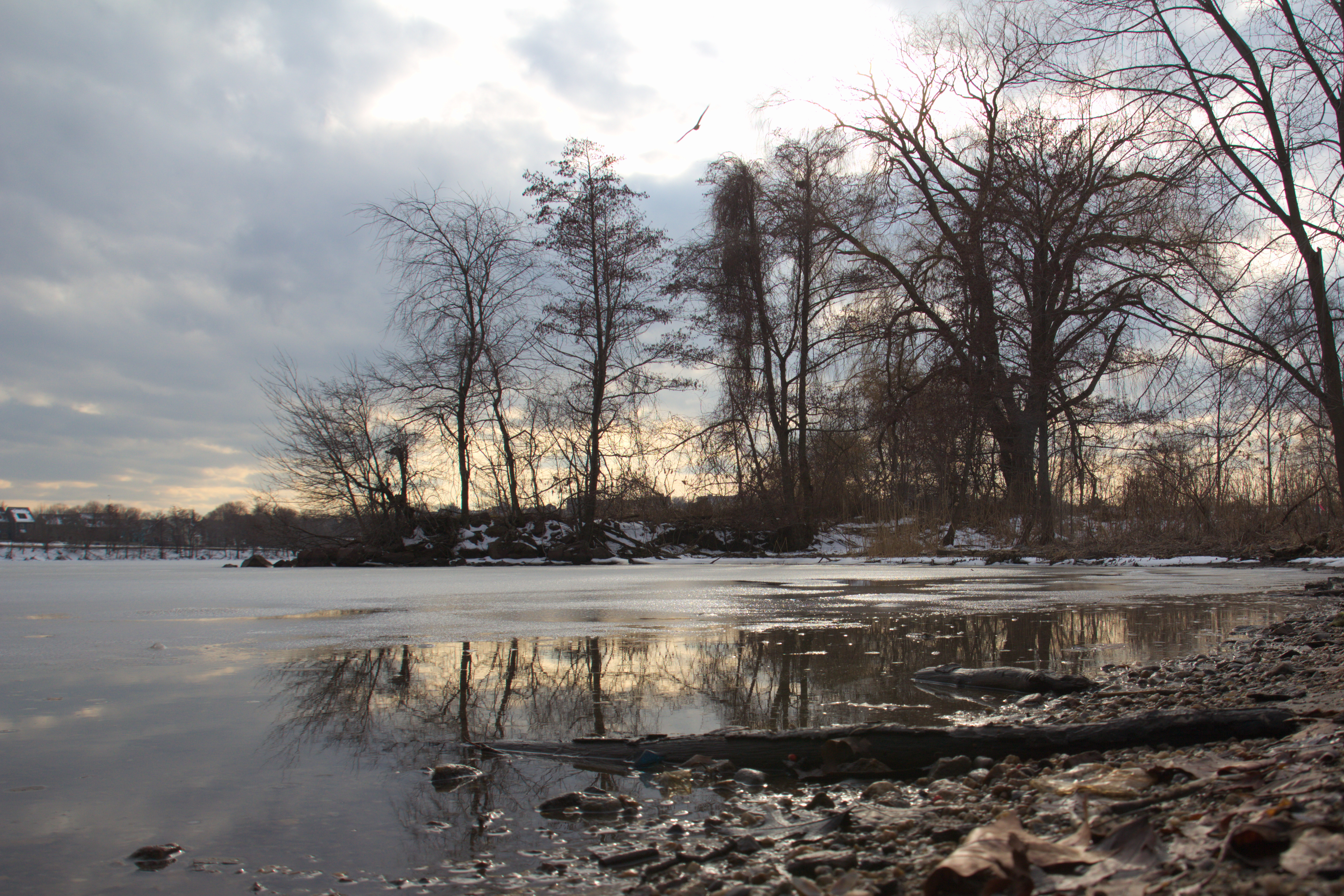
View of Mystic River from Mystic River Reservation
