= Mistick, Massachusetts =

Mistick, Massachusetts may refer to:

- An old name for part of Medford, Massachusetts
- An old name for part of Malden, Massachusetts
- The nearby Mystic River
