= Malden River =

River in the U.S. state of Massachusetts

Coordinates: 42.3967°N 71.0754°W

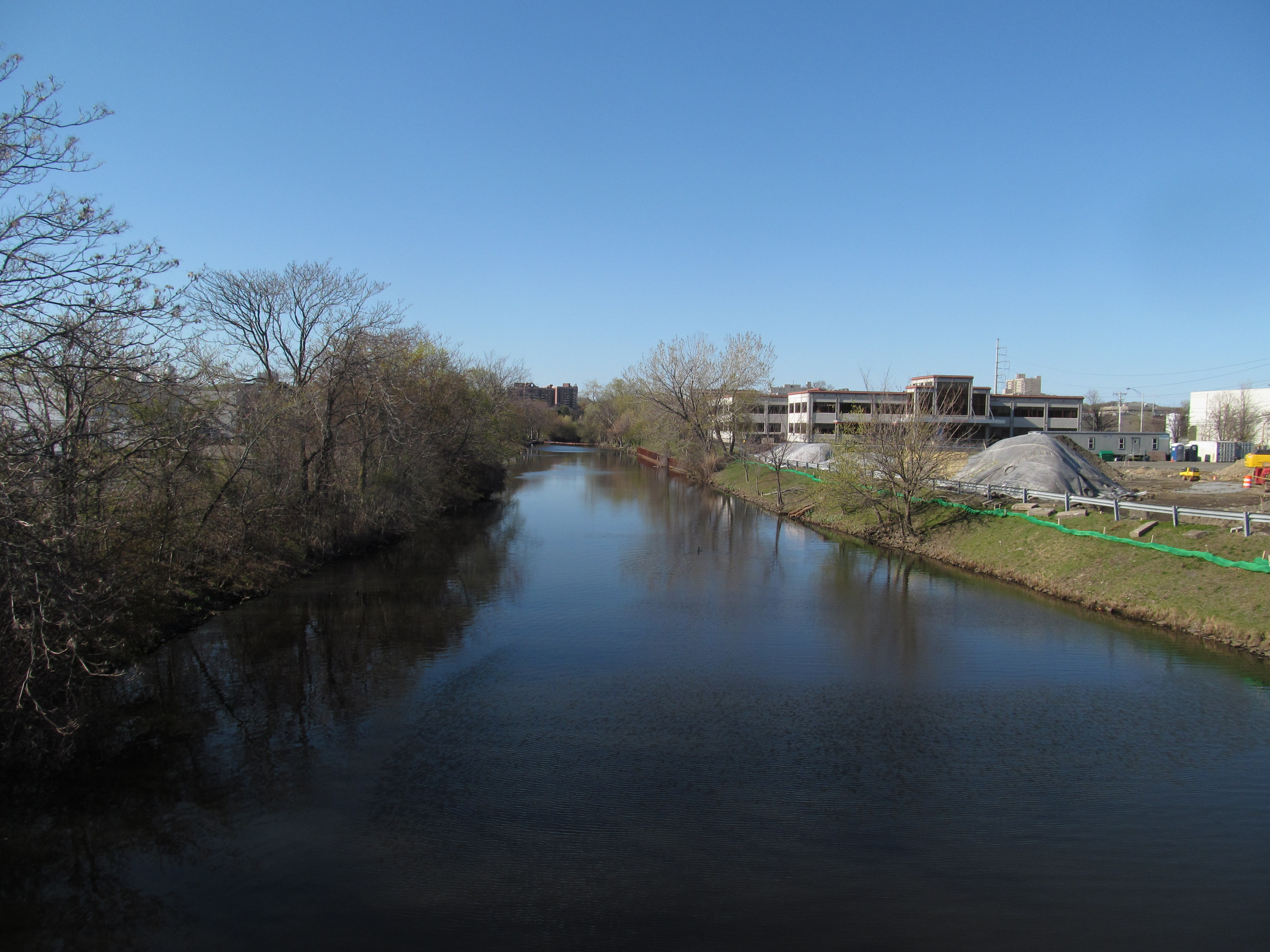
Malden River, north of Medford Street (2017)

The Malden River is a 2.3-mile-long (3.7 km) river in Malden, Medford, and Everett, Massachusetts. It is roughly 675 feet (206 m) wide at its widest point and is very narrow at its smallest point. Its banks are largely occupied by industrial business, and the river is scarcely used or even mentioned. Its water quality is worse than most local waters, including the Mystic River, into which it flows. The Mystic River Watershed Association is working and creating educational programs to help the environment. The Association works on projects to improve the Mystic River and tributaries, lakes and ponds and greenways along the waterfronts. Rivergreen Park is part of the Mystic Greenways and is along the Malden River. The Friends of the Malden River organize clean-up events.

Most agree that the river is under-utilized. Projects like Rivers Edge (formerly TeleCom City) hope to promote recreational use of the river's banks. Currently, crew teams, including the Malden High School and the Mystic Valley Regional Charter School, practice on the river because it is never crowded like the Charles River. Also, a state-of-the-art boat house is located in Medford on the west bank of the river, used by the Tufts University rowing team.

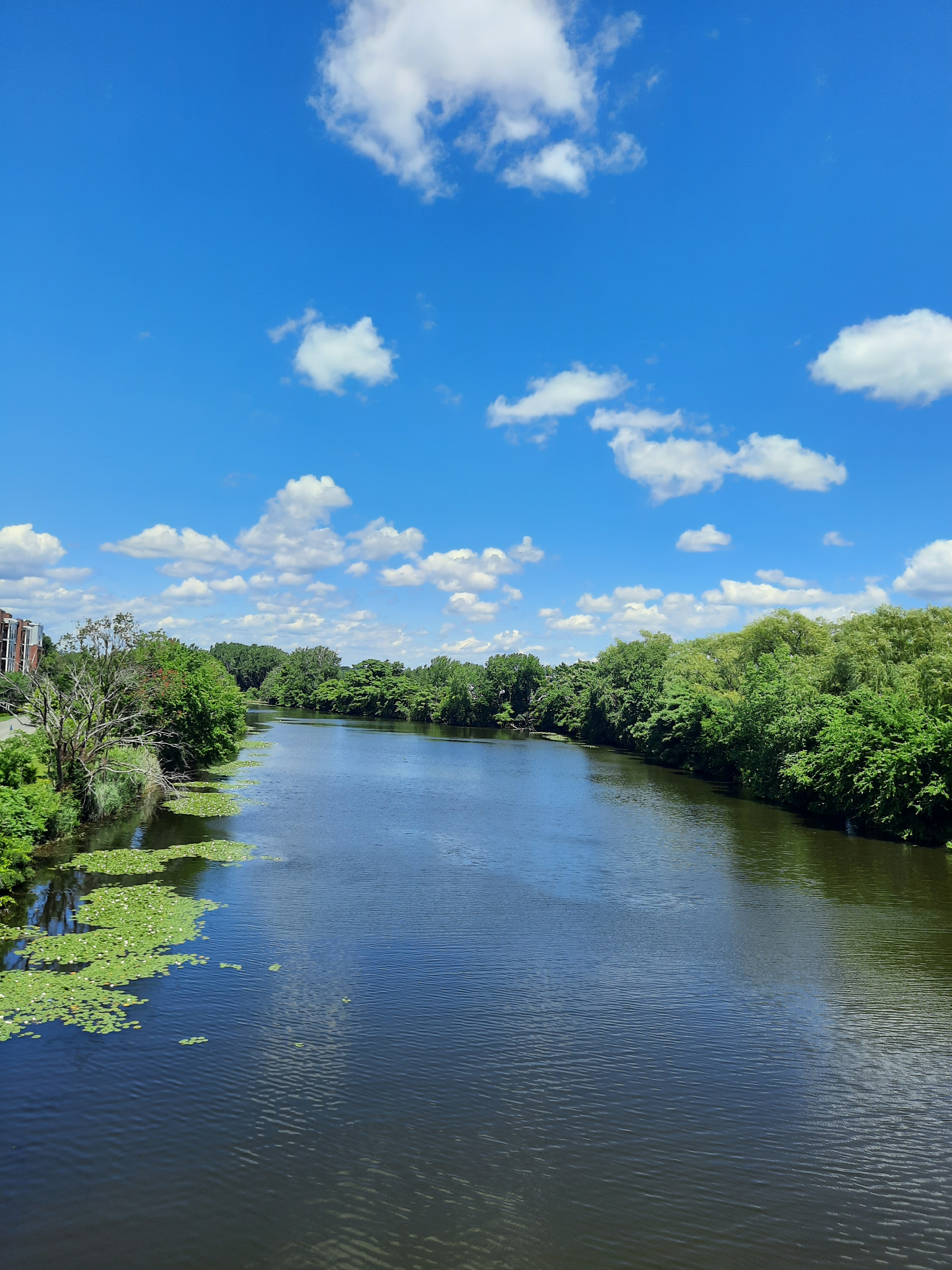
Malden River Medford MA July 2024

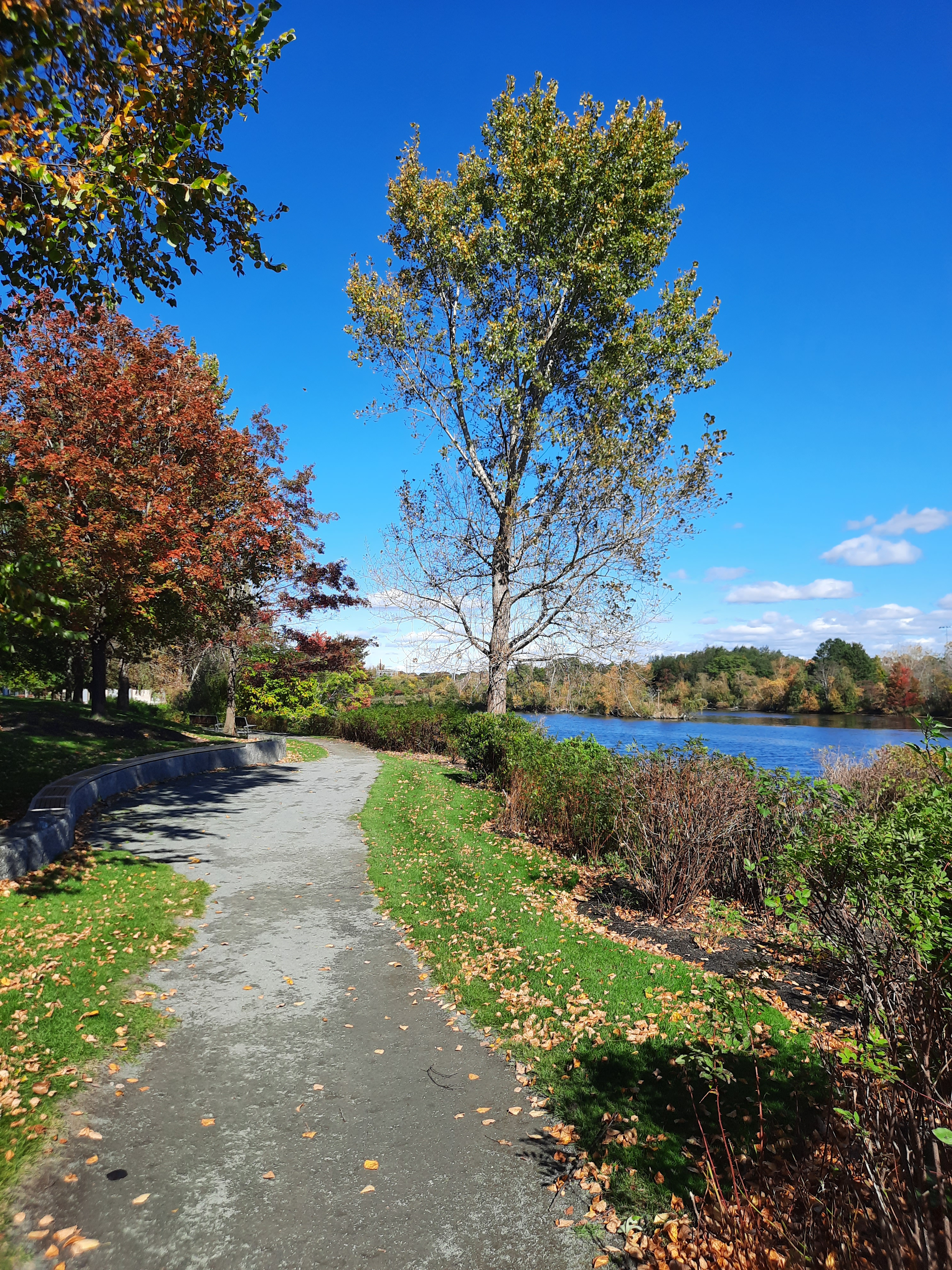
Walkway along the Malden River

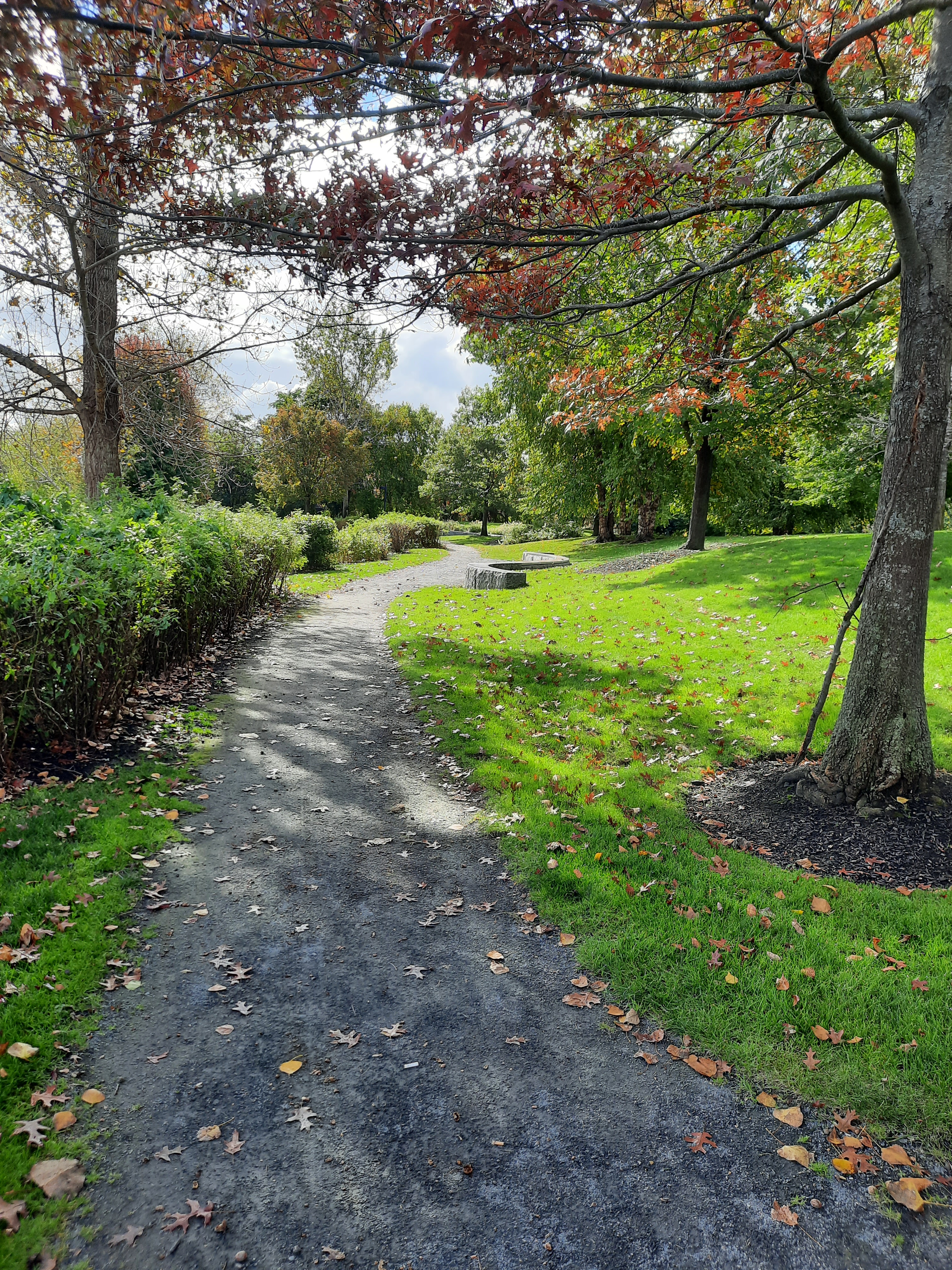
Walkway along the Malden River

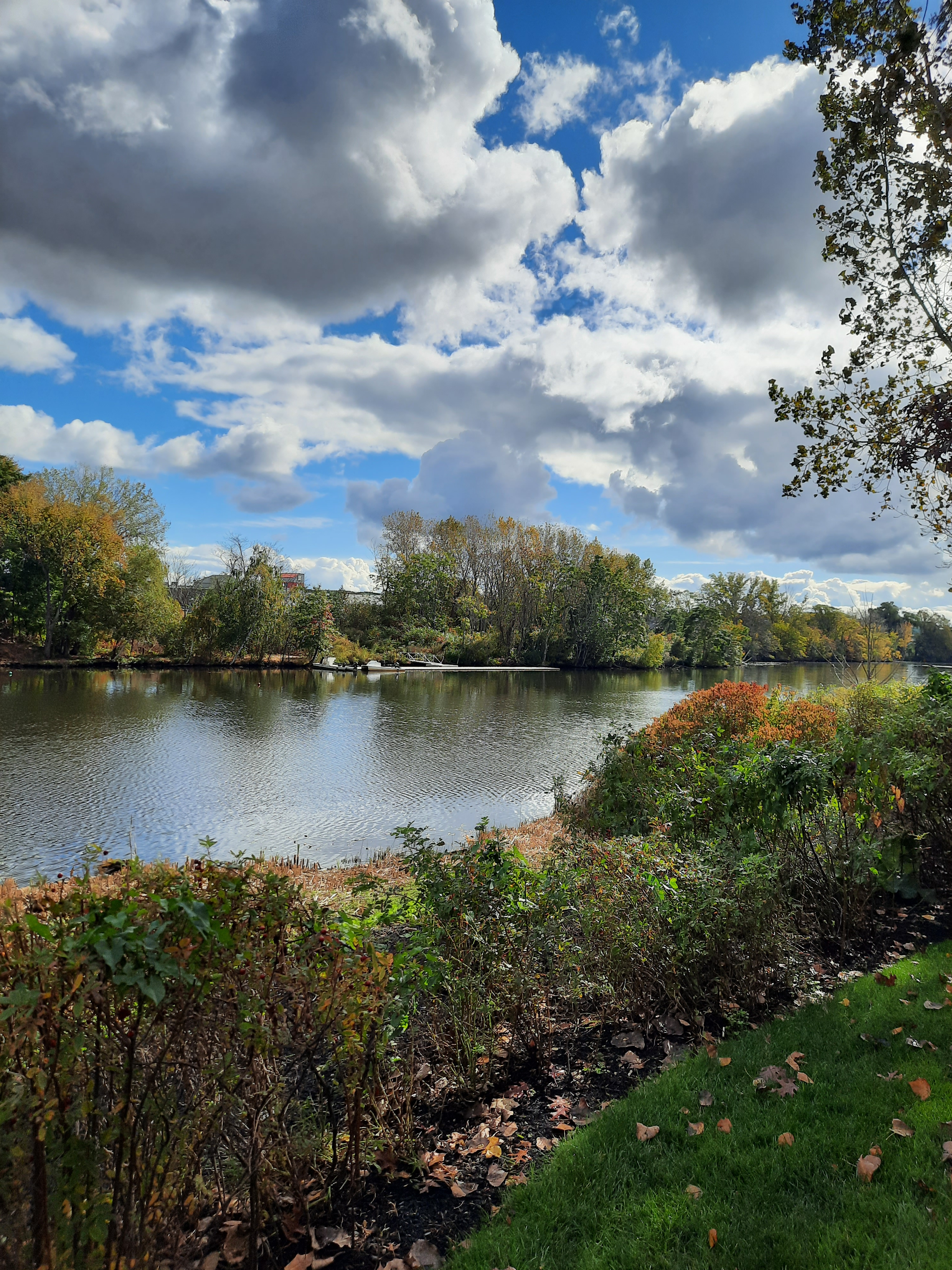
Malden River which flows into the Mystic River

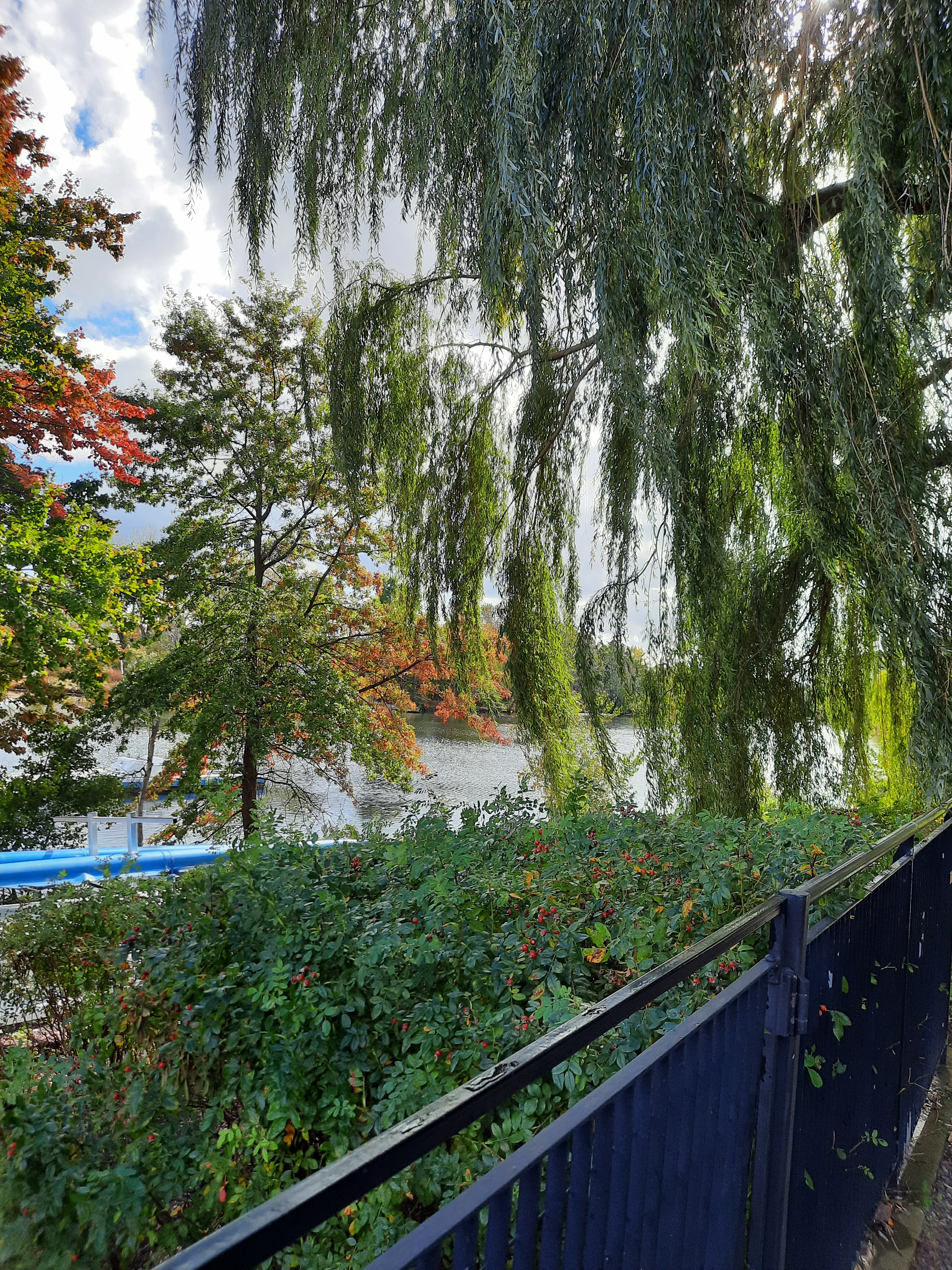
Willow tree by Malden River

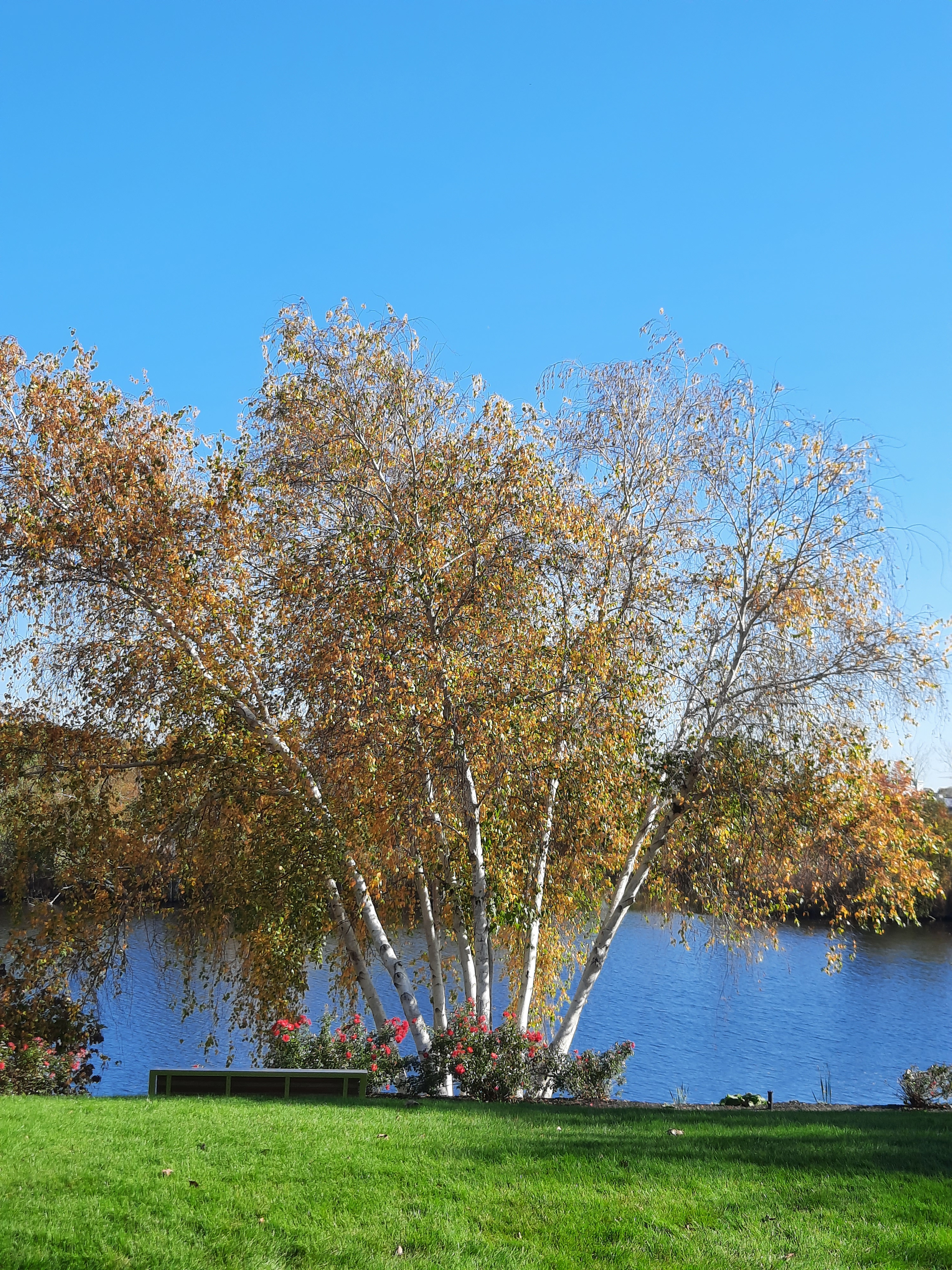
Birch Tree along Malden River (2023)

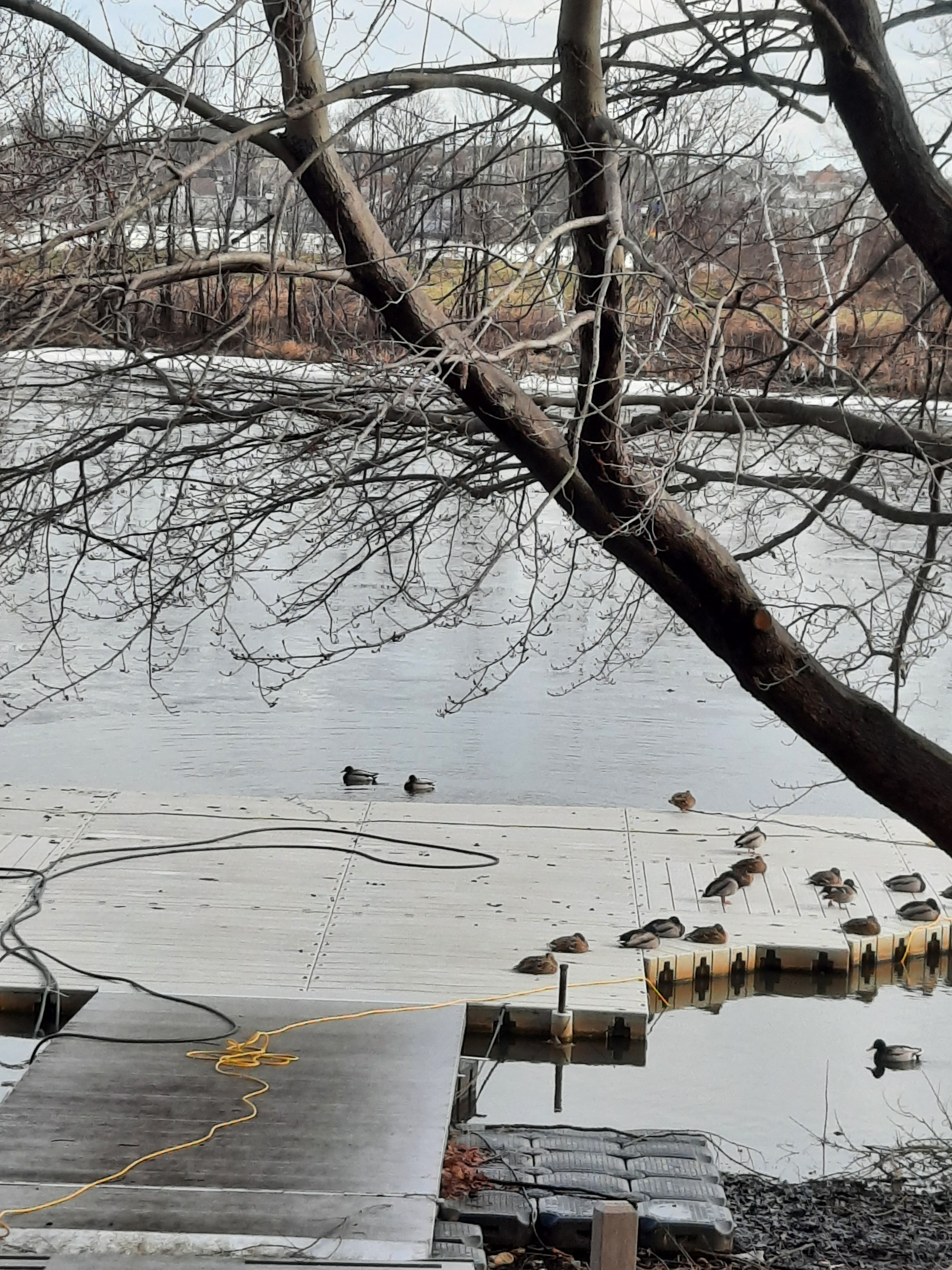
Ducks on the Malden River Tufts Boathouse dock (2023)

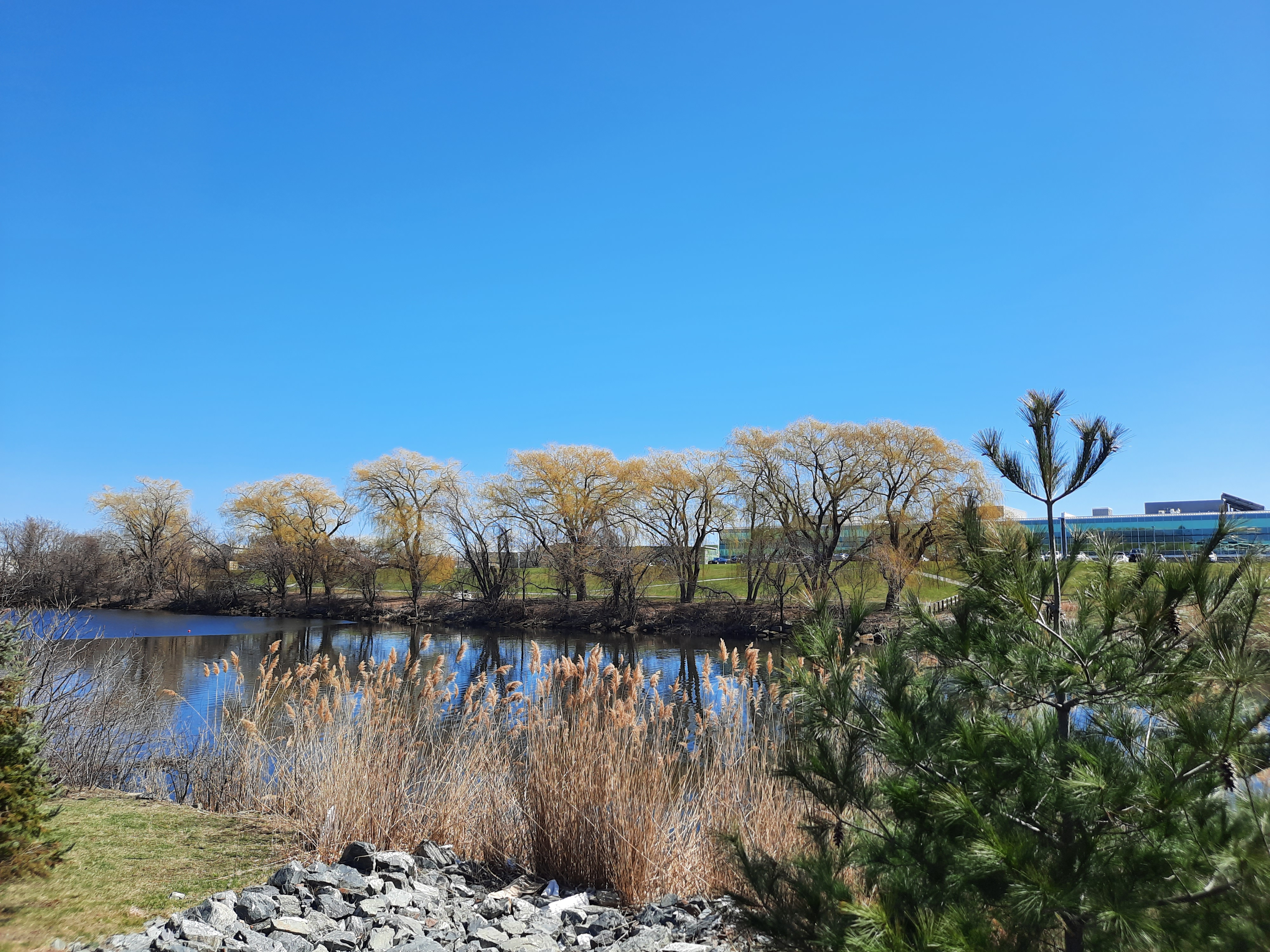
Malden River (April 2024)

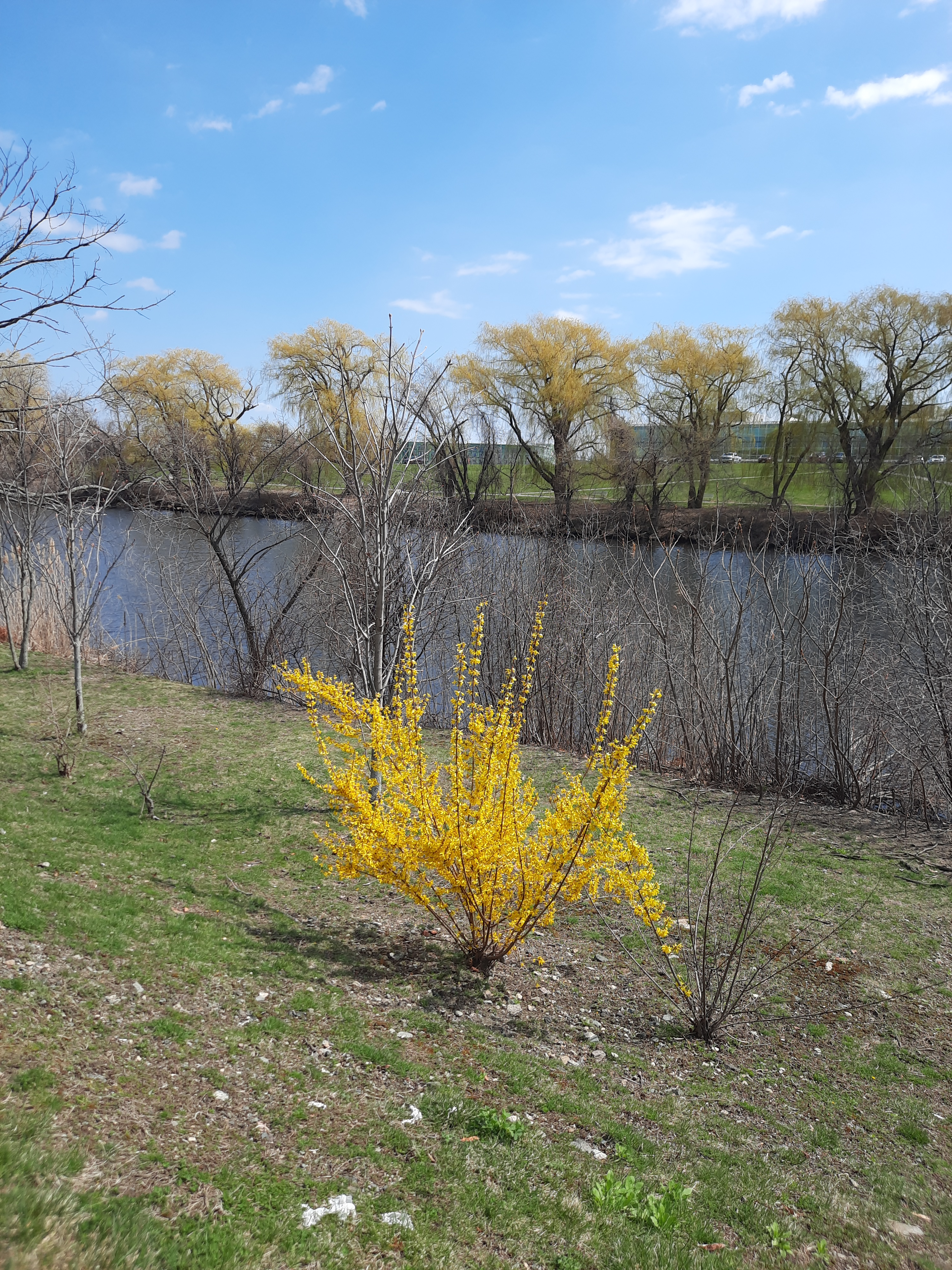
Malden River - Medford MA (April 2024)

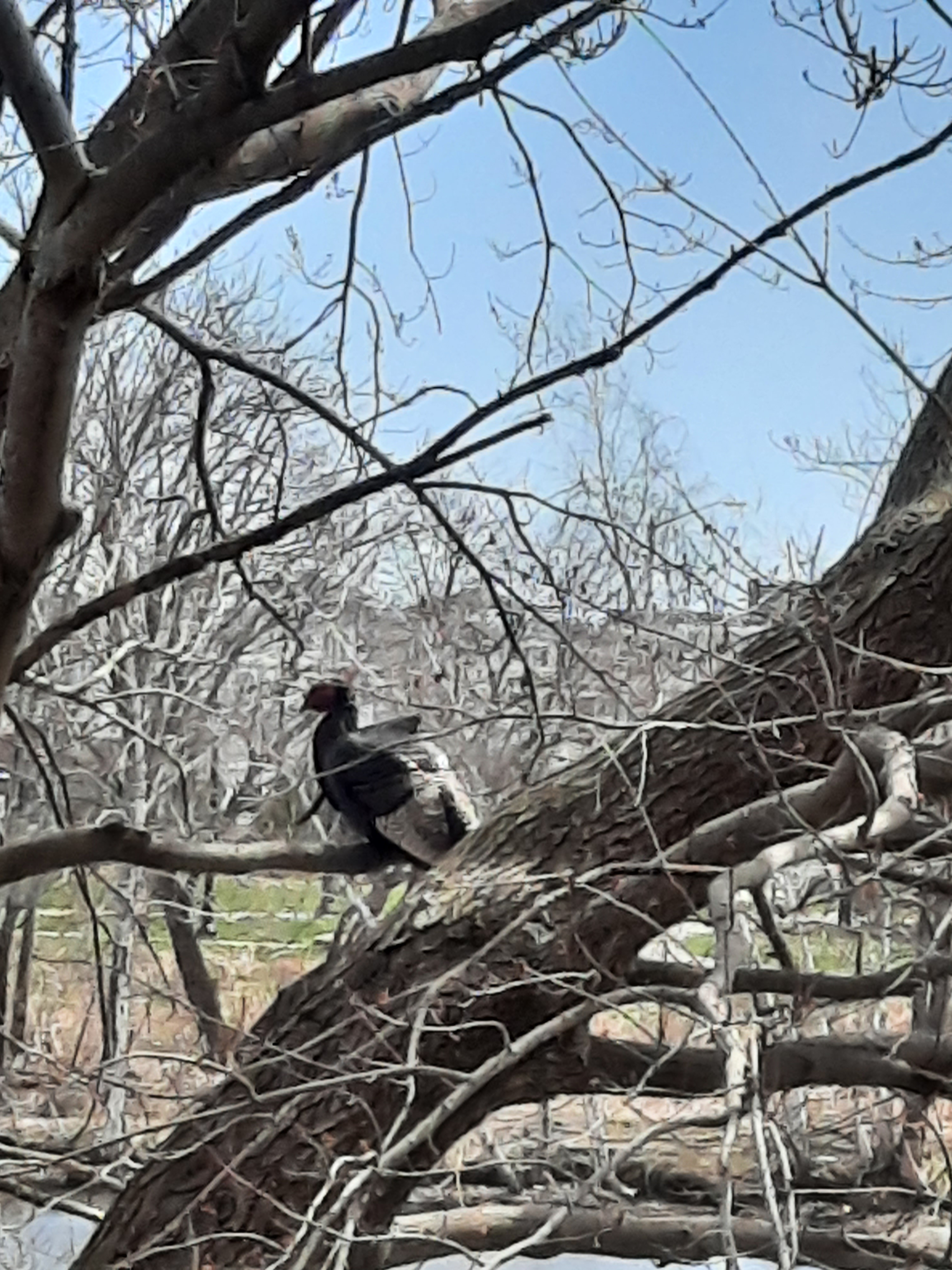
Brant in tree along the Malden River - Medford, MA (April 2024)

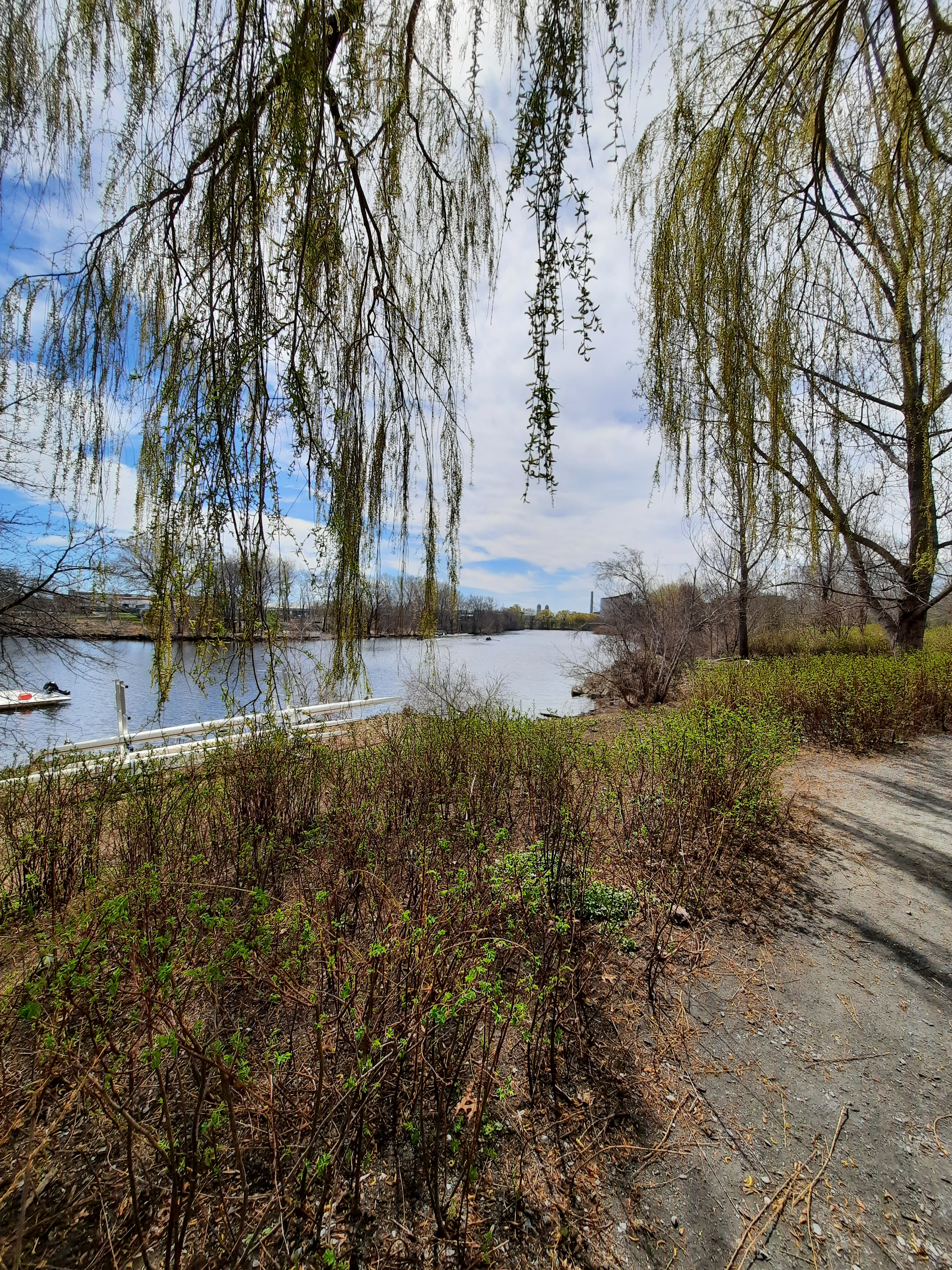
Malden River from Tufts Boat House - Medford, MA (April 2024)

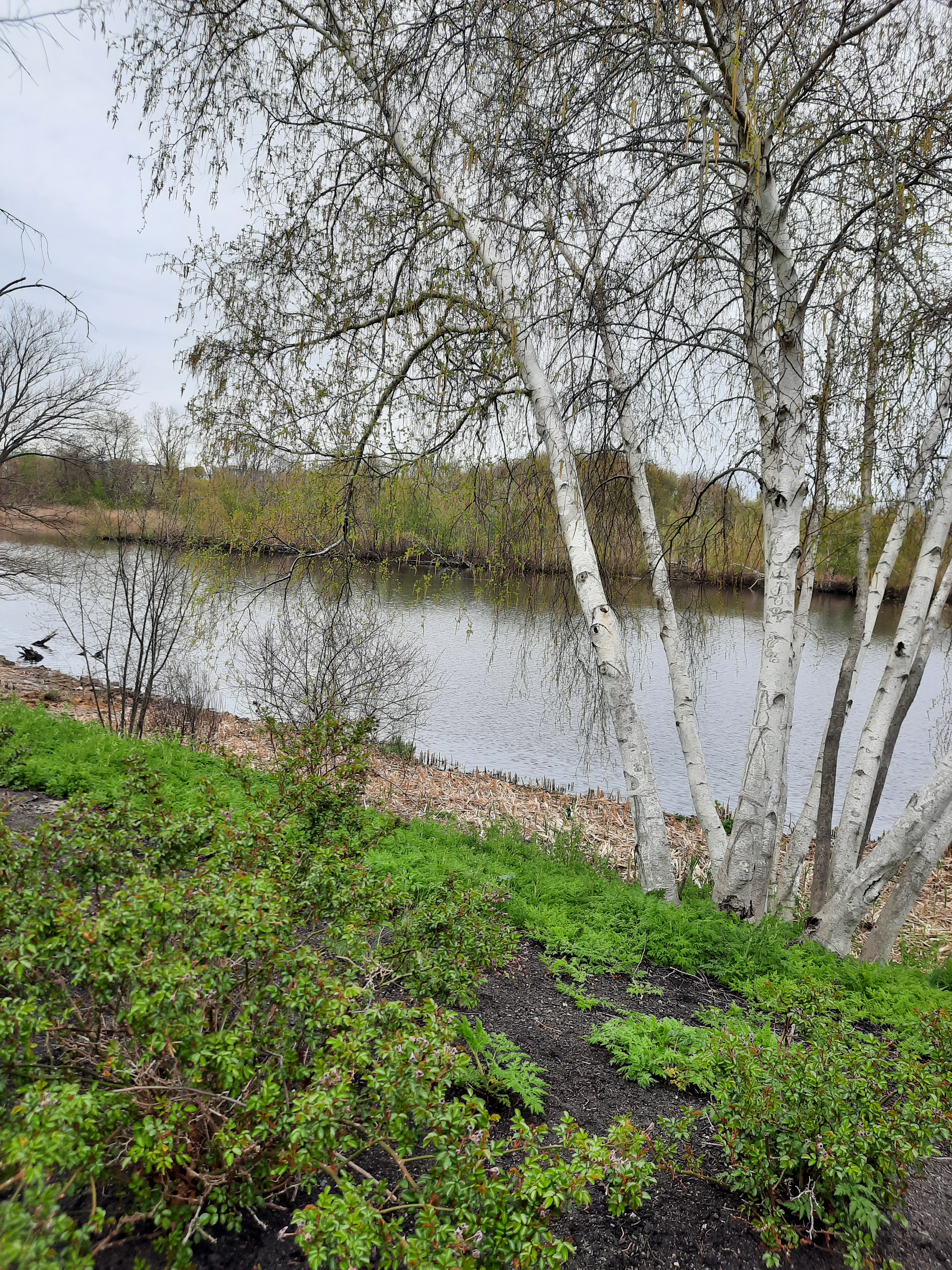
Birch Tree on Malden River (May 2024)

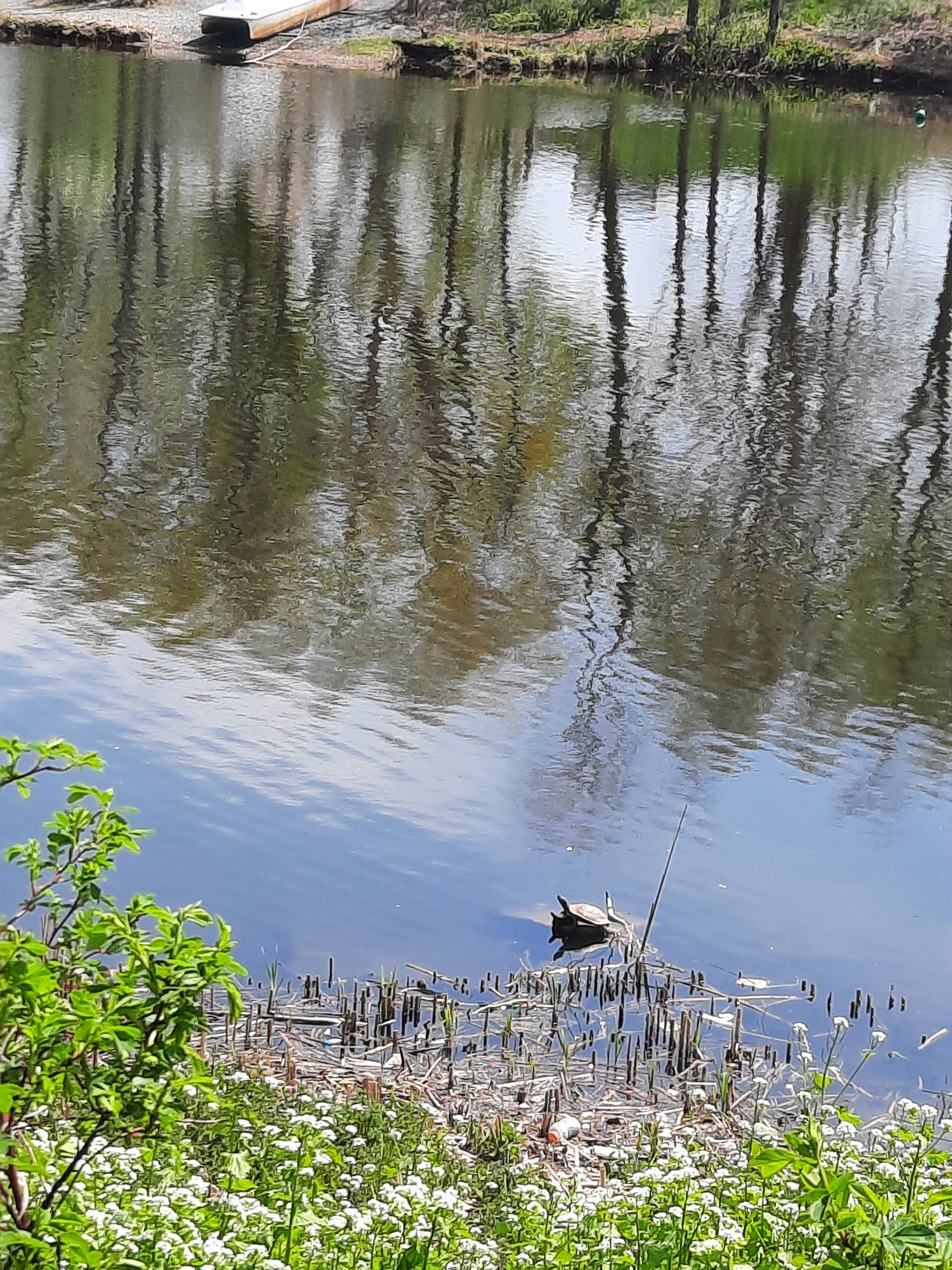
Turtle on Malden River (May 2024)

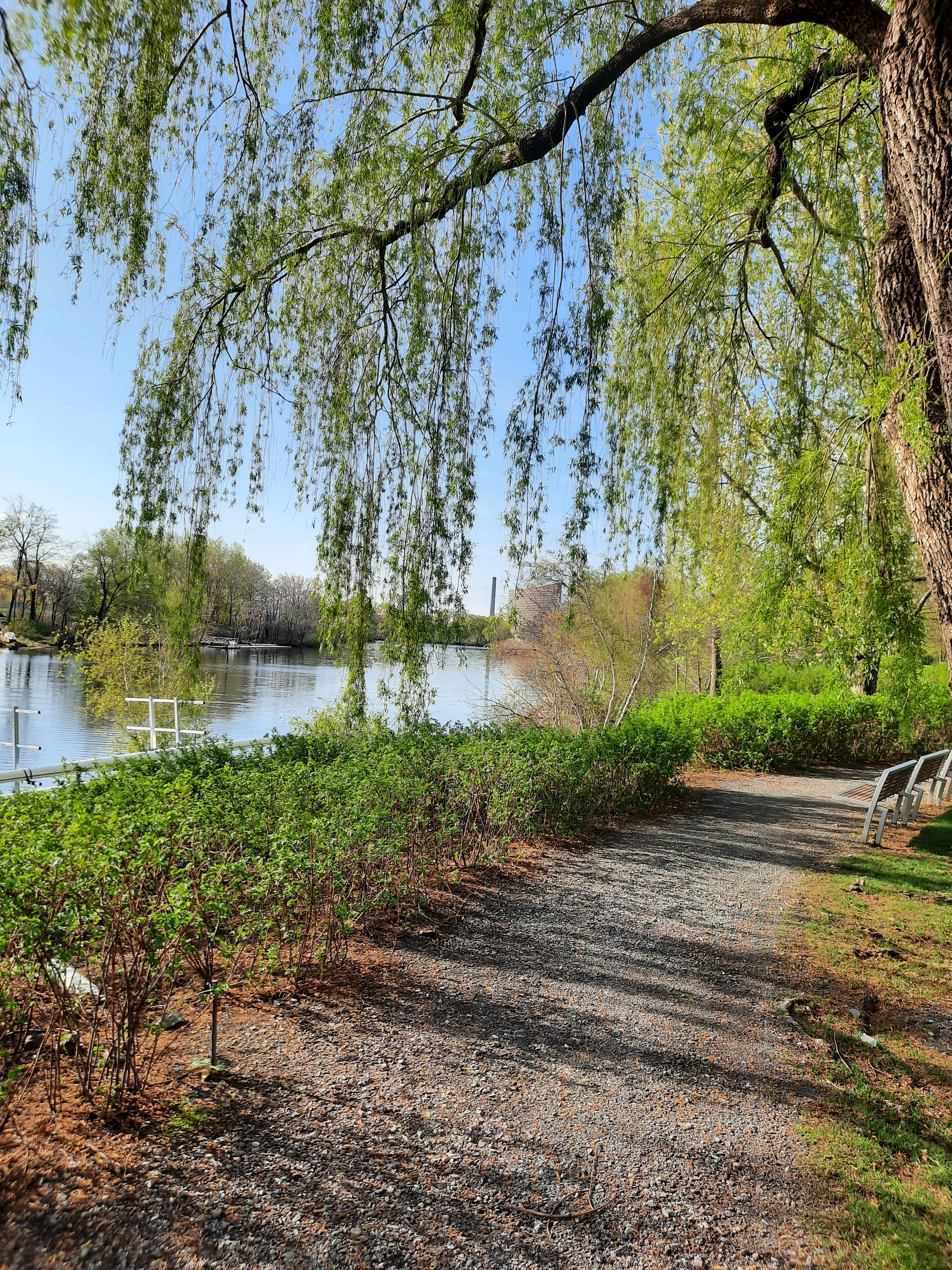
Malden River May 2024

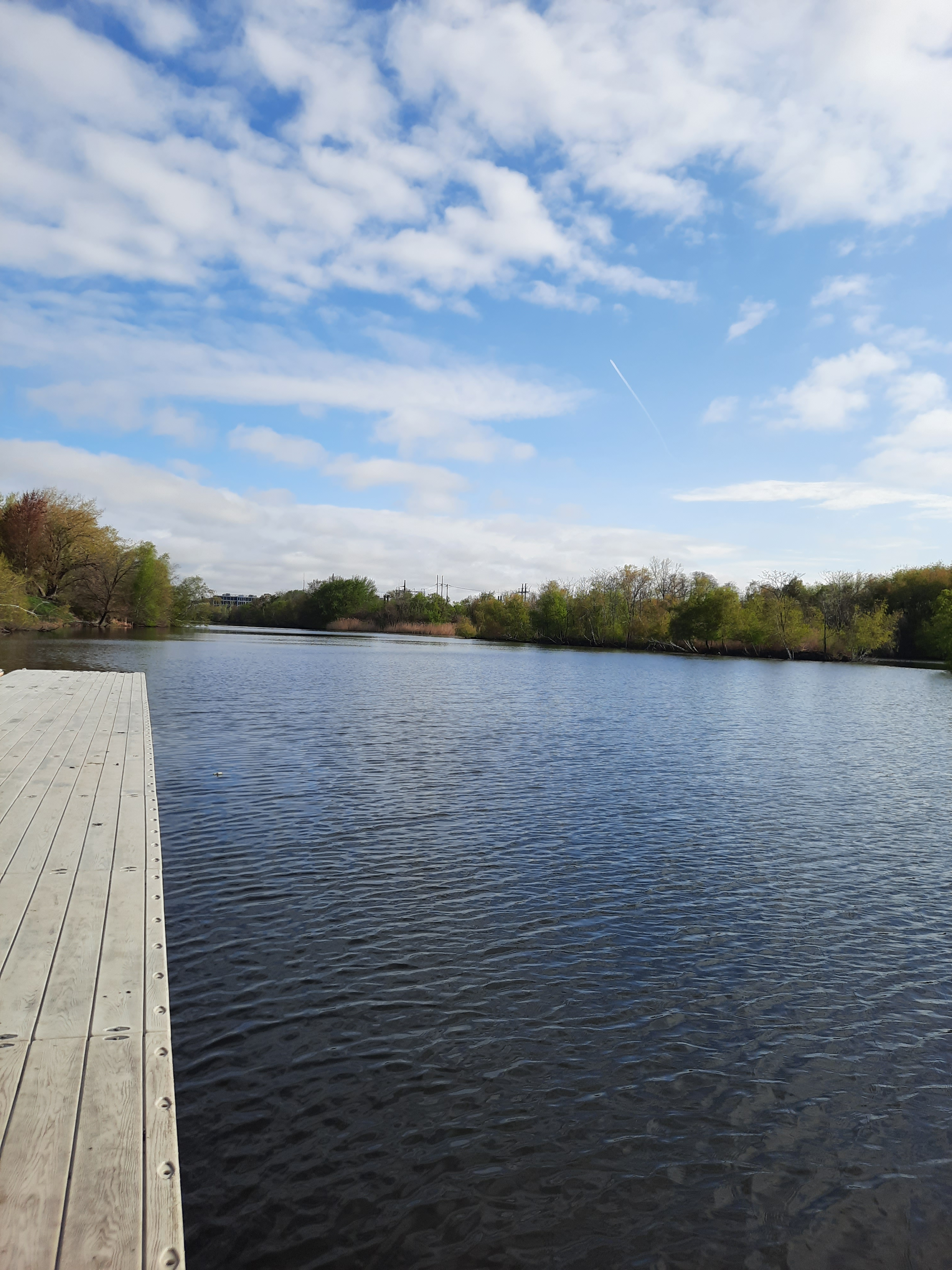
Malden River, Medford MA, May 2024

== Course ==
The above-ground portion of the Malden River starts behind Canal Street in the southwest corner of Malden, where it is fed by three underground canals (described below). It then flows southward for about 2 miles (3.2 km), forming the border between Medford and Everett before emptying into the Mystic River.

== Water quality ==
Like the Mystic River, its waters were once brackish and influenced by the tides. The construction of the Amelia Earhart Dam in 1966 has converted it to freshwater and maintained a fairly constant depth. In 2024 the Environmental Protection Agency plans to begin a Clean Water Act, National Pollutant Discharge Elimination System to address stormwater runoff to help meet the water quality goals of the Mystic River Watershed.

== Dams and locks ==
The Amelia Earhart Dam, situated on the Mystic River below the mouth of the Malden River, converted the Malden River from a brackish, tidal river, to a non-tidal freshwater river when it was constructed in 1966. The dam was more sophisticated than the simple iron gates of the Craddock Locks, which it replaced. It is a permanent concrete structure with three passages to allow boats to pass through. There is a tower where workers observe incoming boats and open the lock accordingly. The dam is equipped with a pump, and is able to pump freshwater downstream even during high tide to prevent flooding. The river flows backwards at times depending on the dam. It was modeled after the Charles River Dam, which is very similar in structure and purpose. Fish passage has been a problem, as there is no working fish ladder there, but workers do leave the locks open at times to allow fish to pass. There is no pedestrian access to the dam.

There are also a set of locks controlling the first canal that leads underground at the beginning of the river. Nothing more than metal barriers lowered by turning a knob, these prevent water from flooding the underground streams in Malden. These locks are very rarely closed. There is a set at the beginning of the canal, and a set at the end, right before the water disappears underground.

== Canals ==
Three canals converge to form the above ground portion of the river, all located on Canal Street. The first canal is a long straight passageway that is divided into two half sections by a concrete divider. It contains the locks mentioned above.

The second canal is a concrete half circle with a bridge over it. It is surprisingly deep at about 230 feet (70 m). This canal is a gathering spot for spawning alewife and the stripers that follow them.

The third canal is structured like the first, except it is much shorter and lacks any locks. This canal is where the actual river continues underground.

== Birds ==
There is a great variety of birds to be seen on the Malden River. Along the river are blue jays, sparrows, swallows, robins, cardinals, crows, mourning doves, pigeons, red-winged blackbirds, eagles, turkey vultures, brants, hawks, grackles, catbirds and woodpeckers. In the water double-crested cormorants, Canada geese, swans, ducks, sea gulls, great blue herons and hooded mergansers can be spotted.

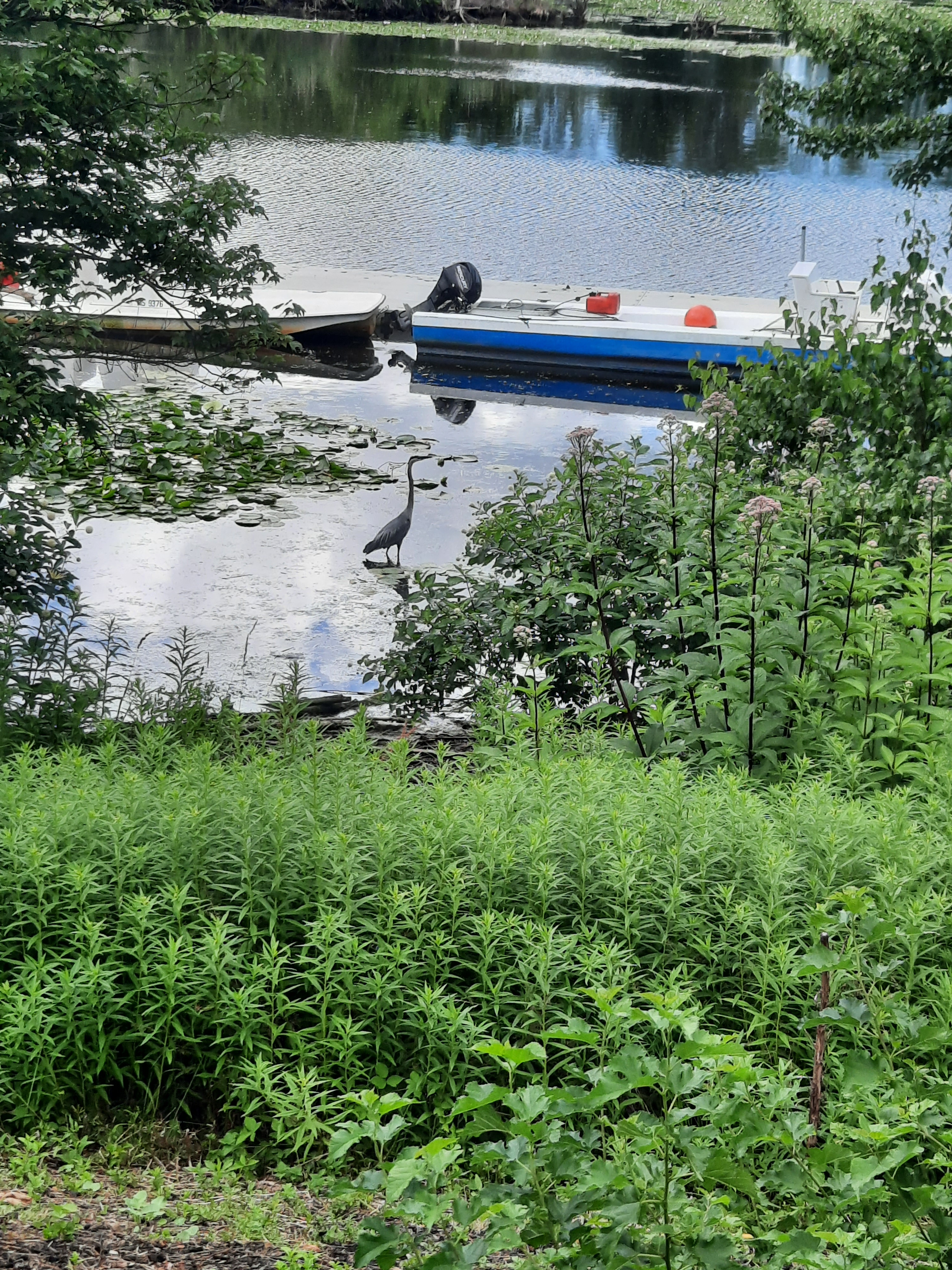
Great Blue Heron Malden River Medford MA July 2024

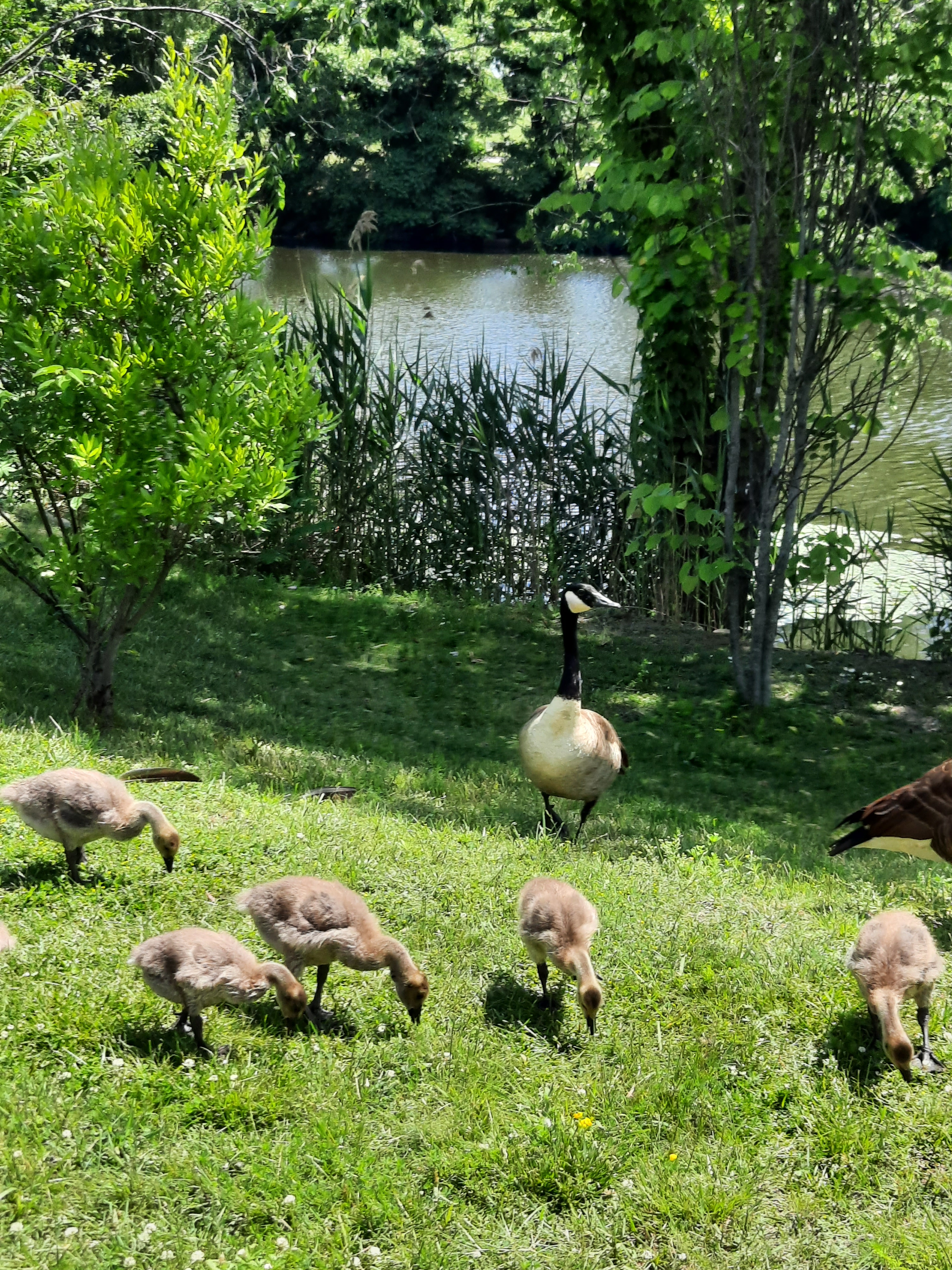
Geese Malden River June 2024

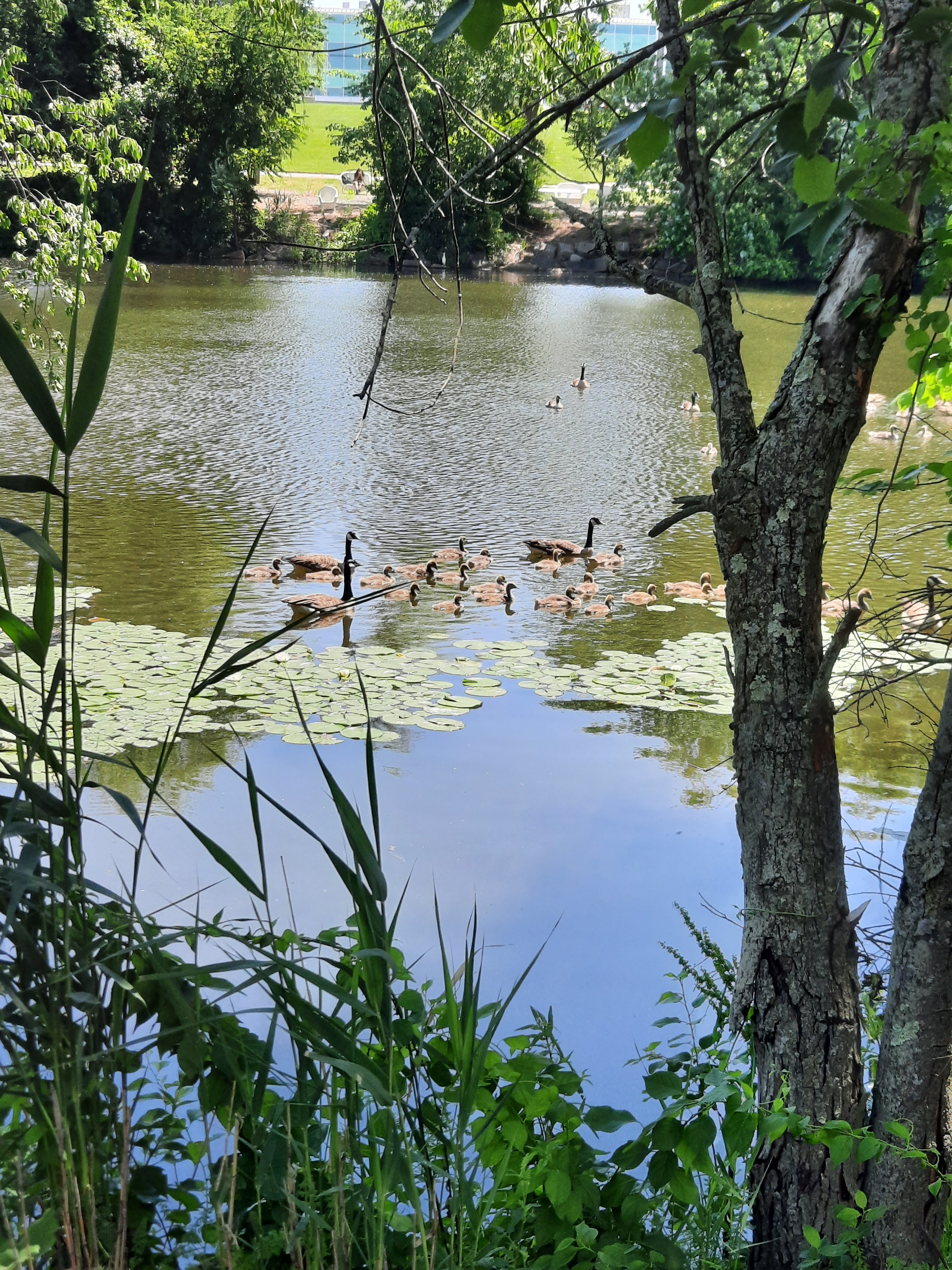
Geese Malden River Medford June 2024

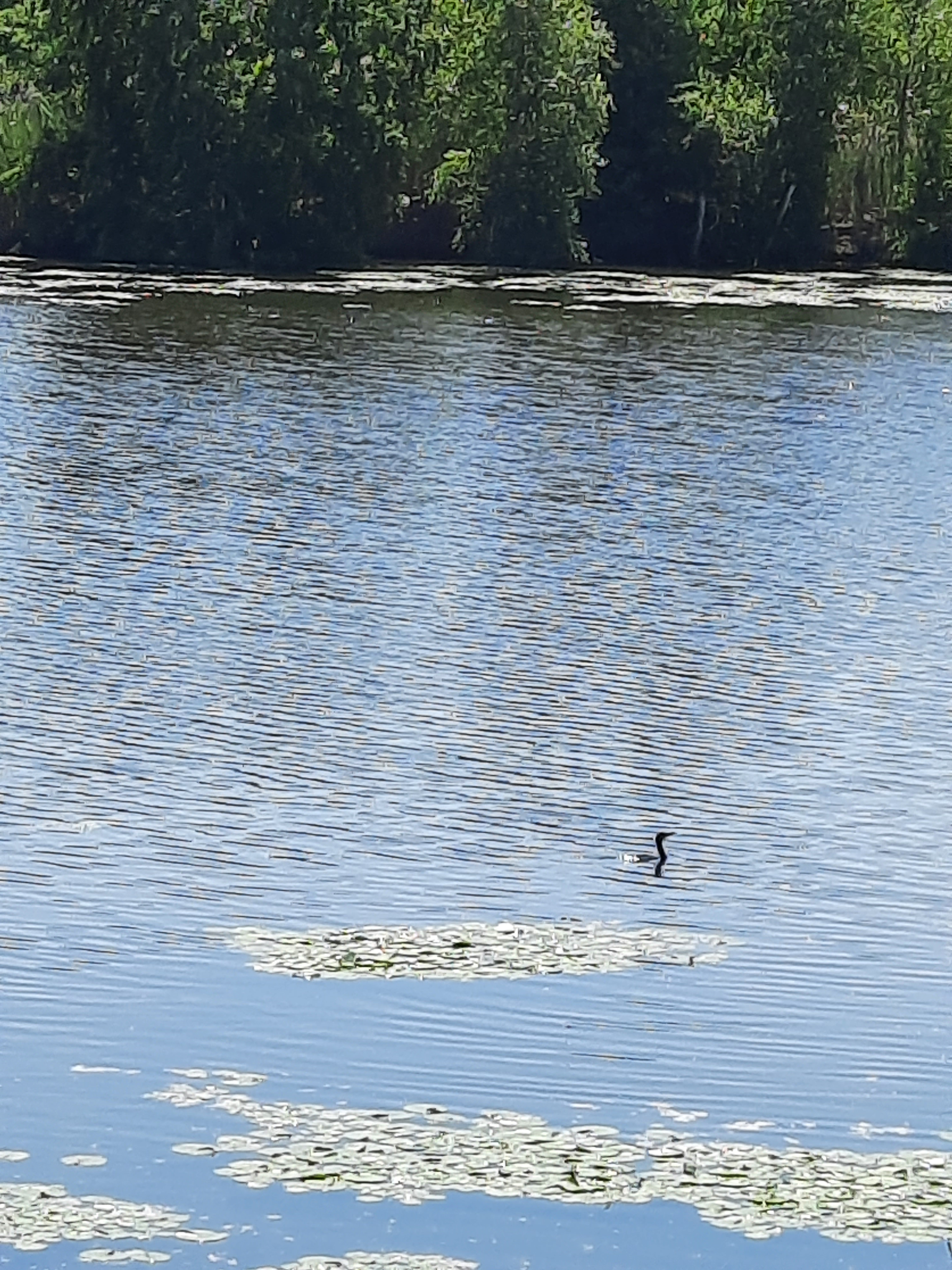
Cormorants Malden River June 2024

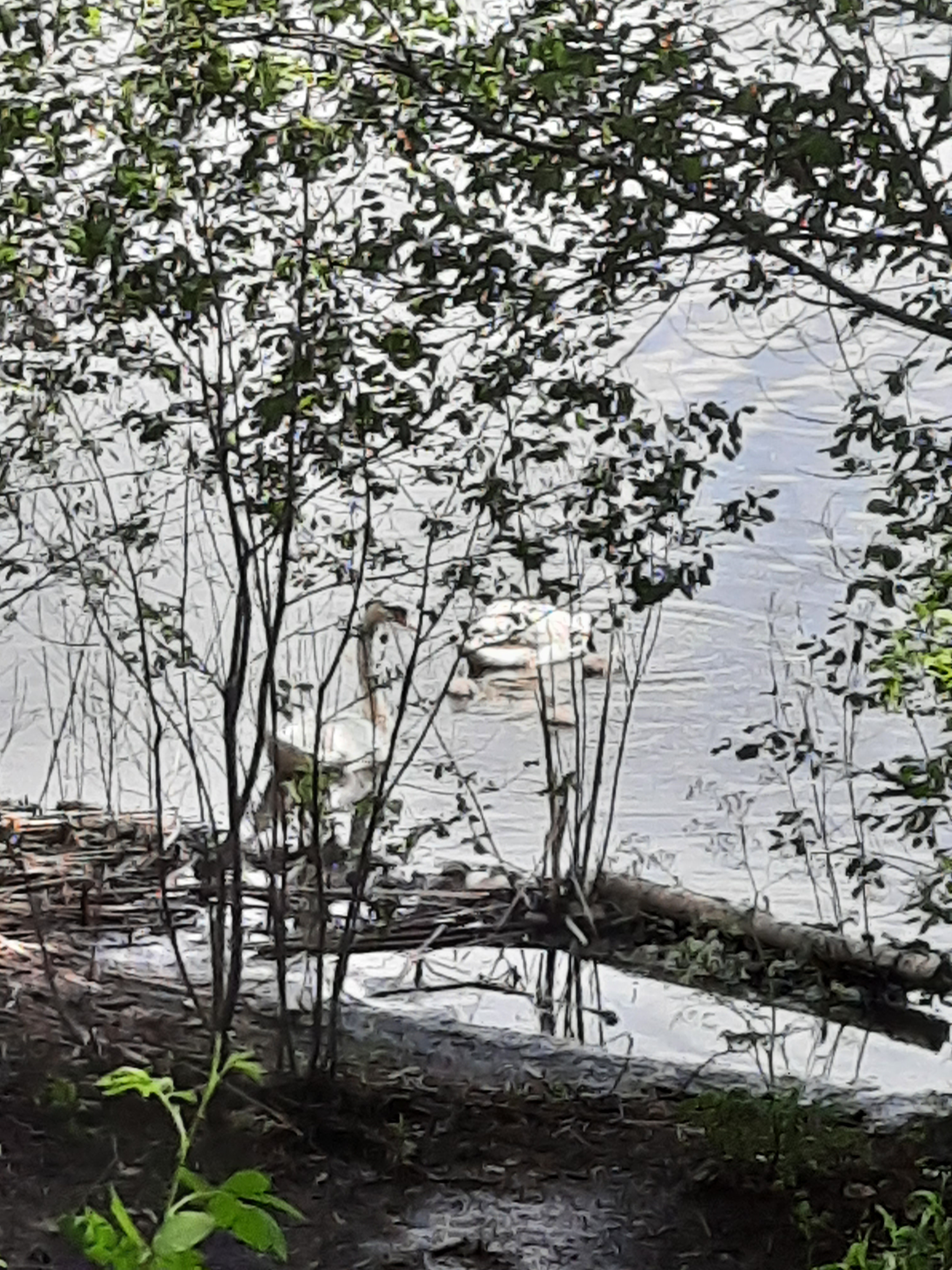
Swans and cygnets Malden River May 2024

== Fish ==
Despite its poor water quality, the Malden River is home to many fish. Most prevalent is the carp, which exists in great numbers and can often be observed basking near the surface. Carp are not native to the Malden River, having been introduced to the river in the 19th century. They have thrived and exist in most waters across the country. Despite their poor reputation as a dirty bottom feeder, they are an excellent sportfish to those who can throw away any preconceived notions about them. They can be caught from the Malden River with simple food baits—such as corn or bread—on the bottom of the river.

Another fish is the alewife and its cousin, the blueback herring, collectively known as river herring or simply herring. Both migrate from the ocean into the fresh water of the Malden River every spring to spawn. Striped bass, a prized saltwater fish, also come in from the ocean to spawn and prey on the herring. Other fish, like bluegill, largemouth bass, and catfish, are less common.

== History ==
Coytemore Lea

The Native Americans and settlers used the Malden River for recreation and commercial purposes. Alewife and blueback herring were once caught in this river with nets and used for consumption. Shipbuilding also occurred along the Malden River.

The Malden River was once a brackish river with salt marshes lining its banks. It was also originally connected to Ell Pond and was fed by Spot Pond Brook, which connected to Spot Pond. The portion of the river before its current beginning, and into which Spot Pond Brook emptied, was sometimes known as Spot and Ell Pond Brook. Others just referred to it as the Malden River. This portion was prone to flooding and contained a few small ponds. Its other sources included several small creeks that have since been covered or replaced by drainage pipes and culverts. One of these creeks flowed along the old Boston and Maine Railroad Saugus Branch tracks and was called B&M. The second one is Townline Brook Canal (aka the rat trails), which now terminates near Broadway. Townline Brook empties into the Pines River now at the Linden end of Malden. One brook called Shilly Shally is west of Washington Street in Melrose and only flows during the spring. It cascades from the Middlesex Fells Reservation in an amazing waterfall only be channeled underground to Spot and Ell Pond Brook.

Further up, at Spot and Ell Pond Brook (near the current Oak Grove MBTA station), there is a tributary that is mostly underground, but appears in Pine Banks Park and Forest Dale Cemetery. Alongside the commuter rail tracks to Wyoming Hill Station in Melrose, the brook is above ground. A small section of Spot Pond Brook is above ground in Stoneham, north of Wyoming Avenue. Spot Pond Brook is entirely above ground in the Fells Reservation.

Near the present-day post office, there is a park called Coytemore Lea. The river once flowed through this park. It was decorated with bridges, waterfalls and flowers. The river has been covered up, but the park still remains.

The Revere Beach Parkway crosses the river on a 1954 bascule bridge, known as the Woods Memorial Bridge, which has not opened for river traffic in over 30 years. MassDOT expects to replace this bridge, which has a 10-ton weight limit, with a fixed span beginning in summer 2014.

== Sports on the river ==
Rowing is a very common sport along the Malden River. There are currently seven teams who use the river for practice and for races. The original team of the Malden River was Tufts University. They started off in a tarp-like tent, but in 2005, they moved into a modern boathouse a little farther down the river. The Malden High School crew team now uses the original Tufts boathouse, while the combined Everett High School - Mystic Valley Charter School team shares a facility on the river's Everett shore with Wentworth Institute of Technology's rowing team. Gentle Giant Rowing Club, whose boathouse on the connected Mystic River also houses the Somerville High School team, also practices on the Malden River, as does Medford High School. Motorboats, canoes, and anglers are also seen; swimming is not common on the river due to a bacteria counts above standards for swimming.
