= Island End River =

Short river between Everett and Chelsea, Massachusetts

Coordinates: 42°23′19″N 71°03′16″W

Location
- Country: United States
- State: Massachusetts

Physical characteristics
- Mouth
  - location: Mystic River

Basin features
- Cities: Everett, Chelsea

Island End River is a short tributary of the Mystic River in Massachusetts. It is notable for its environmental history, which consisted of steady and severe pollution from the 19th century to the 1950s, with concerted cleanup efforts beginning in the early 21st century.

The river was polluted originally through the direct release of wastewater from a coal tar processing plant located along it, resulting in the buildup of polycyclic aromatic hydrocarbons on the river bottom. It was partly dredged in 2007, but its sediments remained heavily contaminated. Its water quality also remained extremely poor, but, as the result of sewage control efforts by the cities of Chelsea and Everett, substantially improved by 2019. Much of the river runs through a culvert, which is in poor condition; the city of Everett began restoring parts of it to the surface in 2021.

Because of the concentration of PAHs in its sediments, Island End River has served as a useful site for scientific studies of microbial biodegradation.
