= The Leavitt Corporation =

American manufacturer of nuts and peanut butter

- Industry: Peanut Butter and Nuts
- Founded: 1925 in Boston, Massachusetts, United States
- Founder: Michael Hintlian
- Headquarters: Everett, Massachusetts, United States
- Area served: International
- Products: Teddie brand peanut butter and River Queen Nuts
- Number of employees: 100~
- Website: teddie.com

The Leavitt Corporation is a manufacturer of nuts and peanut butter, formed by Michael Hintlian in 1925. Its manufacturing facility is in Everett, Massachusetts. Leavitt has about 100 employees.

James T. Hintlian was the CEO in 2007. He was followed by his son, Mark Hintlian.

The company produces Teddie Peanut Butter in several varieties of smoothness, as well as "all natural" and homogenized versions. In 2020, the company introduced "Teddie on the Go", natural peanut butter in a flexible, squeezable package and Teddie branded mixed nuts. In 2004, the River Queen brand had cashews, cashew halves, peanuts, pistachios, almonds, and mixed nut items, available in salted, lightly salted, unsalted, and honey roast varieties.
