= Mystic River =

River in Massachusetts, United States

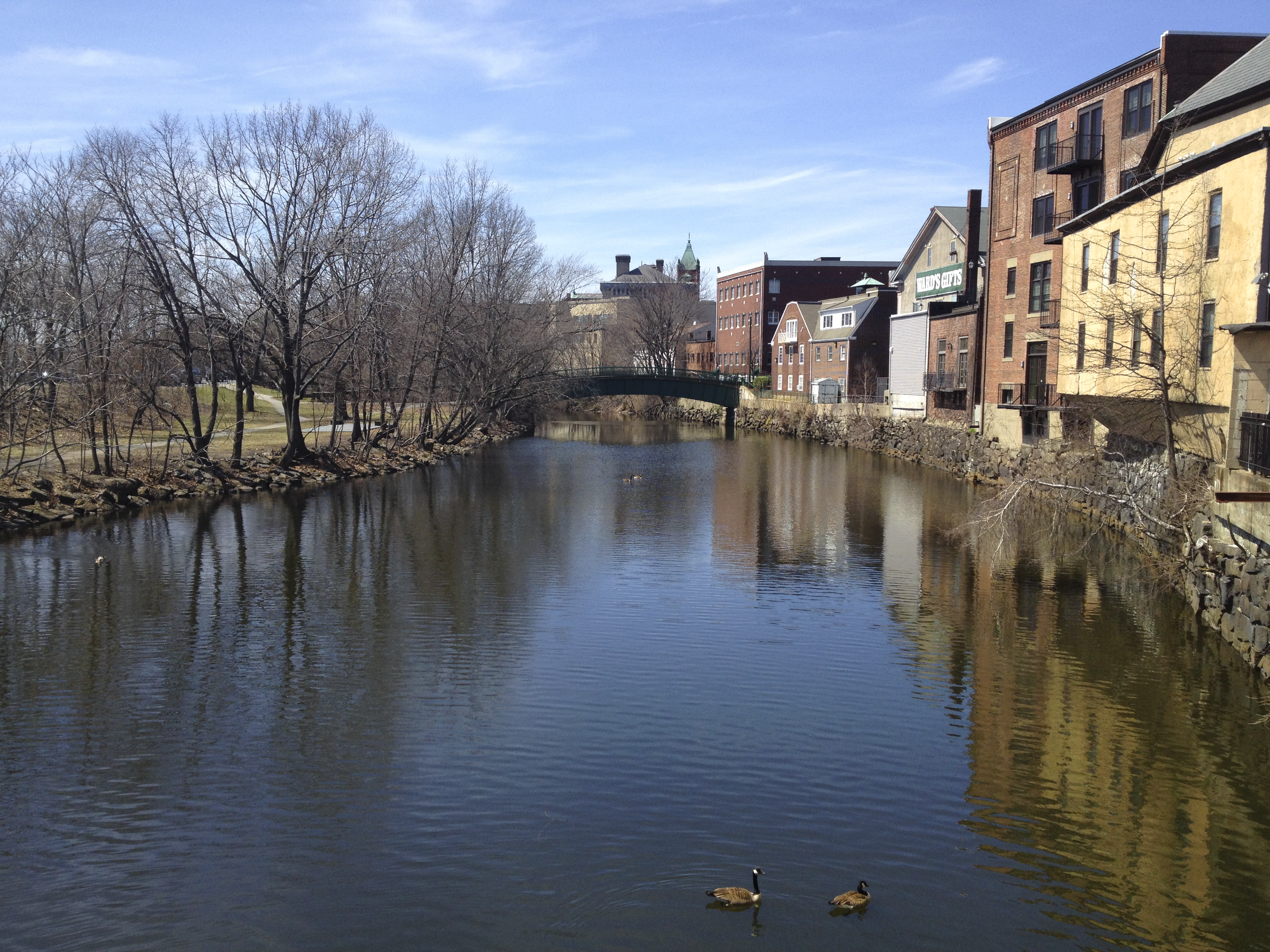
- Mystic River as seen from the Cradock Bridge in Medford
- Interactive map of the Mystic River
- Etymology: from Wampanoag Muhs-uhtuq meaning "big river"

Location
- Country: United States
- State: Massachusetts
- District: Middlesex County
- Municipalities: Charlestown; Chelsea; East Boston; Everett; Somerville; Medford; Arlington

Physical characteristics
- Source: Lower Mystic Lake
- Mouth: Boston Harbor
- Length: 7 mi (11 km), roughly east-west
- Basin size: 76 sq mi (200 km^{2})

Basin features
- Tributaries
  - left: Alewife Brook
  - right: Chelsea Creek, Island End River, Malden River

The Mystic River is a 7.0-mile-long (11.3 km) river in Massachusetts. In the Massachusett language, missi-tuk means "large estuary", alluding to the tidal nature of the Mystic River. The resemblance to the English word mystic is a coincidence, which the colonists followed.

The Mystic River lies to the north of Boston and flows approximately parallel to the lower portions of the Charles River, encompassing 76 square miles (200 km^{2}) of watershed. The river flows from the Lower Mystic Lake and travels through East Boston, Chelsea, Charlestown, Everett, Medford, Somerville, and Arlington. The river joins the Charles River to form inner Boston Harbor. Its watershed contains 44 lakes and ponds, the largest of which is Spot Pond in the Middlesex Fells, with an area of 307 acres (124 ha). Significant portions of the river's shores are within the Mystic River Reservation and are administered by the Massachusetts Department of Conservation and Recreation, which include a variety of recreation areas.

The Mystic River has a long history of industrial use and a continuing water quality problem. Some sections are undergoing an extensive cleanup as part of the construction of Everett's new Encore Boston Harbor casino.

== History ==
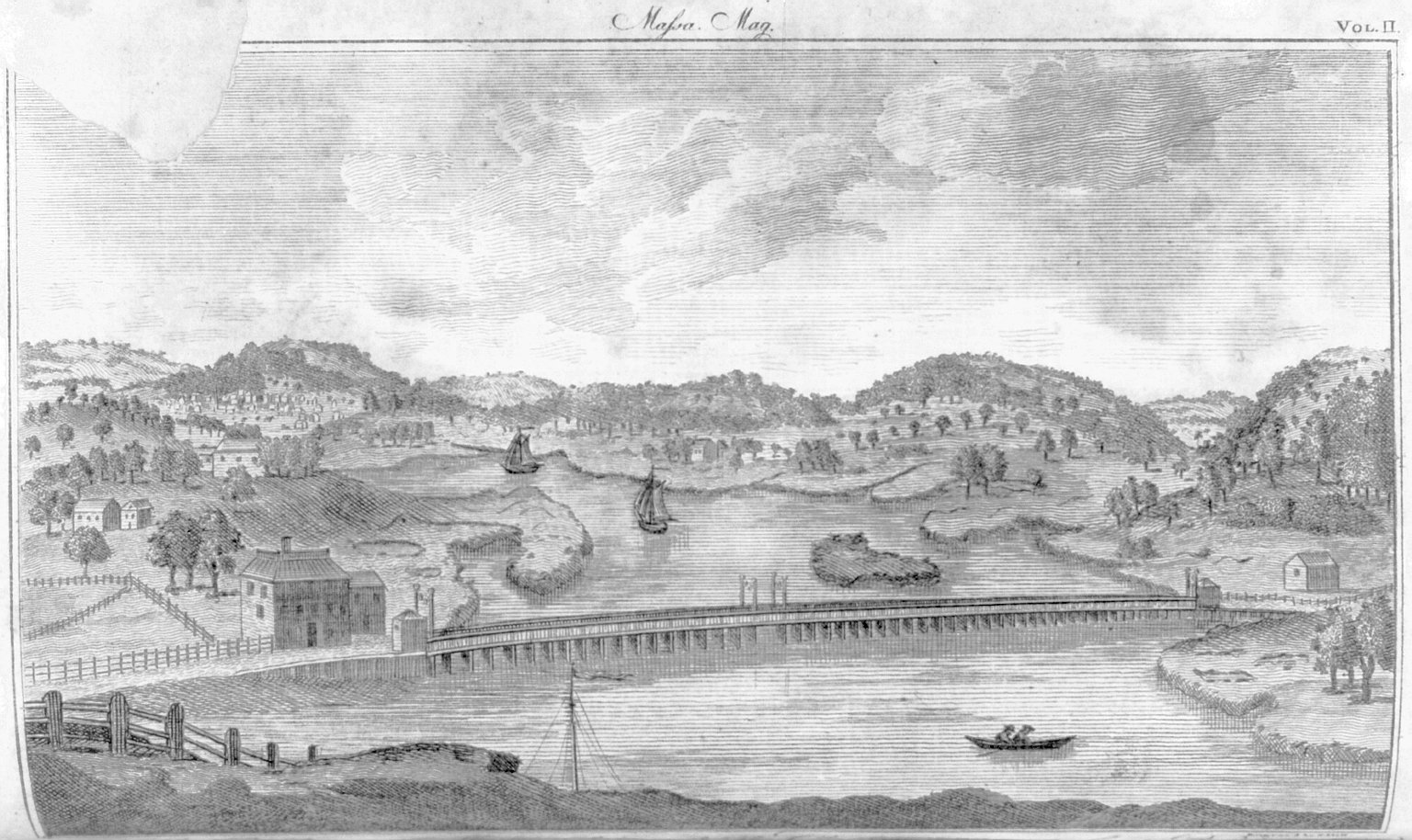
Engraving of the Mystic River and environs in 1790

American Indians and colonists used weirs to catch alewives and fertilize their crops. In 1631, the first ship built in Massachusetts was the Blessing of the Bay, launched from the river's shores. The first bridge was built in 1637; neighboring towns squabbled about the costs for more than a hundred years.

The Mystic River played a role in the American Revolution on September 1, 1774 when a force of roughly 260 British regulars rowed from Boston up the river to a landing point near Winter Hill. From there, they marched about a mile (1.6 km) to the Powder House where a large supply of American gunpowder was kept; they removed all the powder, sparking a popular uprising known as the Powder Alarm. The Battle of Chelsea Creek took place in the river's watershed in May 1775, and the British attacked via the river's beach in the Battle of Bunker Hill in June.

In 1805, the Middlesex Canal linked the Charles and Mystic Rivers to the Merrimack River in Lowell. Ten shipyards along the Mystic River built more than 500 clipper ships during the 19th Century. Shipbuilding peaked in the 1840s, as schooners and sloops transported timber and molasses for rum distilleries between Medford and the West Indies.

Extensive salt marshes lined the banks of the Mystic River until 1909, when the first Craddock Locks was built across the river, converting salt marsh to freshwater marsh and enabling development. The Amelia Earhart Dam was built in 1966, named for Amelia Earhart. In 1950, construction was completed on the Maurice J. Tobin Bridge which spans the Mystic River, joining Charlestown and Chelsea.

== Wildlife ==
At one time, the Mystic River was home to many species of fish, including salmon, alewife, blueback herring, striped bass, bluefish, smallmouth bass, largemouth bass, bluegill, carp and more. Although most of these species still live in the Mystic River, pollution and dam building have severely damaged the populations. Pollution came from various mills and a small ship building yard in the past. The main source of pollution in the 20th century and into the present is from drainage from cities and towns in the watershed. Many of the records of nearby drainage pipes have been lost, or have undocumented changes and diversions. Once described as having so many herring that one could cross the river on their backs, the Mystic River herring run is much smaller than it was in historic times. Pollution has raised bacteria levels and turbidity, making it unfavorable for fish to live in.

== In popular culture ==
In 1844, Medford abolitionist and writer Lydia Maria Child described her journey across the Mystic to her grandfather's house in the poem "Over the River and Through the Wood." (Grandfather's House, restored by Tufts University in 1976, still stands near the river on South Street in Medford.)

John Townsend Trowbridge's popular 1882 novel, The Tinkham Brothers' Tide-Mill, had its setting along the river at a time when saltwater still reached the Mystic Lakes.

In Dennis Lehane's novel of the same name, Boston-area Mystic River holds a pivotal narrative development in the mystery. Later, Clint Eastwood directed the acclaimed film adaptation.

In the 1861 poem "Paul Revere's Ride" by Henry Wadsworth Longfellow, Paul Revere rides along the banks of the Mystic River.

== Crossings ==
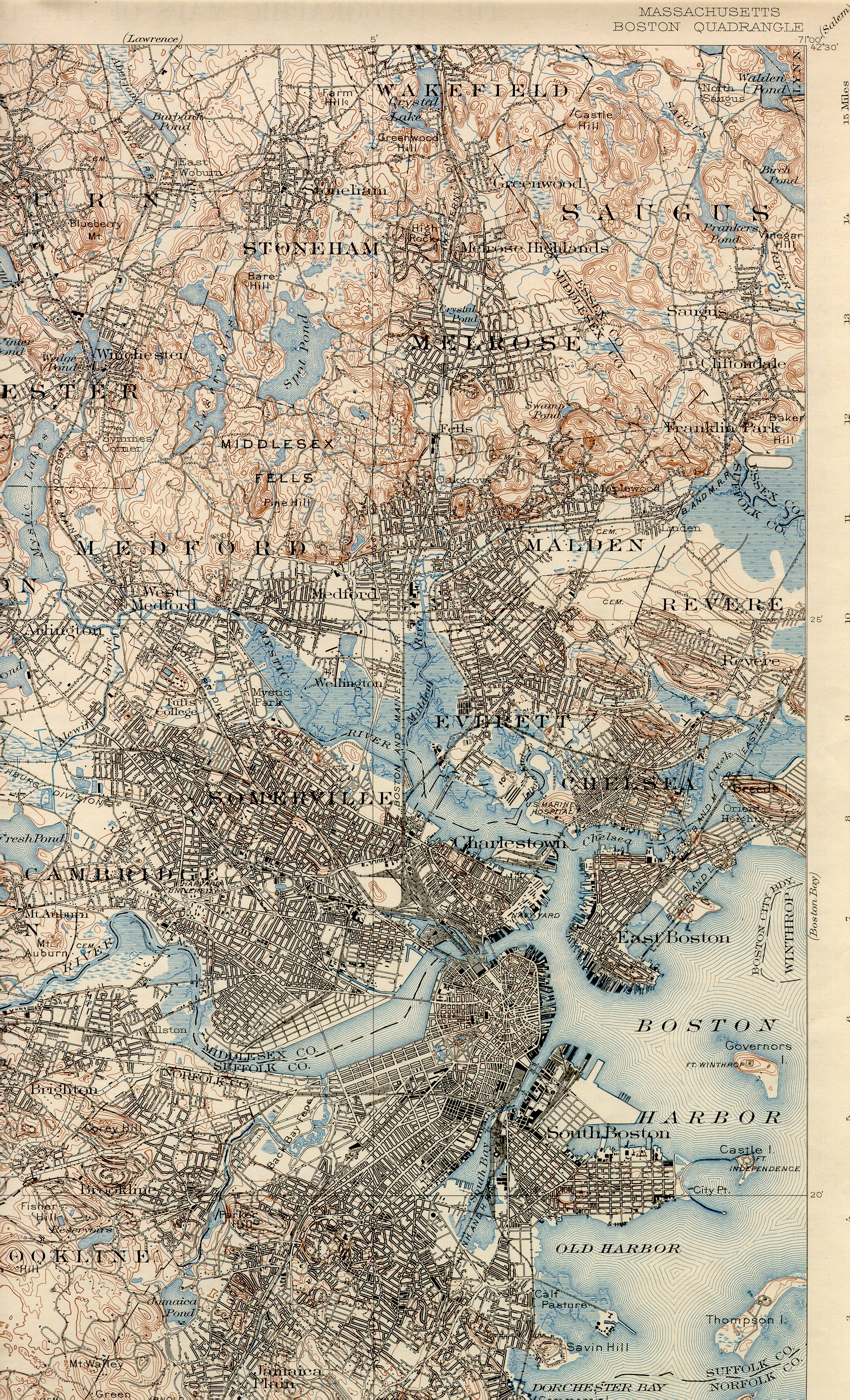
A 1903 USGS map of the Mystic River and environs

Crossing	Carries	Location	Built	Coordinates
Tobin Bridge	Northeast Expressway	Charlestown to Chelsea	1950	42°23′05″N 71°02′51″W
Malden Bridge	Alford Street	Charlestown to Everett	1963 (restored 2010–2014)	42°23′20″N 71°04′17″W
	MBTA Newburyport/Rockport; Commuter Rail	Somerville to Everett	Original 1849 by Grand Junction Railroad?	42°23′35″N 71°04′28″W
Amelia Earhart Dam	No public access	Somerville to Everett	1966	42°23′42″N 71°04′30″W
	MBTA Haverhill/Reading; Commuter Rail and MBTA Orange Line	Somerville to Medford	Replaced in 1975 when Orange Line was constructed?	42°23′48″N 71°04′38″W
Wellington Bridge	Fellsway	Somerville to Medford	1935, reconstructed 1979	42°23′59″N 71°05′01″W
	Mystic Valley Parkway	Medford	1988	42°24′21″N 71°05′47″W
	Interstate 93	Medford		42°24′53″N 71°06′14″W
Cradock Bridge	Main St	Medford		42°25′03″N 71°06′37″W
Medford Pipe Bridge	Pedestrians, piped water	Medford	1897	42°25′6″N 71°6′44″W
	Mystic Valley Parkway	Medford	1906 (functionally obsolete)	42°25′05″N 71°06′45″W
	Winthrop Street	Medford		42°25′04″N 71°07′05″W
	Mystic Valley Parkway	Medford	1906	42°25′05″N 71°07′36″W
	MBTA Lowell Commuter Rail	Somerville to Medford	Original in 1835? (Boston and Lowell Railroad)	42°25′04″N 71°07′43″W
	Boston Avenue	Somerville to Medford	Former site of Middlesex Canal crossing	42°25′02″N 71°07′49″W
	River Street / Harvard Avenue	Arlington to Medford		42°24′56″N 71°08′18″W
	Medford Street / High Street	Arlington to Medford		42°25′14″N 71°08′34″W

== See also ==
- Mystic River Jewish Project
