= Amelia Earhart Dam =

Dam in Massachusetts, United States

Coordinates: 42°23′42″N 71°04′30″W

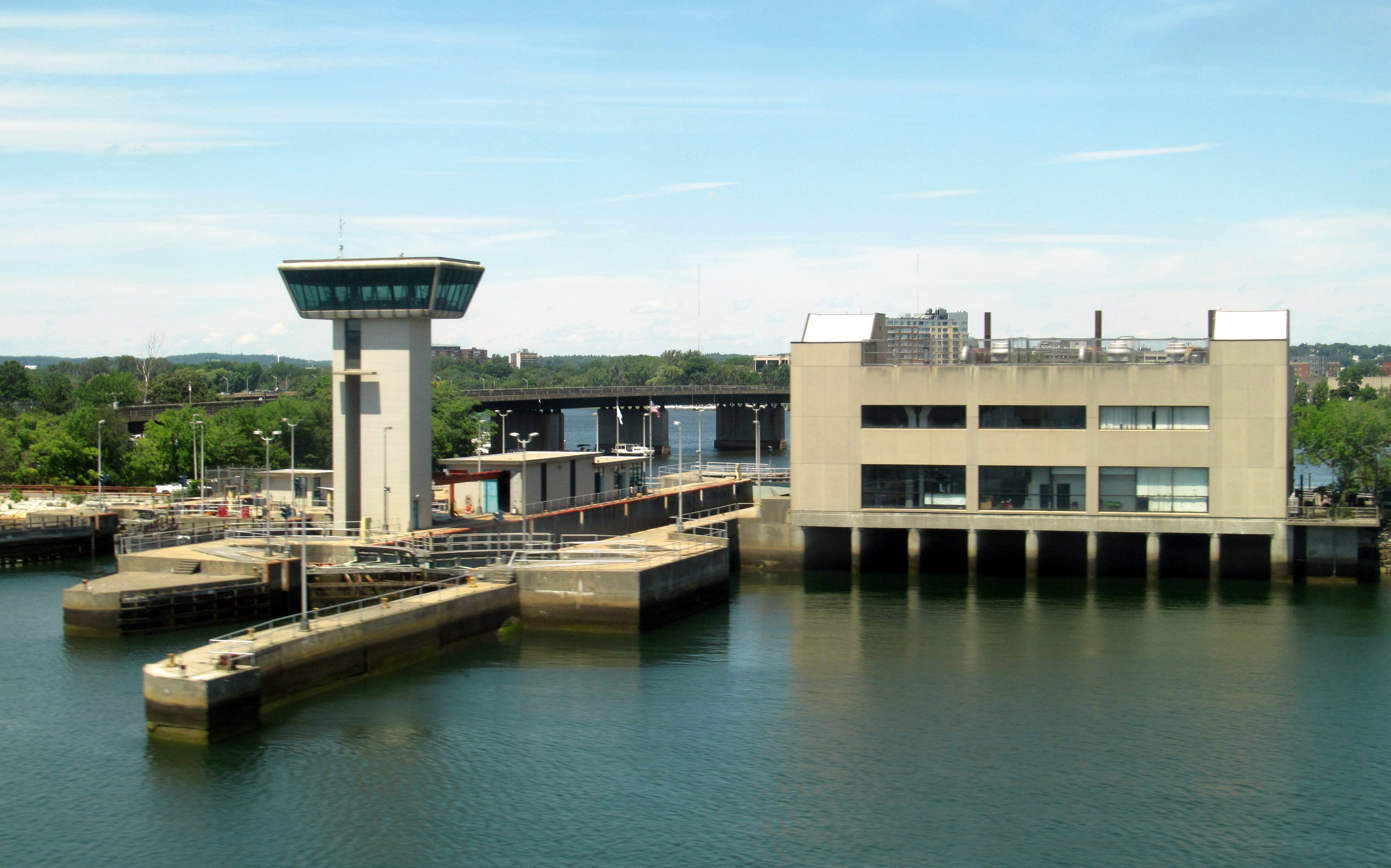
Amelia Earhart Dam in July 2016

The Amelia Earhart Dam is an earth-fill dam spanning the Mystic River near its mouth between Somerville and Everett, Massachusetts. It was built in 1966 to regulate tidal effects and the incursion of salt water in the upstream river basin. The dam is named after the aviation pioneer Amelia Earhart whose plane disappeared in 1937. Earhart lived in nearby Medford, Massachusetts in the 1920s. There is no public access to the dam.

== Technical Details ==
The Amelia Earhart Dam has 3 locks for marine traffic, the largest is 325 feet long, and 45 feet wide; the two smaller locks are 120 feet long and, 22 feet wide. It is equipped with pumps to push fresh water out to the harbor even during high tide.

== Fish passage ==
Four dams play a role in the passage of fish into the Mystic River system. The Amelia Earhart Dam is the first and the largest, but it is not considered the main obstacle for the passage of fish like river herring because dam operations guarantee that fish can pass through at low tide and when the locks open.

== History ==
The Amelia Earhart Dam replaced the Craddock Locks in the city of Medford. The Craddock Locks were built in 1909 to prevent excess floodwaters from engulfing the city, Remnants of the locks can be seen under the Cradock Bridge.

The 1966 construction of the dam opened more land along the Mystic River for development, as it stabilized water levels and prevented saltwater intrusion.

The City of Somerville's 2017 Climate Change Vulnerability Assessment noted that by 2035, a 100-year flood would flank the dam, and by 2070, overtop it, leading to major impacts on low-lying areas such as Assembly Square.

In January 2018, a nor'easter caused slushy coastal flooding in downtown Boston and the Seaport district, alarming local officials. In March 2018, a storm caused minor flooding in Draw Seven Park, and ocean water nearly overtopped the dam. In November 2018, 21 cities and towns near the Mystic River requested flood prevention and mitigation funding, including approximately $20 million for an additional pump.

== Planned improvements ==
Overtopping of the dam by a storm surge could flood thousands of buildings, and parts of the MBTA Orange Line and Interstate 93.

The Massachusetts Department of Conservation and Recreation (DCR) announced an investment of $28 million to improve climate resiliency and provide significant flood protection for the environmental justice communities surrounding the Amelia Earhart Dam (AED) on the Mystic River between Somerville and Everett and Draw Seven Park in Somerville. The projects are funded through the American Rescue Plan Act (ARPA). The improvements include $13 million to redesign the elevation of the dam and $15 million for the renovation of Draw Seven Park including construction of a flood control berm to prevent coastal flooding.
