= Everett, Massachusetts =

- City
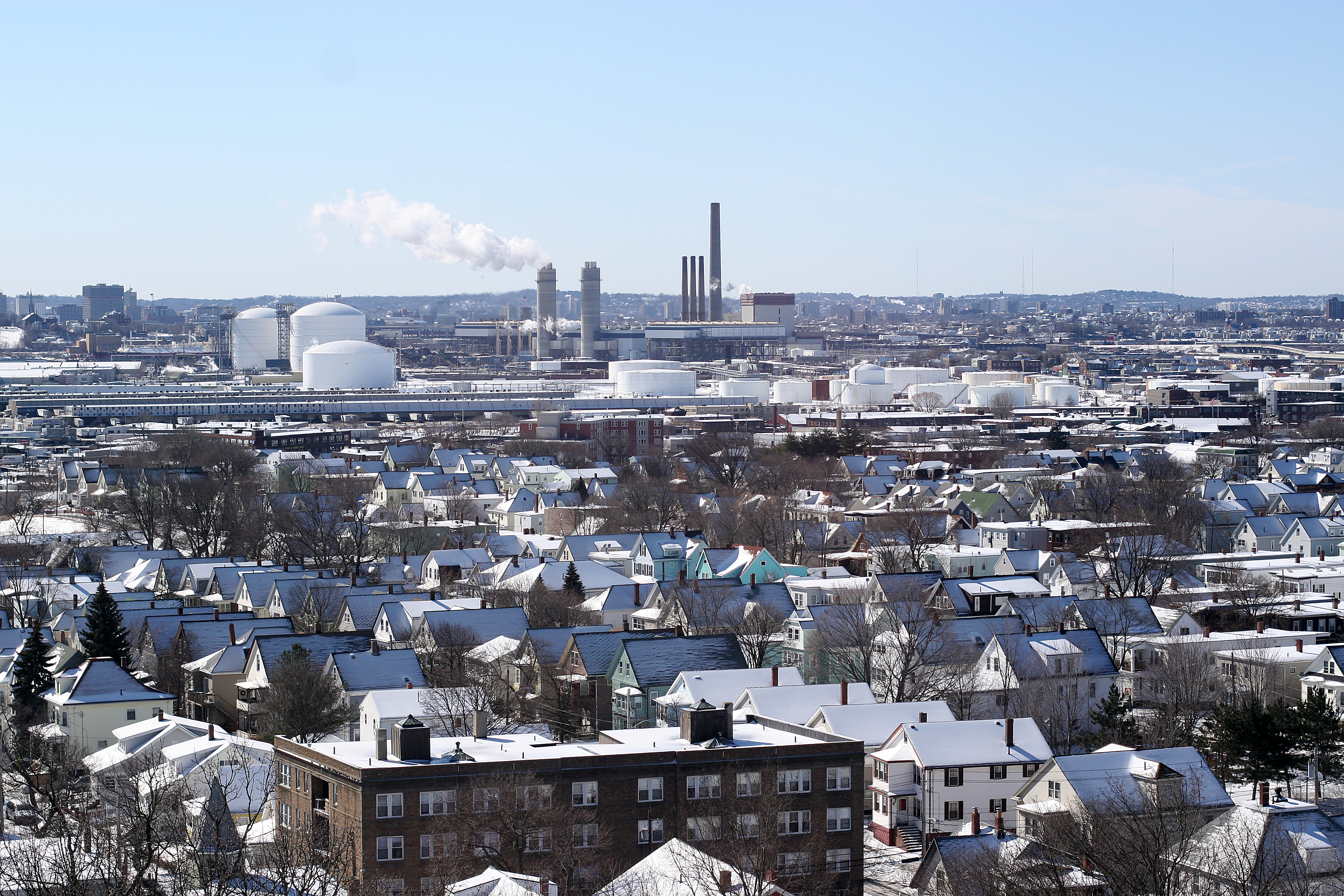
- Aerial view of Everett, looking towards the Mystic Generating Station

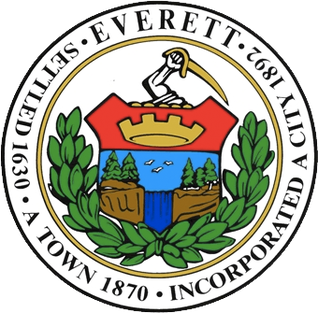
- Flag Seal
- Motto(s): "City of Pride, Progress, and Possibilities"
- Location in Middlesex County in Massachusetts

- Location in the United States
- Coordinates: 42°24′30″N 71°03′15″W
- Country: United States
- State: Massachusetts
- County: Middlesex
- Settled: 1630
- Incorporated: 1870
- City: 1892

Government
  - Type: Mayor-council city
  - Mayor: Robert Van Campen

Area
  - Total: 3.66 sq mi (9.48 km^{2})
  - Land: 3.42 sq mi (8.85 km^{2})
  - Water: 0.25 sq mi (0.64 km^{2})
- Elevation: 9.8 ft (3 m)

Population (2020)
  - Total: 49,075
  - Density: 14,364.4/sq mi (5,546.12/km^{2})
- Time zone: UTC−5 (EST)
  - Summer (DST): UTC−4 (EST)
- ZIP code: 02149
- Area code: 617 / 857
- FIPS code: 25-21990
- GNIS feature ID: 0612739
- Website: cityofeverett.com

Everett is a city in Middlesex County, Massachusetts, United States, directly north of Boston, bordering the neighborhood of Charlestown. The population was 49,075 at the time of the 2020 United States census.

Everett was the last city in the United States to have a bicameral legislature, which was composed of a seven-member Board of Aldermen and an eighteen-member Common Council. On November 8, 2011, the voters approved a new City Charter that changed the City Council to a unicameral body with eleven members – six ward councilors and five councilors-at-large. The new City Council was elected during the 2013 City Election.

== History ==
Everett was originally part of Charlestown, and later Malden. It separated from Malden in 1870. The community was named after Edward Everett, who served as U.S. Representative, U.S. Senator, the 15th Governor of Massachusetts, Minister to Great Britain, and United States Secretary of State. He also served as President of Harvard University.

In 1892, Everett was upgraded from a town to a city. On December 13, 1892, Alonzo H. Evans defeated George E. Smith to become Everett's first mayor. Landfill has expanded the Everett shoreline over the centuries. At some point between 1905 and 1912, it connected the mainland to what was formerly White Island in the Mystic River. The bridge of the Grand Junction Railroad was originally built using this island for part of the crossing.

In 1919, Beacon Oil began construction of an oil refinery and storage yard near the Mystic River, opening in 1920. In its first decade, the facility experienced five major explosions or fires. In 1929, Beacon Oil was purchased by Standard Oil of New Jersey, also known as Esso and now known as ExxonMobil. The refinery shut down in 1965 due to lack of profitability, but the tank storage remained.

In 1971, Distrigas of Massachusetts began importing liquefied natural gas (LNG) at its Everett Marine Terminal in the Island End section of Everett. This terminal was the first of its kind in the country. It was purchased by GDF Suez North America, and as of 2013, supplied 20% of New England's natural gas demand from its two tanks with a combined capacity of 3,400,000,000 cu ft (96,000,000 m^{3}), equal to approximately one day of Massachusetts gas demand. In 2019, it was purchased by Constellation Energy, at the time a subsidiary of Exelon. As of 2023, it receives 99% of LNG imports into the United States, mostly from Algeria and Trinidad. LNG is trucked to other storage sites around the state or heated to gas form and transferred by pipeline.

On September 16, 2014, the Massachusetts Gaming Commission voted to approve Wynn Resorts' proposal for a $1.6 billion casino to be located on a 33-acre site on the Mystic River in Everett. The casino, named Encore Boston Harbor, opened on June 23, 2019. After a remediation process to clean the site, Wynn Resorts constructed Encore Boston as an integrated resort with a hotel, a harborwalk, restaurants, a casino, spa, retail outlets, and meeting and convention space. Public amenities along the year-round harborwalk include a picnic park, paths for bikers and pedestrians, viewing decks, waterfront dining and retail, a performance lawn, floral displays, and boat docks. Wynn Resorts described the $2.6 billion development as "the largest private single-phase construction project in the history of the Commonwealth of Massachusetts." A bike and pedestrian bridge is being designed by MassDOT to connect the public boardwalk at the Encore Resort to Somerville's Draw Seven park.

Most of the remaining land south of the Newburyport/Rockport Line and Massachusetts Route 99 in Everett is taken up by a tank farm and oil terminal on the Mystic River. In December 2023, the Conservation Law Foundation announced it had settled a federal pollution lawsuit with Exxon. The company sold the site for cleanup and redevelopment starting with raising the land to avoid climate change-related flooding and adding apartment buildings near Route 16. Exxon also agreed to a deed restriction which prevents the land from ever being used for fossil fuel storage in the future. A 700 MW, 4-hour battery has received approval for construction by the Energy Facilities Siting Board.

Everett has an increasing population as people are seeking new households near downtown Boston while not wanting to pay the higher prices of living now associated with surrounding municipalities, such as those in neighborhoods of Boston, Cambridge, or Somerville.

== Geography ==
Everett is bordered by Malden on the north, Revere on the east, Chelsea on the southeast, the Malden River and Medford on the west, and the Mystic River on the south (Somerville and Boston are south of the Mystic River). Island End River flows through the city, though it was contained in a culvert and invisible to residents until being partly unearthed in 2021.

According to the United States Census Bureau, the city has a total area of 3.7 square miles (9.6 km^{2}), of which 3.4 square miles (8.8 km^{2}) is land and 0.3 square miles (0.78 km^{2}) (7.63%) is water.

== Demographics ==
Historical population
Year	Pop.	±%
1870	2,220	—
1880	4,159	+87.3%
1890	11,068	+166.1%
1900	24,336	+119.9%
1910	33,484	+37.6%
1920	40,120	+19.8%
1930	48,424	+20.7%
1940	46,784	−3.4%
1950	45,982	−1.7%
1960	43,544	−5.3%
1970	42,485	−2.4%
1980	37,195	−12.5%
1990	35,701	−4.0%
2000	38,037	+6.5%
2010	41,667	+9.5%
2020	49,075	+17.8%
2025*	53,572	+9.2%
* = population estimate. Source: United States census records and Population Estimates Program data. Source: U.S. Decennial Census

=== 2020 census ===
As of the 2020 census, Everett had a population of 49,075. The median age was 35.2 years. 22.0% of residents were under the age of 18 and 11.1% of residents were 65 years of age or older. For every 100 females there were 98.6 males, and for every 100 females age 18 and over there were 97.7 males age 18 and over.

100.0% of residents lived in urban areas, while 0.0% lived in rural areas.

There were 17,211 households in Everett, of which 35.4% had children under the age of 18 living in them. Of all households, 40.6% were married-couple households, 21.6% were households with a male householder and no spouse or partner present, and 30.8% were households with a female householder and no spouse or partner present. About 24.6% of all households were made up of individuals and 8.8% had someone living alone who was 65 years of age or older.

There were 18,208 housing units, of which 5.5% were vacant. The homeowner vacancy rate was 0.9% and the rental vacancy rate was 4.0%.

Racial composition as of the 2020 census
Race	Number	Percent
White	18,352	37.4%
Black or African American	7,189	14.6%
American Indian and Alaska Native	326	0.7%
Asian	3,712	7.6%
Native Hawaiian and Other Pacific Islander	15	0.0%
Some other race	11,047	22.5%
Two or more races	8,434	17.2%
Hispanic or Latino (of any race)	13,990	28.5%

=== 2010 census ===
At the 2010 census, the racial makeup of the city was 53.6% Non-Hispanic Whites, 14.3% African American, 4.8% Asian, 0.4% Pacific Islander, 2% from other races, and 3.8% were multiracial. Hispanic or Latino of any race were 21.1% of the population (9.3% Salvadoran, 3.0% Puerto Rican, 1.1% Colombian, 1.1% Dominican, 1.0% Guatemalan, 0.8% Mexican).

=== 2000 census ===
There were 15,435 households, out of which 27.6% had children under the age of 18 living with them, 41.8% were married couples living together, 15.2% had a female householder with no husband present, and 38.1% were non-families. 31.3% of all households were made up of individuals, and 11.8% had someone living alone who was 65 years of age or older. The average household size was 2.45 and the average family size was 3.11.

The population was spread out, with 21.6% under the age of 18, 8.9% from 18 to 24, 34.8% from 25 to 44, 19.9% from 45 to 64, and 14.7% who were 65 years of age or older. The median age was 36 years. For every 100 females, there were 91 males. For every 100 females age 18 and over, there were 87.4 males.

The median income for a household in the city was $49,737. The median income for a family is $49,876. Males had a median income of $36,047 versus $30,764 for females. The per capita income for the city was $23,876. About 9.2% of families and 11.9% of the population were below the poverty line, including 16.9% of those under age 18 and 10.0% of those age 65 or over.

=== Immigration and ancestry ===
The city also has a large number of people of Brazilian and Italian descent. In 2010, 33% of the residents of Everett were born outside the United States. This percentage was around 11% in 1990.

=== Safety ===
Everett’s overall crime rate has been reported as below the national average in multiple crime analyses. For example, one FBI-based summary estimated Everett’s total crime rate at approximately 1,662 incidents per 100,000 residents, about 22% lower than the U.S. average. The same summary reported a violent crime rate of roughly 348 incidents per 100,000 residents, which is substantially lower than that of neighboring Chelsea.

== Government ==
=== Local ===
Everett has a mayor-council form of government, where the mayor serves a four-year term. The Everett city council was the last existing bicameral legislature in any American city, consisting of a Board of Aldermen and a Common Council. As of November 8, 2011, it became a unicameral City Council.

Board of Aldermen

The Board of Aldermen consisted of seven members one from each of the city's six wards and one Alderman-at-Large. All Aldermen were elected citywide for a term of two years.

In addition to the duties they shared with the Common Council, the Board of Aldermen was the licensing authority in the city and approved licenses for motor dealers, second-hand dealers, awnings, lodging houses, junk dealers, pool tables, open-air parking lots, coin-operated devices, Lord's Day licenses, antique and precious metal dealers.

Common Council

The Common Council consisted of three members elected per ward for a total of eighteen members. The Common Council shared equal responsibility for most legislative actions with the exception of licensing and confirmation of most Mayoral appointees.

=== State ===
Everett is represented in the state legislature by officials elected from the following districts:

- Massachusetts Senate's Middlesex and Suffolk district
- Massachusetts House of Representatives' 28th Middlesex district

=== Voter party enrollment ===
Voter registration and party enrollment as of February 1, 2025
Party	Number of Voters	Percentage
Democratic	7,907	32.94%
Republican	1,158	4.82%
Unaffiliated	14,715	61.31%
Other parties	222	0.09%
Total	24,002	100%

== Education ==
Everett has ten public schools, which include elementary schools, K–8 schools, and Everett High School. The city also has one Private K–8 school and had a private Catholic high school, Pope John XXIII High School, which was forced, due to financial difficulties, to close on May 31, 2019. Everett High School moved to its new location at 100 Elm Street beginning in the 2007–2008 school year.

== Landmarks ==
Part of the historic Revere Beach Parkway, listed on the National Register of Historic Places, lies in Everett.

The New England Revolution of Major League Soccer plan to build a soccer specific stadium in Everett.

== Economy ==
The Mystic Generating Station has been producing electricity since the early twentieth century. It was built by Boston Edison and is now operated by Exelon. It has the largest capacity of any electrical plant in the state.

The Leavitt Corporation has been manufacturing its trademark Teddie Peanut Butter in the city since 1924.

Besides Everett Square, Gateway Center just off Route 16 in Everett is a major retail shopping district with big box stores.

== Transportation ==
Everett's business district is focused on Broadway (part of Route 99), with many businesses and restaurants along the route. The Massachusetts Bay Transportation Authority (MBTA) operates public buses through the city, which includes several routes that converge at a hub at Everett Square. A bus lane exists on Broadway, from Glendale Square (Ferry Street), to Sweetser Circle. MBTA also operates a subway system that includes Wellington (on the Orange Line), which lies just west of the Everett city limits in nearby Medford, and a commuter rail system with a stop in Chelsea to the southeast. Route 16 traverses the southern area of the city, providing access to U.S. Route 1 and Interstate 93. Both highways run just outside of the city limits and provide connections to Boston.

== Notable people ==
See also Category:People from Everett, Massachusetts

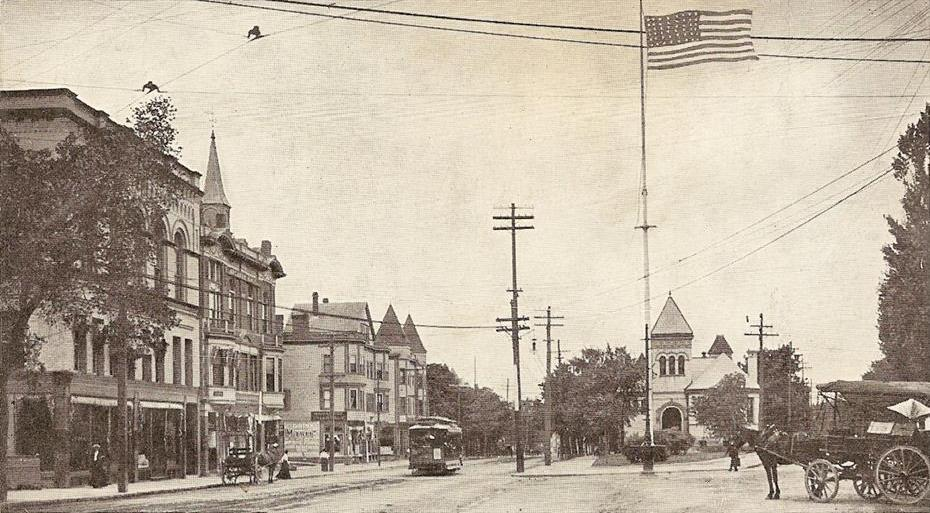
View of Everett Square in 1902

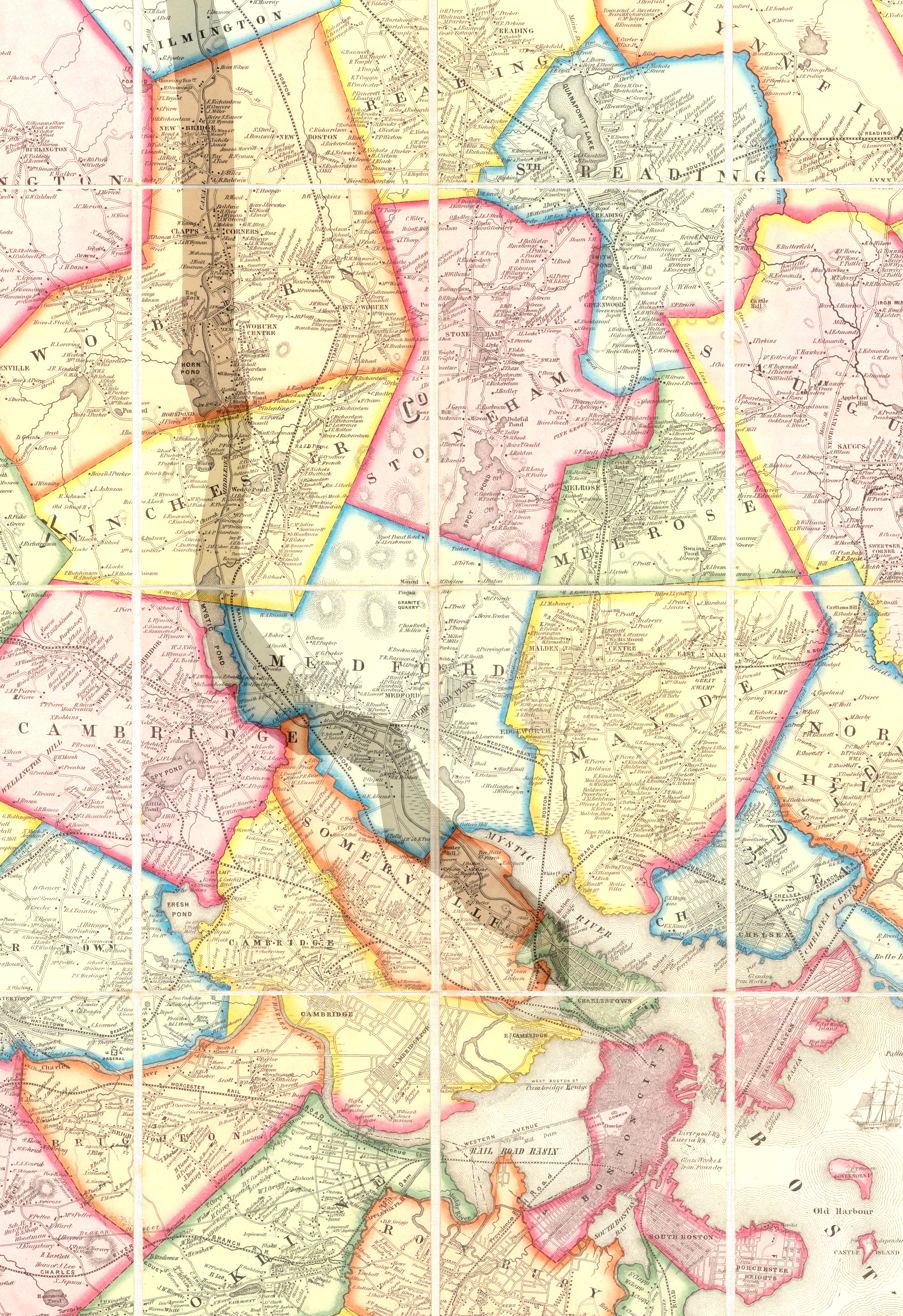
1852 Map of the Boston area showing South Malden, which later became Everett

Everett has contributed a significant amount of football players to both the college football circuit and the National Football League (NFL).

- Bryan Arenales, winner of Love Island USA in 2025 alongside Amaya Espinal
- Belden Bly, member of the Massachusetts House of Representatives
- Mike Borgonzi former Kansas City Chiefs assistant general manager and current general manager of the Tennessee Titans
- Pat Bradley, Arkansas basketball player and sports commentator
- Matthew W. Bullock, Everett High School sports star, Dartmouth and Harvard Law School graduate, pioneering football coach, state government appointed service and national leader in the Urban League and the Bahá'í Faith
- Vannevar Bush, engineer and head of the United States Office of Scientific Research and Development
- George Russell Callender, military official and author
- Walter Tenney Carleton, founding director of the NEC Corporation
- Walter Carrington, US Ambassador to Nigeria & Senegal
- Benjamin Castleman, pathologist and namesake of Castleman's disease
- Lewis Cine, football player for the Minnesota Vikings
- Patricia Courtney, All-American Girls Professional Baseball League player
- Arthur Dearborn, Olympic track and field athlete
- Johnny Dell Isola, former National Football League player
- Louis DeLuca, member of the Connecticut Senate
- Omar Easy, NFL football player
- Maddy English, All-American Girls Professional Baseball League player
- Diamond Ferri, CFL & NFL player
- Rachel Morton Harris, soprano
- Hub Hart, MLB catcher
- Pat Hughes, NFL player
- Brian Kelly, LSU head football coach
- John P. Kennedy, Member of the Massachusetts House of Representatives
- George Keverian, Speaker of the Massachusetts House of Representatives
- Torbert Macdonald, member of the United States House of Representatives
- Hermon Atkins MacNeil, sculptor
- Mary Eliza Mahoney, first African American to study and work as a professionally trained nurse in the United States (not from Everett but is buried there)
- A. David Mazzone, judge and attorney
- George J. Mead, aircraft engineer
- Gertrude Nason, artist
- Nerlens Noel, Oklahoma City Thunder center
- Andrew "Swede" Oberlander, College Football Hall of Famer
- Al Pierotti, football, baseball, pro wrestling
- Ellen Pompeo, actress
- Dan Ross, NFL player
- Danny Silva, MLB player, Boston Celtics assistant coach, WWI and WWII veteran, longtime Everett teacher and coach
- Paul L. Smith, actor
- E. Leroy Sweetser, U.S. Army brigadier general, resided in Everett
- Jim Tozzi, member of the PFFR art collective responsible for Adult Swim shows like Wonder Showzen, Xavier: Renegade Angel, and The Shivering Truth
- Joseph Frank Wehner, fighter pilot during World War I
- Mike Sainristil, NFL football player

== In popular culture ==
- Everett was home to the set of the 2012 ABC series Boston's Finest.
- The 2007 Ben Affleck film Gone Baby Gone was partially filmed and set in Everett.
- The old Everett High School was used for the filming of scenes for the Adam Sandler movie That's My Boy, the Kevin James movie Here Comes the Boom, and most recently, the 2016 film Ghostbusters starring Melissa McCarthy, Kristen Wiig, Kate McKinnon, and Leslie Jones.
