= Over the River...Life of Lydia Maria Child, Abolitionist for Freedom =

Over the River…Life of Lydia Maria Child, Abolitionist for Freedom
- Directed by: Constance L. Jackson
- Starring: James M. Black; Michele Patterson; Greta Muxworthy; Beth Lockhart; Jacob Conrad
- Edited by: Christopher L. Rowland
- Release date: November 17, 2007
- Running time: 140 minutes
- Country: United States
- Language: English

Over the River...Life of Lydia Maria Child, Abolitionist for Freedom is a 2007 documentary film and book about the life of Lydia Maria Child. The film was produced by Permanent Productions, Inc., written and directed by Constance L. Jackson, narrated by Diahann Carroll and features James Moses Black, Michele S. Patterson, Greta Muxworthy, Beth Lockhart and Jacob Conrad.

== Overview ==
Before the Civil Rights Movement of the 1950s and 1960s and before the names of Rev. Martin Luther King Jr. and Rosa Parks were uttered as harbingers of social justice, came the first Civil Rights Movement in America—the abolitionists of the 19th century. Abolitionists used literature, petitions, and public speaking to forge change, but there was one who stood out in her time that was central to altering America's course: the author and editor, Lydia Maria (pronounced Mariah) Child. Many would argue that Lydia Maria Child and the abolitionist cause were one of the key reasons the Civil War happened. Coined by William Lloyd Garrison as the "First Woman in the Republic," Child was an unwavering advocate for change. Child's influence extended to legislators and to President Abraham Lincoln. A friend and loyalist to African Americans, Native Americans, and immigrant causes, Child's literature, that span 50 years, made her a household name in thousands of homes during those tumultuous times in America. She is known today as the author of the Thanksgiving Day song Over the River and Through the Wood to Grandmother's House We Go.

Her many books were the first written on the subjects of religious ideas, aging, interracial love, domestic advice, Indian rights, women's rights, prison and social reform, and abolishing slavery. The bombshell book written in 1833 An Appeal in Favor of that Class of Americans Called Africans transcended time and was used by leaders during the 1960s Civil Rights Movement. Many of her books are housed in museums or used as reference material in libraries, while some of her works are still published today for lay readers, scholars, and researchers studying the impact she made on Americans.

Lydia Maria Child was an influential figure among her abolitionist and literary peers. Over the River highlights the relationship Child had with notable figures such as William Lloyd Garrison, Theodore Parker, Thomas Wentworth Higginson, Abby Kelley, Frederick Douglass, Lucretia Mott, Maria Weston Chapman, Harriet Jacobs, Senator Charles Sumner, John Brown, Angelina Grimke, Robert Gould Shaw, Edgar Allan Poe, Margaret Fuller, violinist Ole Bull, John Greenleaf Whittier, James Russell Lowell, and Isaac T. Hopper, just to name a few.

The epic three-part documentary DVD and book Over the River...Life of Lydia Maria Child, Abolitionist for Freedom explores the life of Lydia Maria Child and the abolitionist soldiers, illustrating how young and old rallied for social change for all Americans.

Jackson presented Over The River at Colgate University on October 22, 2009 and led a workshop discussion titled "Becoming an Agent of Change, Then and Now" the following day.

== Cast ==
- Diahann Carroll, narrator
- James Moses Black, David Walker
- Michele S. Patterson, Adult Lydia Maria Child
- Greta Muxworthy, Young Lydia Maria Child
- Beth Lockhart, Young Adult Lydia Maria Child
- Jacob Conrad, Religious Critic
- Darnell R. Ford, Slave and Preacher
