= Hobomok =

1824 novel by Lydia Maria Child

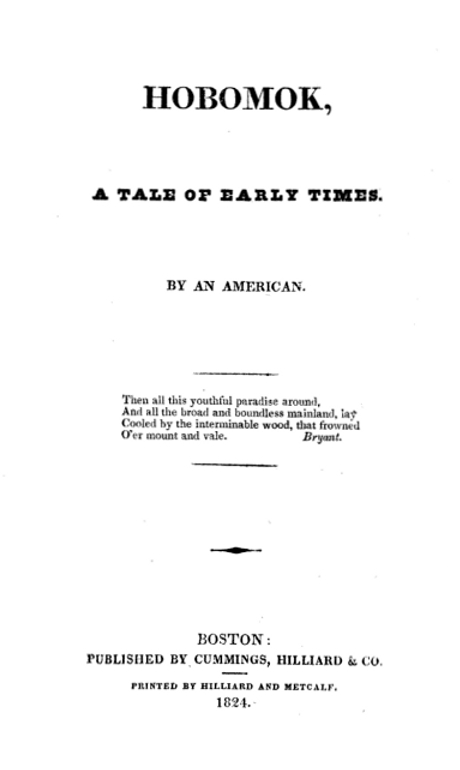
Title page.

Hobomok, A Tale of Early Times. is a novel by the nineteenth-century American author and human rights campaigner Lydia Maria Child. Her first novel, published in 1824 under the pseudonym "An American", was inspired by John G. Palfrey's article in the North American Review. The novel is set during the late 1620s and 1630s. Among other themes, it relates the marriage of a recently immigrated white American woman, Mary Conant, to the eponymous Native American and her attempt to raise their son in white society.

The subject of miscegenation being taboo, the book initially fared poorly. An early review in the North American Review called the story "unnatural" and "revolting to every feeling of delicacy". However, before too long (and partly due to Child's intervention in Boston literary circles), many prominent Bostonians celebrated the novel. Child was later active as an abolitionist, feminist and supporter of Native Americans.

== Plot ==
Hobomok is a work of historical fiction set in colonial New England. The events of the novel take place between 1629 and 1632 and concern the settlement of Plymouth and Salem, Massachusetts, by British-born Puritans, who are seeking religious freedom in the New World. The novel's protagonist is a teenage girl named Mary Conant, who, forbidden by her father to marry a non-Puritan white man, leaves white society for Native American society. She marries Hobomok, an indigenous man who has been an ally to her family. The novel ends when Mary's white lover, believed to be dead, returns to the colony. Hobomok dissolves his marriage to Mary, enabling her to marry Charles and to be reintegrated into white colonial society.

== Major characters ==
Mary Conant is the daughter of Mr. and Mrs. Conant and the novel's protagonist. At the beginning of the novel, she appears obedient and angelic, the ideal daughter. As time moves on, Mary develops her sense of self and breaks from the mold of her Puritan community. Even though Mr. Conant forbids her relationship with Charles Brown, Mary ignores him and pursues Brown. Mary's strong-willed character and rebellious attitude manifest themselves in all aspects of her life. Towards the end of the novel, she marries Hobomok and has a child.

Mr. Conant is Mary's father and an authority in the Puritan Church. Mr. Conant is a traditionalist and doesn't allow Mary to marry Charles Brown because of their religious differences. Mr. Conant is the quintessential Puritan man: strict, stoic and repressive.

Mrs. Conant is married to Mr. Conant and is the mother of Mary. She is religious like her husband and frequently described as gentle and weak. She is obedient to her husband but wants the best for her daughter Mary. After she gets sick, on her deathbed, she tells her husband to let Mary marry Charles.

Charles Hobomok Conant (child) is the child of Hobomok and Mary Conant. After Hobomok's departure, he is raised by Mary and Charles in white society.

Sally Oldham Collier is the daughter of Mr. Oldham and best friend of Mary Conant. Sally is a flirty and mischievous personality who attracts many suitors. She works on her father's farm and acts as a nurse to the Salem colony. She is described as an upbeat personality with rosy skin, blue eyes and a plump figure. She ultimately marries John Collier, despite a marriage proposal from a different man named James Hopkins. Sally is known for presenting controversial opinions and for being assertive, as well as for being a free spirit who is apprehensive of the structure that living amongst a colony may bring to her life. Sally is against the marriage of Mary and Hobomok, but eventually comes to accept it, stating that he is “the best Indian I ever knew”, and that he now “seems almost like an Englishman” (172). Sally does not support Native Americans, rather she supports the idea of the “noble savage” and the westernization of native people.

Mr. Oldham is the father of Sally Oldham and family friend of Mr. Conant. He retains quite an outgoing nature, frequently questioning the current religious practices. This nature is also reflected through his daughter, Sally, who lives freely and speaks openly without the fear of consequences. Mr. Oldham is first introduced when he offers Mr. Conant some tobacco from his farm. He serves the purpose of progressing the debates with many of the main characters about the growing religious restrictions placed by the church.

Hobomok is referenced throughout the story as the "savage" who helps the Puritans travel from Salem to Plymouth, acting as a literal and figurative connection between civilization and the natural world. He is part of a Massachusetts tribe, and acts as a loyal friend to the Salem settlers. He is described as "poetic" and "figurative" with his language, and "unwarped by the artifices of civilized life", which paints him as pure and untouched (151). He is mainly featured in the story as pursuing Mary Conant, eventually marrying her and having a child who is named Charles Hobomok Conant.

Charles Brown is an Episcopalian and wishes to marry Mary. He is cast out of the colonies for his outspoken religious beliefs. Once back in England, he decides to go on a mission trip to the East Indies. On the way, he is shipwrecked and held prisoner for three years before making his way back to New England to marry Mary.

John Collier delivers a proposal message to Sally from James Hopkins. However, Sally rejects Hopkins and tells Collier that she would have said yes if it was Collier doing the asking. He marries Sally and they move to Plymouth together.

James Hopkins is Sally's potential suiter from Plymouth and sends a proposal letter to Sally, which she rejects.

The Widow Willet, also referred to as Dame Willet, helps Mary and Brown meet before he leaves for England. She tries to comfort Mary when she receives word of Brown's death and moves in with Mr. Conant when Mary leaves for Plymouth with Hobomok.

Lady Arabella Johnson arrives in Salem with her husband, Isaac Johnson. She knew Mary in England and is a great comfort to her up until her death. On her deathbed, she asks Mr. Johnson to give her wedding ring to Mary.

== Chapter summaries ==
Chapter 1. The narrator describes his relationship to the land of New England and tells the story of one of his ancestors who lived 200 years ago. The ancestor arrives at Naumkeak (present day Salem, Massachusetts) and converses with Mr. Conant and Mr. Oldham about the colony. After dark, Mary makes her way into the woods and performs a ceremonial love ritual to reveal her true love. Hobomok, a Native American, jumps into the ritual circle before Charles Brown comes and escorts her away.

Chapter 2. The people of the colony—which is now named Salem—gather to fulfill an order from the London Company and see the ships off. Afterwards, Thomas Graves tries to flirt with Sally Oldham, who wittily shoots him down. Mary and Sally walk together and Mary tells of the ritual she performed. She thinks that Hobomok played a trick on her and explains that Charles found her after he'd had a dream that she was in danger.

Chapter 3. Mary goes out to milk the cows when Mr. Graves comes to flirt with her once again and she shoots him down once again. John Collier comes to call on the Oldham family and discusses religion, England, and the influence of the Catholic Church with them. Mr. Collier brings a marriage proposal from James Hopkins to Sally, but she tells him she prefers to be with Collier instead. Collier shares Sally's sentiment and her parents approve the match.

Chapter 4. Hobomok goes to deliver a message from Massasoit to Sagamore John. There, he gets into an altercation when Corbitant accuses him of having feelings for Mary. Hobomok nearly kills him, but Sagamore John steps in and they settle down for a meal. As Hobomok leaves, he contemplates the idea that he might have feelings for Mary, but rejects them. Corbitant follows Hobomok and the two fight. Hobomok knocks Corbitant unconscious.

Chapter 5. Mary is saddened by her mother's drastically decaying health it is said she finds comfort in her friend Hobomok. Hobomok returns to Salem and reports to the townspeople that alliances have been formed against them and warn them of an attack from Corbitant and the others, then leaves. The men discuss religion until Hobomok returns and an attack is mounted on the people of Salem, specifically with the intent of burning down the Conant's house. Hobomok stands guard outside of the Conant's house while it is happening.

Chapter 6. The morning after the attack, the townspeople decide to deliver the Indigenous people they have held prisoner to Massasoit in Plymouth. The women of the town gather at Mrs. Conant's to gossip about the attacks. Mrs. Conant and Mr. Oldham correct their assumptions. It is revealed that Mary has invited Brown over, as her father has gone with the men to Plymouth. Brown and Mary discuss leaving the New World behind, but refuses to leave her dying mother.

Chapter 7. Collier travels back to Plymouth to deliver the unfortunate news of Sally declining James Hopkins's marriage proposal. Adding insult to injury, Collier unwillingly admits to Hopkins that Sally had in fact chosen him instead. This infuriates Hopkins, so he brings Collier to trial in front of the church. The church deems that Hopkins is not guilty, yet they still request a written statement of the account from Sally. Sally is illiterate, so Mary writes the formal statement for her. Sally claims full responsibility for her actions. Mr. Oldham, Sally's father, attaches an additional note speaking to his discomfort with the growing restrictions placed by the church. Collier is cleared, and Sally is reprimanded for being ‘unladylike.’

Chapter 8. Many weeks have passed, during which Mr. Collier has visited Sally as often as possible and Hobomok has divided his time equally between his home near Plymouth and the Conant's house. The narrator explains that the many religious discussions that have happened in these weeks have been omitted as they follow the same pattern as the previous discussions in the book. Sally and Mr. Collier's wedding day is described in detail and the couple is happy.

Chapter 9. Higginson is chosen to be the church preacher and Governor Bradford and the elders of Plymouth are invited to attend the first sermon, in which Higginson expresses his concerns that sin is seeping into the Puritan community, all while gesturing to Brown and his fellow non-conformists. After the church service, Mr. Conant, Mr. Oldham, and Mr. Graves discuss the sermon and Brown's influence. Tents are put up for the visitors from Plymouth and many conversations about current events are had.

Chapter 10. A trial is held by Governor Endicott and the church elders to try and prove that Brown's Episcopalian religion is disrupting the community. He and his brother, Samuel, are sentenced to leave for England on the next ship. Brown asks Mary to join him, who refuses on account of her dying mother. Mary and Mrs. Conant decide that shall write a letter for Brown to deliver to Mary's grandfather in England. Mr. Conant is furious when he finds Brown in his house, so Brown says his goodbyes to Mary and she cries herself to sleep.

Chapter 11. The day before Brown is set to leave, the Conant women write their letters. Mary goes to ask Sally to deliver them to Brown, but finds that Mary is leaving for Plymouth that afternoon. They share tearful and heartfelt goodbyes. With the help of the widow Willet, Mary and Brown are able to meet in secret at her house that night. The spend the night talking of the future before Brown leaves for the ship at sunrise. Mary watches the ship depart from woody hill.

Chapter 12. In the monotonous winter following Brown's departure, Hobomok pays frequent visits to Mary and his love for Mary—"the child of good spirit"—intensifies. He trades the hide of a beaver for fox fur to give to her. After Mr. Conant makes a comment about Hobomok hunting, Hobomok tells him that he, Sagamore John, and a few others are going on a midnight hunt. Mary wishes to see it and Mr. Conant escorts her and other girls from Salem to watch it. Hobomok kills a deer and Mary cannot look at its corpse.

Chapter 13. Mary passes the spring with much weariness of her lonely state; luckily, in June, she is joined by Mr. Isaac Johnson and his wife Lady Arabella, another prominent English family who comes to build the New World. Mary and Lady Arabella knew each other in England and the Lady stays with the Conants. The Conants warmly welcome the Johnsons to a dinner, at which they discuss the current affairs of the monarchy and the church, including Brown, who has found good favor in England. The Conants apologize for their small dwelling and food, but speak highly of Hobomok for bringing veal and stories.

Chapter 14. Mrs. Conant and Mary receive letters from Mary's grandfather. Mary receives a package from her friend George, the Earl of Lincoln, and from Brown. Brown's package contains a prayer book and a miniature portrait for her, a pipe, a bible for the widow Willet, and a gown for Sally. In his letter, Brown explains that he is going to the East Indies but he will return to New England the following year, when he hopes to be reunited with Mary.

Chapter 15. Lady Arabella supports her husband's work on building churches in the colonies, but her health declines. She and Mrs. Conant, whose condition has worsened, are bedridden for days. On her deathbed, Mrs. Conant asks her husband to allow the marriage between Mary and Charles. He agrees; she dies with both her husband and Mary at her side. The next morning, Lady Arabella awakes to say goodbye to her husband and asks him to give Mary her wedding ring; she dies thereafter. Days after the joint funeral, Mr. Johnson dies of a broken heart and asks to be buried at Tri-Mountain (Boston) to look over the work he's done. Mr. Higginson dies as well, and the people of the colonies believe they've been smitten by God.

Chapter 16. Mr. Conant becomes more gentle after his wife's passing and Hobomok tries to comfort Mary; she does not acknowledge him. While sitting at her mother's grave, Mary witnesses an apparition of “a vessel” in the clouds and interprets it as a bad omen toward Brown's return. Soon thereafter, Hobomok comes to Salem with letters for Mr. Conant and Governor Endicott. The letters contain information that both Mary's grandfather and Brown are dead. Mary, who heard the news in passing, seeks confirmation from Endicott, who tells her that it is true. She cannot bring herself to cry. Mr. Conant, quilt ridden from the way he treated Brown, attempts to console Mary but is unsuccessful. She leaves him to go to the widow Willet's house.

Chapter 17. Mary leaves the widow Willet's house soon after she arrives, as it reminds her of the night before Brown left New England. She travels to her mother's grave and Hobomok arrives to comfort her. In the heat of the moment, she reasons that there is no one left for her to love and asks if Hobomok will marry her. He says yes. Mary goes home to pack and her resolve wavers when she realizes her father will be left alone. However, Mr. Conant tries to throw the prayer book given to her by Brown into the fire and this fixes her decision. Mary travels with Hobomok to his Plymouth home and they get married in the presence of his mother and relations.

Chapter 18. Mr. Conant awakes to find nor trace of Mary. He looks for her at the Oldham's and the widow Willet's, but finds no trace of her. He and the colonists believe she has drowned herself out of grief at Brown's death and the ring given to Mary by Lady Arabella is found on the shore. Mr. Conant invites the widow and her son to move in with him. Says later, Mr. Oldham receives word from Sally that Mary had married Hobomok and resided with him and his mother. Mr. Skelton is tasked with telling Mr. Conant, who is relieved that she is alive but finds it more torturous to know that she is married to a non-white, non-Puritan man.

Chapter 19. Mary is bedridden for many weeks following her impromptu wedding. Although she misses Brown, Mary slowly comes to love Hobomok more everyday over the next three years and they have a son, Charles Hobomok Conant, whom they call Little Hobomok. She is abandoned by all except Sally, who has a daughter and makes regular visits to see Mary. One night, Hobomok goes out to hunt and is greeted by Charles Brown, who was not killed but captured during his sea voyage. Hobomok briefly debates whether to kill him and decides not to. Hobomok states that Mary loved Brown first and that he will leave her so the two can be together. He leaves a deer and a note by the Colliers' house and leaves Plymouth.

Chapter 20. Brown makes his way to the Collier household after Hobomok leaves him and takes care to not spook Mr. Collier and Sally. He tells the Colliers that he was in a shipwreck and taken prisoner for three years. Mr. Collier discovers the deer and the note from Hobomok outside. The note details that Hobomok has divorced Mary so that she may be happy. Sally goes to Mary to explain all that has happened to her. Brown and Mary reunite and Brown meets Little Hobomok. They decide to get married and have a small ceremony move into a house next to Mr. Conant. Little Hobomok is sent to Cambridge, years later, with money set aside by Mary's grandfather. Hobomok is never forgotten.

== Background and influences ==
“What dictates the plot of Hobomok is not its author's awareness of racial issues, but her rebellion against patriarchy. The result is a revolutionary insight into the connection between male dominance and white supremacy."

Child was an avid reader of classical and contemporary works during her adolescence: Homer, Johnson, Milton, and Scott.

In her early twenties, she was inspired by essays written by literary critics in the North American Review, exhorting American writers to develop a genuinely American literature, free of European influence. American geography and social history was said to offer “panoramic landscapes, heroic Puritan settlers, and exotic Indian folklore” with which to forge compelling romance novels. Child was familiar with the time-line of Puritan history and had lived in Maine (then a portion of Massachusetts) for eight years, where she had numerous encounters with the indigenous people.

=== The epic poem Yamowyden (1820) and Hobomok ===
The 23-year-old Child discovered the narrative poem Yamowyden, a Tale of the Wars of King Philip: in Six Cantos (1820) when examining an old edition of the North American Review. Written by James Wallace Eastburn and Robert Charles Sands, the work had been provided an enthusiastic review by critic John G. Palfrey, declaring it a milestone in American literature. The poem, according to Palfrey, was a vigorous and striking dramatization of the King Philip’s War (1675–1676), demanding emulation from American writers. Lydia Maria Child recalled:

I had never dreamed of such a thing as turning writer; but I siezed [sic] a pen, and before the bell rang for afternoon meeting I had written the first chapter, exactly as it now stands…

The degree to which Child’s Hobomok was influenced by the earlier narrative poem is disputed. Biographer Carolyn L. Karcher notes that the similarities between are not superficial:

Both describe their Indian title characters as “cast in nature’s noblest mould [sic]”; both feature Anglo-American heroines who elope with Indian lovers in defiance of paternal wishes. And both model themselves on William Shakespeare’s Othello having their dark-skinned heroes win the love of a white woman through eloquent recitals of their exploits and adventures.

Karchner reports that Child’s “political consciousness” on the historical facts relating to the systematic expiration of native populations beginning in the American colonial period was fundamentally flawed at the time she penned Hobomok. As such, the central theme that emerges in Hobomok is more a resistance to male patriarchy than opposition to white supremacy, the latter which Child would soon embrace and becoming a highly influential abolitionist in the 1830s and 1840s.

Four years after writing Hobomok, in 1828, Child would join her spouse, David Lee Child, in crusades against the dispossession and expulsion of Cherokee Indians from ancestral lands in the Gulf Coast interior of the United States. The Indian Removal Act of 1830 ordered these largely agrarian people to occupy lands west of the Mississippi in what is now the state of Oklahoma. The removal was ultimately effected in The Trail of Tears of 1838.

== Key themes ==
Gender expectations: Key to the central conflict of Hobomok is the idea of Mary's identity as a woman. In the colony, she is expected to play the role of a secondary subject to the men in her life. Yet, she disrupts this expectation by taking an active part in her destiny. She pursues Hobomok, a native, and pays no mind to the roles that her family and Church expect her to fulfill. She becomes wild and powerful, like the untamed North American land, validating the fear held by male authority figures that women would be uncontrollable in the New World.

Puritan repression: A key theme throughout Hobomok is the effect of Puritanism in Salem. The novel suggests that the unstable nature of early American colonies was due, in part, to social repression and disparate distribution of power. This idea is voiced by Mr. Oldham in a letter to Church elders. The letter serves as a warning toward the church that too much repression will result in rebellion. Oldham uses the metaphor that the church is “running its horses so hard, and drawing the reins so tight, that they might raise up and caste their riders into the mud.” The novel suggests that Mary's relationship with Hobomok constitutes one such rebellion.

Race relations: The character Homobok reflects Child's understanding of white-Native American relationship. Child's depiction of Hobomok, and Native Americans in general, is progressive only to the extent of the early 19th century context. The story of an interracial marriage between a supposedly devoted Puritan and a Native American was truly novel at the time, even to a degree that Child felt the need to publish it anonymously under a pretense that the novel was authored by a man. However, the character Hobomok remains in the category of the "noble savage": a loyal ally to the white settlers who is considerably westernized and, in the 19th century context, civilized. Readers are constantly reminded of the racial status of Native Americans by the consistent use of word "savage" as Child refers to Hobomok and as Homobok refers to himself by third-person pronouns in conversations. However, Child does not indulge the U.S. policies toward Native Americans at the time. In fact, Child imagines a collaborative and inter-cultural relationship between the white settlers and Native Americans through the problematic but also harmonious marriage of Hobomok and Mary.

== Sources ==
- Child, Lydia Maria. 1988. Hobomok and Other Writings on Indians. American Women's Writers Series. Edited by Carolyn L. Karcher. Rutgers University Press, New Brunswick, New Jersey. ISBN 0-8135-1164-X
- Karcher, Carolyn L. 1988. Introduction to Hobomok and Other Writings on Indians, pp. ix–xxxxviii. Rutgers University Press, New Brunswick, New Jersey. ISBN 0-8135-1164-X
