= The Frugal Housewife =

The Frugal Housewife may refer to:

- The Frugal Housewife, or, Complete woman cook; a household management and cookery book published by Susannah Carter circa 1765
- The American Frugal Housewife, originally published by Lydia Maria Child in 1829 as The Frugal Housewife before it was renamed to avoid confusion with Carter's text.
