= Lydia Maria Child =

American abolitionist, author, and activist (1802–1880)

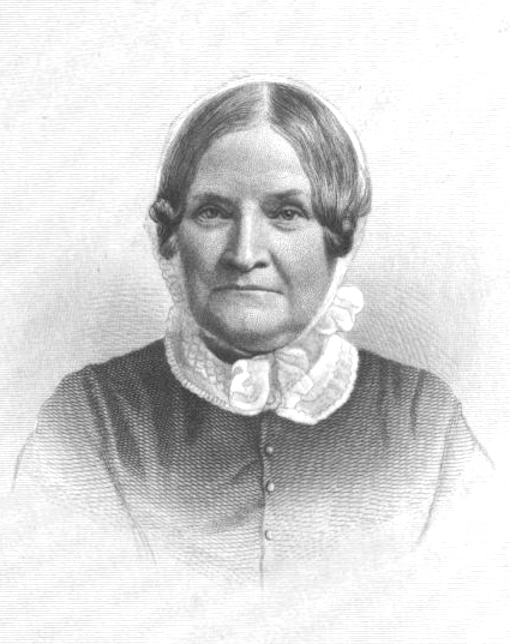
- An 1882 engraving of Child
- Born: Lydia Maria Francis; February 11, 1802; Medford, Massachusetts, U.S.
- Died: October 20, 1880 (aged 78); Wayland, Massachusetts, U.S.
- Resting place: North Cemetery; Wayland, Massachusetts, U.S.
- Occupations: Abolitionist; activist; novelist; journalist
- Spouse: David Lee Child (m. 1828; died 1874)
- Relatives: Convers Francis (brother)
- Writing career
- Notable works: An Appeal in Favor of that Class of Americans Called Africans; "Over the River and Through the Wood"; Hobomok, a Tale of Early Times.
- Movements: Abolitionist, feminism

Lydia Maria Child (née Francis; February 11, 1802 – October 20, 1880) was an American abolitionist, feminist, Native American rights activist, novelist, journalist, and opponent of American expansionism. Her journals, both fiction and domestic manuals, reached wide audiences from the 1820s through the 1850s. At times she shocked her audience as she tried to take on issues of both male dominance and white supremacy in some of her stories.

Despite these challenges, Child may be most remembered for her poem "Over the River and Through the Wood". Her grandparents' house, which she wrote about visiting, was restored by Tufts University in 1976 and stands near the Mystic River on South Street, in Medford, Massachusetts.

== Early life and education ==
Lydia Maria Francis was born in Medford, Massachusetts, on February 11, 1802, to Susannah (née Rand) and Convers Francis. Her older brother, Convers Francis, was educated at Harvard College and Seminary, and became a Unitarian minister. Francis received her education at a local dame school and later at a women's seminary. Upon the death of her mother, she went to live with her older sister in Maine, where she studied to be a teacher. During this time, her brother Convers, by then a Unitarian minister, saw to his younger sister's education in literary masters such as Homer and Milton. In her early 20s, Francis lived with her brother and met many of the top writers and thinkers of the day through him. She also converted to Unitarianism.

Francis chanced to read an article in the North American Review discussing the field offered to the novelist by early New England history. Although she had never thought of becoming an author, she immediately wrote the first chapter of her novel Hobomok. Encouraged by her brother's commendation, she finished it in six weeks and had it published. From this time until her death, she wrote continually.

Francis taught for one year in a seminary in Medford, and in 1824 started a private school in Watertown, Massachusetts. In 1826, she founded the Juvenile Miscellany, the first monthly periodical for children published in the United States, and supervised its publication for eight years. After publishing other works voicing her opposition to slavery, much of her audience turned against her, especially in the South. The Juvenile Miscellany closed down after book sales and subscriptions dropped.

In 1828, she married David Lee Child and moved to Boston.

== Career ==
=== Early writings ===
Following the success of Hobomok, Child wrote several novels, poetry, and an instruction manual for mothers, The Mothers Book; but her most successful work was The Frugal Housewife. Dedicated to those who are not ashamed of Economy. This book contained mostly recipes, but also contained this advice for young housewives, "If you are about to furnish a house, do not spend all your money.... Begin humbly." First published in 1829, the book was expanded and went through 33 printings in 25 years. Child wrote that her book had been "written for the poor ... those who can afford to be epicures will find the best of information in the Seventy-five Receipts" by Eliza Leslie.

Child changed the title to The American Frugal Housewife in 1832 to end the confusion with the British author Susannah Carter's The Frugal Housewife first published in 1765, and then printed in America from 1772. Child wrote that Carter's book was not suited "to the wants of this country". To add further confusion, from 1832 to 1834 Child's version was printed in London and Glasgow. Around this time she also published in The Token annual gift book.

=== Abolitionism and women's rights movements ===
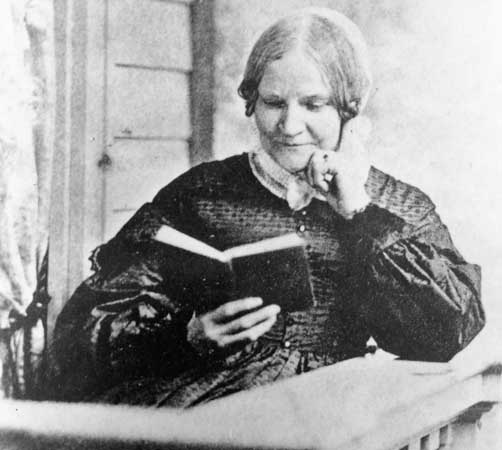
Child c. 1865, reading a book

In 1831, William Lloyd Garrison began publication of his influential abolitionist newspaper, The Liberator. Lydia Child and her husband read it from the beginning and began to identify themselves with the anti-slavery cause. Personal contact with Garrison was another factor. Child was a women's rights activist, but did not believe significant progress for women could be made until after the abolition of slavery. She believed that white women and enslaved people were similar in that white men held both groups in subjugation and treated them as property, instead of individual human beings. As she worked towards equality for women, Child publicly said that she did not care for all-female communities. She believed that women would be able to achieve more by working alongside men. Child, along with many other female abolitionists, began campaigning for equal female membership and participation in the American Anti-Slavery Society, provoking a controversy that later split the movement.

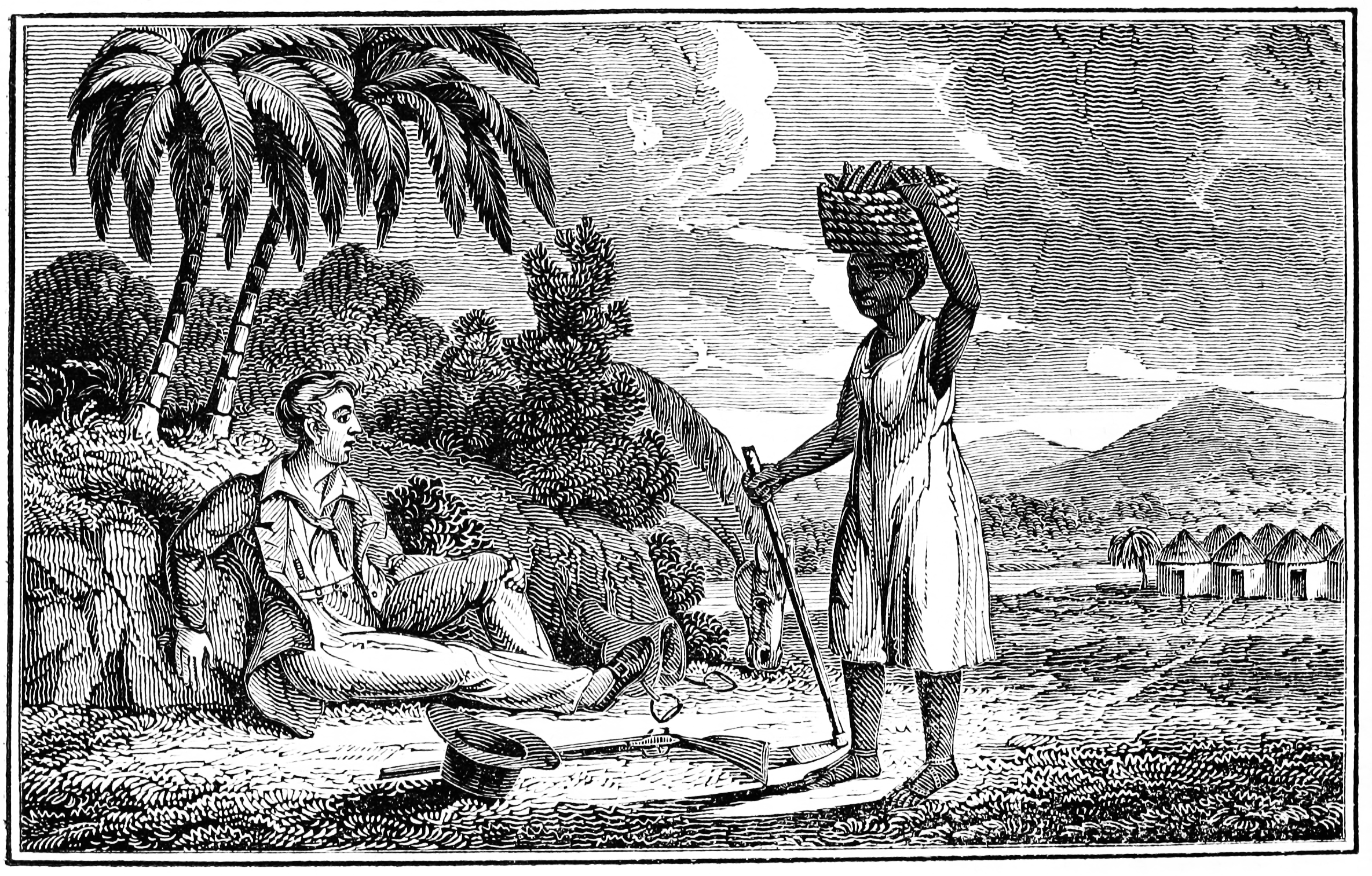
Illustration from An Appeal in Favor of that Class of Americans Called Africans

In 1833, she published her book An Appeal in Favor of that Class of Americans Called Africans. It argued, as did Garrison, in favor of the immediate emancipation of the enslaved people without compensation to their legal owners. She is sometimes said to have been the first white woman to have written a book in support of this policy. She "surveyed slavery from a variety of angles—historical, political, economic, legal, and moral" to show that "emancipation was practicable and that Africans were intellectually equal to Europeans." In this book, she wrote that "the intellectual inferiority of the negroes is a common, though most absurd apology, for personal prejudice." The book was the first anti-slavery work printed in America in book form. She followed it with several smaller works on the same subject. Her Appeal attracted much attention, and William Ellery Channing, who attributed to it part of his interest in the slavery question, walked from Boston to Roxbury to thank Child for the book. She had to endure social ostracism, but from this time was considered a conspicuous champion of anti-slavery.

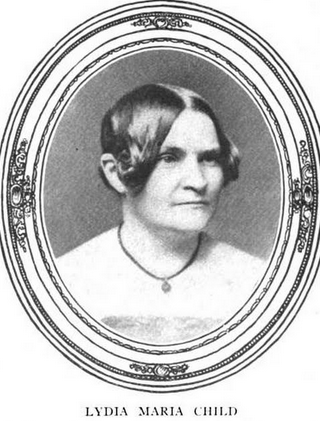
Lydia Maria Child, from a 1910 publication

Child, a strong supporter and organizer in anti-slavery societies, helped with fundraising efforts to finance the first anti-slavery fair, which abolitionists held in Boston in 1834. It was both an educational and a major fundraising event, and was held annually for decades, organized under Maria Weston Chapman. In 1839, Child was elected to the executive committee of the American Anti-Slavery Society (AASS), and became editor of the society's National Anti-Slavery Standard in 1840. In doing so, she became the first woman to edit a national political paper.

While she was editor of the National Anti-Slavery Standard, Child wrote a weekly column for the paper called "Letters from New-York", which she later compiled and published in book form. Child's management as editor and the popularity of her "Letters from New-York" column both helped to establish the National Anti-Slavery Standard as one of the most popular abolitionist newspapers in the US. She edited the Standard until 1843, when her husband took her place as editor-in-chief. She acted as his assistant until May 1844. During their stay in New York, the Childs were close friends of Isaac T. Hopper, a Quaker abolitionist and prison reformer. After leaving New York, the Childs settled in Wayland, Massachusetts, where they spent the rest of their lives. Here, they provided shelter for runaway slaves trying to escape the Fugitive Slave Law. Child also served as a member of the executive board of the American Anti-Slavery Society during the 1840s and 1850s, alongside Lucretia Mott and Maria Weston Chapman.

During this period, she also wrote short stories, exploring, through fiction, the complex issues of slavery. Examples include "The Quadroons" (1842) and "Slavery's Pleasant Homes: A Faithful Sketch" (1843). She wrote anti-slavery fiction to reach people beyond what she could do in tracts. She also used it to address issues of sexual exploitation, which affected both the enslaved persons and the slaveholder family. In both cases she found women suffered from the power of men. The more closely Child addressed some of the abuses, the more negative the reaction she received from her readers. She published an anti-slavery tract, The Duty of Disobedience to the Fugitive Slave Act: An Appeal to the Legislators of Massachusetts, in 1860.

Eventually Child left the National Anti-Slavery Standard, because she refused to promote violence as an acceptable weapon for battling slavery.

"Over the River and Through the Wood" (1844) as performed by Grant Raymond Barrett, 2006

She did continue to write for many newspapers and periodicals during the 1840s, and she promoted greater equality for women. However, because of her negative experience with the AASS, she never worked again in organized movements or societies for women's rights or suffrage. In 1844, Child published the poem "The New-England Boy's Song about Thanksgiving Day" in Flowers for Children, Volume 2, that became famous as the song "Over the River and Through the Wood".

In the 1850s, Child responded to the near-fatal beating on the Senate floor of her good friend Charles Sumner, an abolitionist Senator from Massachusetts, by a South Carolina congressman, by writing her poem entitled "The Kansas Emigrants". The outbreak of violence in Kansas between anti- and pro-slavery settlers, prior to voting on whether the territory should be admitted as a free or slave state, resulted in Child changing her opinion about the use of violence. Along with Angelina Grimké Weld, another proponent for peace, she acknowledged the need for the use of violence to protect anti-slavery emigrants in Kansas. Child also sympathized with the radical abolitionist John Brown. While she did not condone his violence, she deeply admired his courage and conviction in the raid on Harper's Ferry. She wrote to Virginia Governor Henry A. Wise asking for permission to travel to Charles Town to nurse Brown, but although Wise had no objection, Brown did not accept her offer.

In 1860, Child was invited to write a preface to Harriet Jacobs's slave narrative, Incidents in the Life of a Slave Girl. She met Jacobs and not only agreed to write the preface but also became the editor of the book.

=== Native American rights work ===
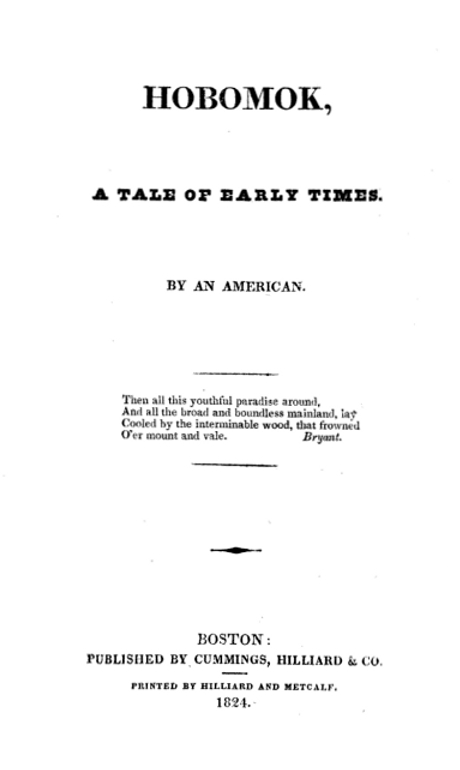
Title page of Hobomok, 1824

Child published her first novel, the historical romance Hobomok, A Tale of Early Times, anonymously under the gender-neutral pseudonym "an American". The plot centers on the interracial marriage between a white woman and a Native American man, who have a son together. The heroine later remarries, reintegrating herself and her child into Puritan society. The issue of miscegenation caused a scandal in the literary community and the book was not a critical success.

During the 1860s, Child wrote pamphlets on Native American rights. The most prominent, An Appeal for the Indians (1868), called upon government officials, as well as religious leaders, to bring justice to American Indians. Her presentation sparked Peter Cooper's interest in Indian issues. It contributed to the founding of the U.S. Board of Indian Commissioners and the subsequent Peace Policy in the administration of Ulysses S. Grant.

=== Freethought beliefs ===
Born to a strict Calvinist father, Child slept with a bible under her pillow when she was young. However, although she joined the Unitarians in 1820, as an adult she was not active in that, or any other, church. In 1855 she published the 3-volume "The Progress of Religious Ideas Through Successive Ages", within which she rejected traditional theology, dogma, and doctrines and repudiated the concept of revelation and creeds as the basis for moral action, arguing instead "It is impossible to exaggerate the evil work that theology has done in the world" and, in commenting on the efforts of theologians, "What a blooming paradise would the whole earth be if the same amount of intellect, labor, and zeal had been expended on science, agriculture, and the arts!"

Child's An Appeal in Favor of that Class of Americans Called Africans pushed for emancipation by highlighting the life of an enslaved Muslim man named Ben Solomon. In underscoring Ben Solomon's excellence and intelligence as an Arabic teacher and a man of Muslim faith, Child not only drove racial acceptance but religious acceptance as well.

== Personal life ==
Lydia Francis taught school until 1828, when she married Boston lawyer David Lee Child. His political activism and involvement in reform introduced her to the social reforms of Indian rights and Garrisonian abolitionism. She was a long-time friend of activist Margaret Fuller and frequent participant in Fuller's "conversations" held at Elizabeth Palmer Peabody's North Street bookstore in Boston.

Child died in Wayland, Massachusetts, aged 78, on October 20, 1880, at her home at 91 Old Sudbury Road. She was buried at North Cemetery in Wayland. At her funeral, abolitionist Wendell Phillips shared the opinion of many within the abolition movement who knew her, "We felt that neither fame, nor gain, nor danger, nor calumny had any weight with her."

== Legacy ==
- Child's friend, Harriet Winslow Sewall, arranged Child's letters for publication after her death.
- The first volume of History of Woman Suffrage, published in 1881, states, “THESE VOLUMES ARE AFFECTIONATELY INSCRIBED TO THE Memory of Mary Wollstonecraft, Frances Wright, Lucretia Mott, Harriet Martineau, Lydia Maria Child, Margaret Fuller, Sarah and Angelina Grimké, Josephine S. Griffing, Martha C. Wright, Harriot K. Hunt, M.D., Mariana W. Johnson, Alice and Phebe Carey, Ann Preston, M.D., Lydia Mott, Eliza W. Farnham, Lydia F. Fowler, M.D., Paulina Wright Davis, Whose Earnest Lives and Fearless Words, in Demanding Political Rights for Women, have been, in the Preparation of these Pages, a Constant Inspiration TO The Editors”.
- The Liberty ship Lydia M. Child, named after Child, was launched on January 31, 1943, and saw service during World War II.
- Child was inducted into the National Women's Hall of Fame in 2007.
- In 2007, Child was inducted into the National Abolition Hall of Fame, in Peterboro, New York.

== Writings ==
- Hobomok, A Tale of Early Times. 1824
- Evenings in New England: Intended for Juvenile Amusement and Instruction. 1824
- The Rebels; or, Boston Before the Revolution (1825). 1850 ed.
- The Juvenile Miscellany, a children's periodical (editor, 1826–1834)
- The First Settlers of New-England: Or, Conquest of the Pequods, Narragansets and Pokanokets As Related by a Mother to Her Children. 1829.
- The Indian Wife. 1828.
- The Frugal Housewife: Dedicated to Those Who are Not Ashamed of Economy, a book of kitchen, economy and directions (1829; 33rd edition 1855) 1832
- The Mother's Book (1831), an early American instructional book on child rearing, republished in England and Germany
- Coronal. 1831. A collection of verses
- The American Frugal Housewife: Dedicated to those who are not ashamed of Economy (1832) 1841
- The Biographies of Madame de Staël, and Madame Roland. 1832.
- The Ladies' Family Library, a series of biographies (5 vols., 1832–1835)
- Child, Lydia Maria (1833). The Girl's Own Book.
  - The Girl's Own Book, new ed. by Mrs. R. Valentine. London: William Tegg, 1863
- An Appeal in Favor of that Class of Americans Called Africans 1833
- The Oasis. 1834.
- The History of the Condition of Women in Various Ages and Nations. 1835. (two volumes).
- Philothea. 1836. A romance of Greece set in the days of Pericles
- The Family Nurse. 1837.
- The Liberty Bell. 1842. Includes stories such as The Quadroons
- Slavery's Pleasant Homes: A Faithful Sketch. 1843. A short story
- Letters from New-York, written for the National Anti-Slavery Standard while Child was the editor (2 vols., 1841–1843)
- "The New-England Boy's Song about Thanksgiving Day" (1844), later known by its opening line, "Over the River and Through the Wood". A poem originally published in Flowers for Children, vol. 2. Text of poem
- "Hilda Silfverling: A Fantasy". 1845
- Flowers for Children (3 vols., 1844–1846)
- Fact and Fiction. 1846.
- Rose Marian and the Flower Fairies. 1850.
- The Power of Kindness. Philadelphia, Pennsylvania: Willis P. Hazard. 1851.
- The Progress of Religious Ideas, Through Successive Ages, an ambitious work, showing great diligence, but containing much that is inaccurate (3 vols., New York, 1855)
- Isaac T. Hopper: A True Life. 1853.
- Autumnal Leaves. 1857.
- A Few Scenes from a True History. 1858.
- Child, Lydia Maria (1860). Correspondence between Lydia Maria Child and Gov. Wise and Mrs. Mason, of Virginia. Boston: American Anti-Slavery Society.
- The right way the safe way: proved by emancipation in the British West Indies, and elsewhere. 1860.
- Looking Toward Sunset. 1864.
- The Freedmen's Book. 1865.
- A Romance of the Republic. 1867. A novel promoting interracial marriage
- An Appeal for the Indians. 1868.
- Aspirations of the World. 1878.
- A volume of her letters, with an introduction by John G. Whittier and an appendix by Wendell Phillips, was published after her death (Boston: Houghton, Mifflin, 1882)
- Lydia Maria Child: Selected Letters, 1817-1880 (Meltzer, Milton, and Holland, Patricia G., eds.). Amherst, MA: University of Massachusetts Press, 1982
- Masur, Louis P., ed. "Lydia Maria Child (1802-1880)," in "... the real war will never get in the books": Selections from Writers During the Civil War, New York and Oxford: Oxford University Press, 1993, pp. 39–55. Contains twelve letters from Childs about slavery, written from 1861 to 1865, and the chapter "Advice from an Old Friend" (to the freed slaves) from Childs' The Freedmen's Book.

== See also ==
- Edward Strutt Abdy
- Over the River...Life of Lydia Maria Child, Abolitionist for Freedom (2008). Documentary, narrated by Diahann Carroll.
