= Paul Curtis =

Paul Curtis may refer to:

- Paul Curtis (footballer) (born 2003), Australian rules footballer
- Paul Curtis (ice hockey) (born 1947), Canadian ice hockey defenceman
- Paul Curtis (musician) (born 1950), English singer, songwriter and record producer
- Paul Curtis (shipbuilder) (1800–1873), American shipbuilder
- Paul Curtis House, house in Medford, Massachusetts, USA
