= Juvenile Miscellany =

American bimonthly children's magazine

The Juvenile Miscellany
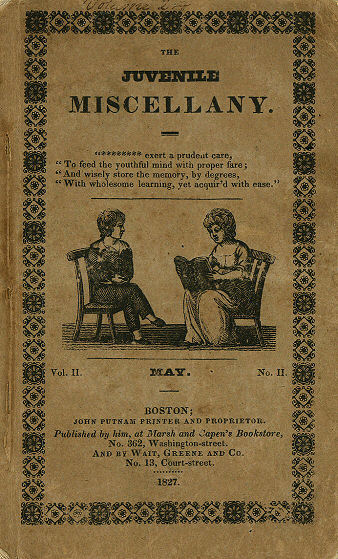
- Cover, May 1827
- Editor: Lydia Maria Child (1826-1834); Sarah Josepha Hale (1834-1836)
- Categories: Children's magazine
- Frequency: Bimonthly
- Publisher: Putnam & Hunt
- Founder: Lydia Maria Child
- Founded: 1826
- First issue: September 1826
- Final issue: December 1836
- Country: United States
- Based in: Boston, Massachusetts
- Language: English

The Juvenile Miscellany was a 19th-century American bimonthly children's magazine published in Boston, Massachusetts between 1826 and 1836. It was founded by Lydia Maria Child. Publishers varied over the years, but the original publisher was John Putnam. Sarah Josepha Hale edited the magazine as a monthly between September 1834 and April 1836.

== History ==
The magazine was founded in 1826 by Lydia Maria Child. She supervised its bimonthly publication between September 1826 and August 1834. Child's interest in abolitionism and the publication in 1833 of her antislavery book, An Appeal in Favor of that Class of Americans Called Africans, led to Child being socially shunned. Subscriptions to the magazine dropped off. Child left her editorial position.

Child wrote in the magazine to child readers when leaving the magazine in 1834: "After conducting the Miscellany for eight years, I am now compelled to bid a reluctant and most affectionate farewell to my little readers. May God bless you, my young friends, and impress deeply upon your hearts the conviction that all true excellence and happiness consists in living for others, not for yourselves. ... I intend hereafter to write other books for your amusement and instruction; and I part from you with less pain, because I hope that God will enable me to be a medium of use to you, in some other form than the Miscellany."

== Content ==
The magazine's content emphasized middle class Protestant values. It featured poems, stories, puzzles, and informative articles. The magazine was didactic. It provided amusement and imparted moral lessons while avoiding the piety so common in children's literature of the period.

The magazine was ground-breaking. The Oxford Encyclopedia of Children's Literature writes, "The calm security of the lives of the children in the stories, the affection they receive, and their childishness were something new in American writing."

The writers who contributed to its pages included Eliza Leslie, Catharine Maria Sedgwick, Lydia Huntley Sigourney, Hannah Flagg Gould, Sarah Josepha Hale, Caroline Howard Gilman, and Anna Maria Wells. Child herself contributed as "Aunt Maria".

== Response ==
The magazine was hugely popular. Within four months of its debut, the magazine had 850 subscribers. While stories stressed the Protestant ethic, they were never boring. Caroline Healy Dall wrote in the Unitarian Review in 1883:

"No child who read the Juvenile Miscellany ... will ever forget the excitement that the appearance of each number caused. ... The children sat on the stone steps of their house doors all the way up and down Chestnut Street in Boston, waiting for the carrier. He used to cross the street, going from door to door in a zigzag fashion; and the fortunate possessor of the first copy found a crowd of little ones hanging over her shoulder from the steps above. ... How forlorn we were if the carrier was late!"
