= Diahann Carroll =

American actress and singer (1935–2019)

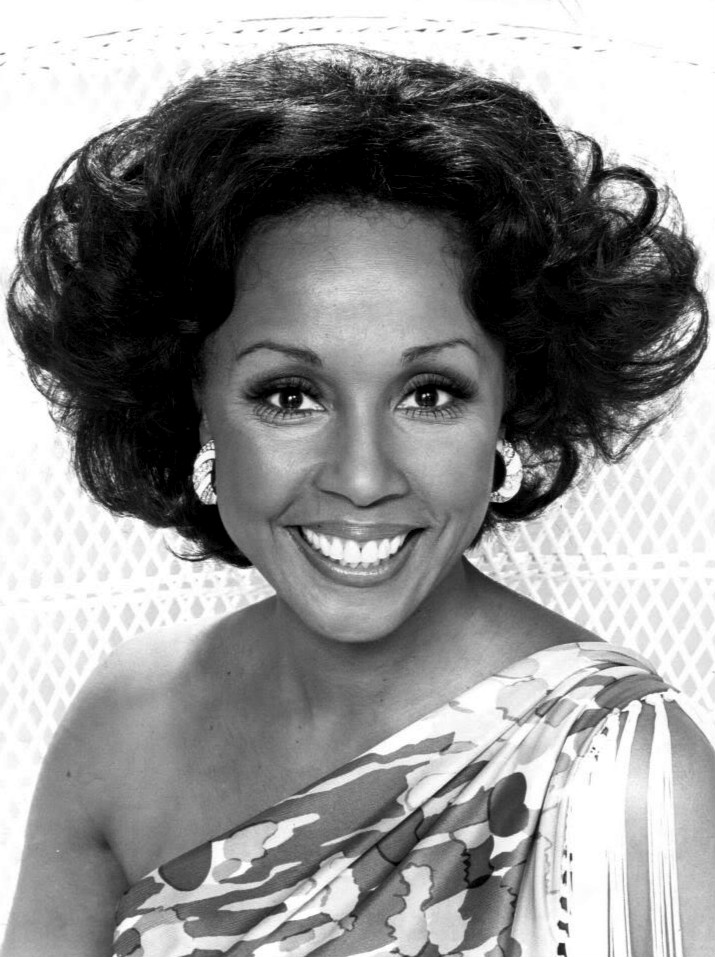
- Publicity photo, 1976
- Born: Carol Diann Johnson; July 17, 1935; New York City, U.S.
- Died: October 4, 2019 (aged 84); West Hollywood, California, U.S.
- Education: New York University
- Occupations: Actress; singer; model; activist
- Years active: 1950–2016
- Spouses: Monte Kay (m. 1956; div. 1963); Fred Glusman (m. 1973; div. 1973); Robert DeLeon (m. 1975; died 1977); Vic Damone (m. 1987; div. 1996)
- Partners: Sidney Poitier (1959–1968); David Frost (1970–1973)
- Children: 1

Diahann Carroll (/daɪˈæn/ dy-AN; born Carol Diann Johnson; July 17, 1935 – October 4, 2019) was an American actress, singer, model, and activist. Carroll was the recipient of numerous nominations and awards for her stage and screen performances, including a Tony Award in 1962, Golden Globe Award in 1968, an Academy Award nomination in 1974, and five Emmy Award nominations between 1963 and 2008.

Carroll rose to prominence in some of the earliest major studio films to feature black casts during the Golden Age of Hollywood, including the classic movie musicals Carmen Jones (1954) and Porgy and Bess (1959). She received an Academy Award for Best Actress nomination for her title role in the romantic comedy-drama film Claudine (1974). Carroll's other notable film credits include Paris Blues (1961), The Split (1968), Eve's Bayou (1997), and Having Our Say: The Delany Sisters First 100 Years (1999).

She starred in the title role in Julia (1968–1971), for which she received a Golden Globe Award for Best TV Star – Female. The series- in which Carroll played a nurse at a doctor's office at an aerospace company- was the first on American television to star a Black woman whose character was not a servant or slave. She played the role of diva Dominique Deveraux in the prime time soap opera Dynasty from 1984 to 1987. She also had roles in Naked City, A Different World, and Grey's Anatomy.

Carroll made her Broadway debut playing Ottilie Alias Violet in the musical House of Flowers (1954). She became the first African American woman to win the Tony Award for Best Actress in a Musical for her role as Barbara Woodruff in the musical No Strings (1962).

== Early years ==
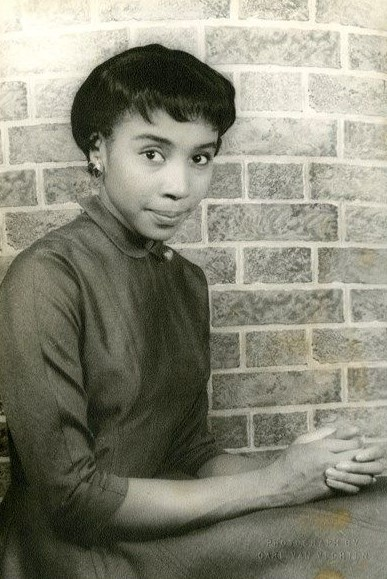
Carroll, by Carl Van Vechten, 1955

Carol Diann Johnson was born on July 17, 1935, in the Bronx, New York City. Her parents were John Johnson, a subway conductor, and Mabel (née Faulk), a nurse. While Carroll was still an infant, the family moved to Harlem, where she grew up except for a brief period in which her parents left her with an aunt in North Carolina. She attended Music and Art High School, and was a classmate of Billy Dee Williams. In many interviews about her childhood, Carroll recalls her parents' support, and their enrolling her in dance, singing, and modeling classes. By the time Carroll was 15, she was modeling for Ebony. "She also began entering television contests, including Arthur Godfrey's Talent Scouts, under the name Diahann Carroll." After graduating from high school, she attended New York University, where she majored in sociology, "but she left before graduating to pursue a show-business career, promising her family that if the career did not materialize after two years, she would return to college."

== Career ==
Carroll's big break came at the age of 18, when she appeared as a contestant on the DuMont Television Network program, Chance of a Lifetime, hosted by Dennis James. On the show, which aired January 8, 1954, she took the $1,000 top prize for a rendition of the Jerome Kern/Oscar Hammerstein song, "Why Was I Born?" She went on to win the following four weeks. Engagements at Manhattan's Café Society and Latin Quarter nightclubs soon followed.

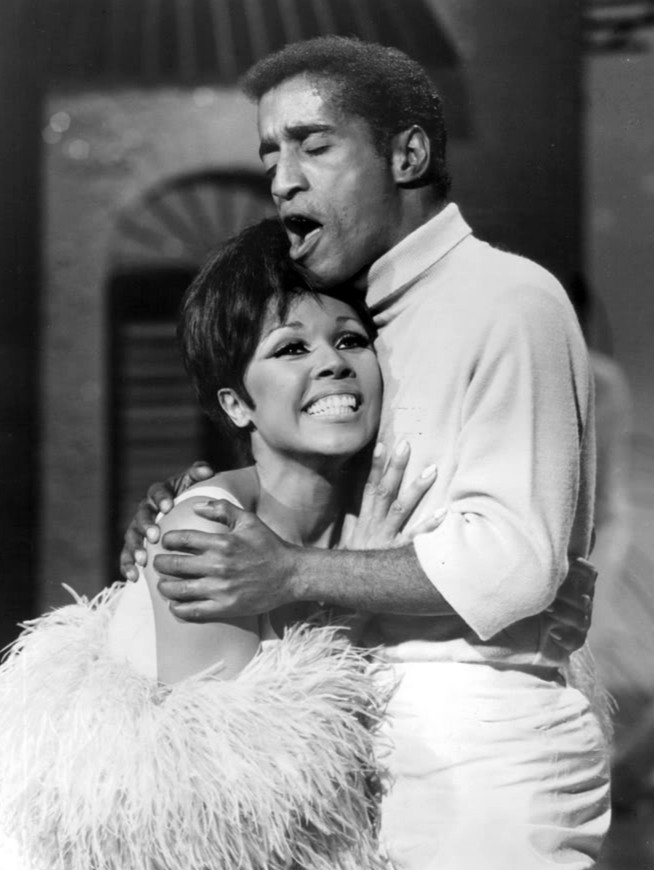
Carroll and Sammy Davis Jr. on The Hollywood Palace, 1968

Carroll's film debut was a supporting role in Carmen Jones (1954), as a friend to the sultry lead character played by Dorothy Dandridge. That same year, she starred in the Broadway musical, House of Flowers. A few years later, she played Clara in the film version of George Gershwin's Porgy and Bess (1959), but her character's singing parts were dubbed by opera singer Loulie Jean Norman. The following year, Carroll made a guest appearance in the series Peter Gunn, in the episode "Sing a Song of Murder" (1960). In the next two years, she starred with Sidney Poitier, Paul Newman, and Joanne Woodward in the film Paris Blues (1961) and won the 1962 Tony Award for Best Actress in a Musical (the first time for a Black woman) for portraying Barbara Woodruff in the Samuel A. Taylor and Richard Rodgers musical No Strings. Twelve years later, she was nominated for an Academy Award for Best Actress for her starring role alongside James Earl Jones in the film Claudine (1974), which part had been written specifically for actress Diana Sands (who had made guest appearances on Julia as Carroll's cousin Sara), but shortly before filming was to begin, Sands learned she was terminally ill with cancer. Sands attempted to carry on with the role, but as filming began, she became too ill to continue and recommended her friend Carroll take over the role. Sands died in September 1973, before the film's release in April 1974.

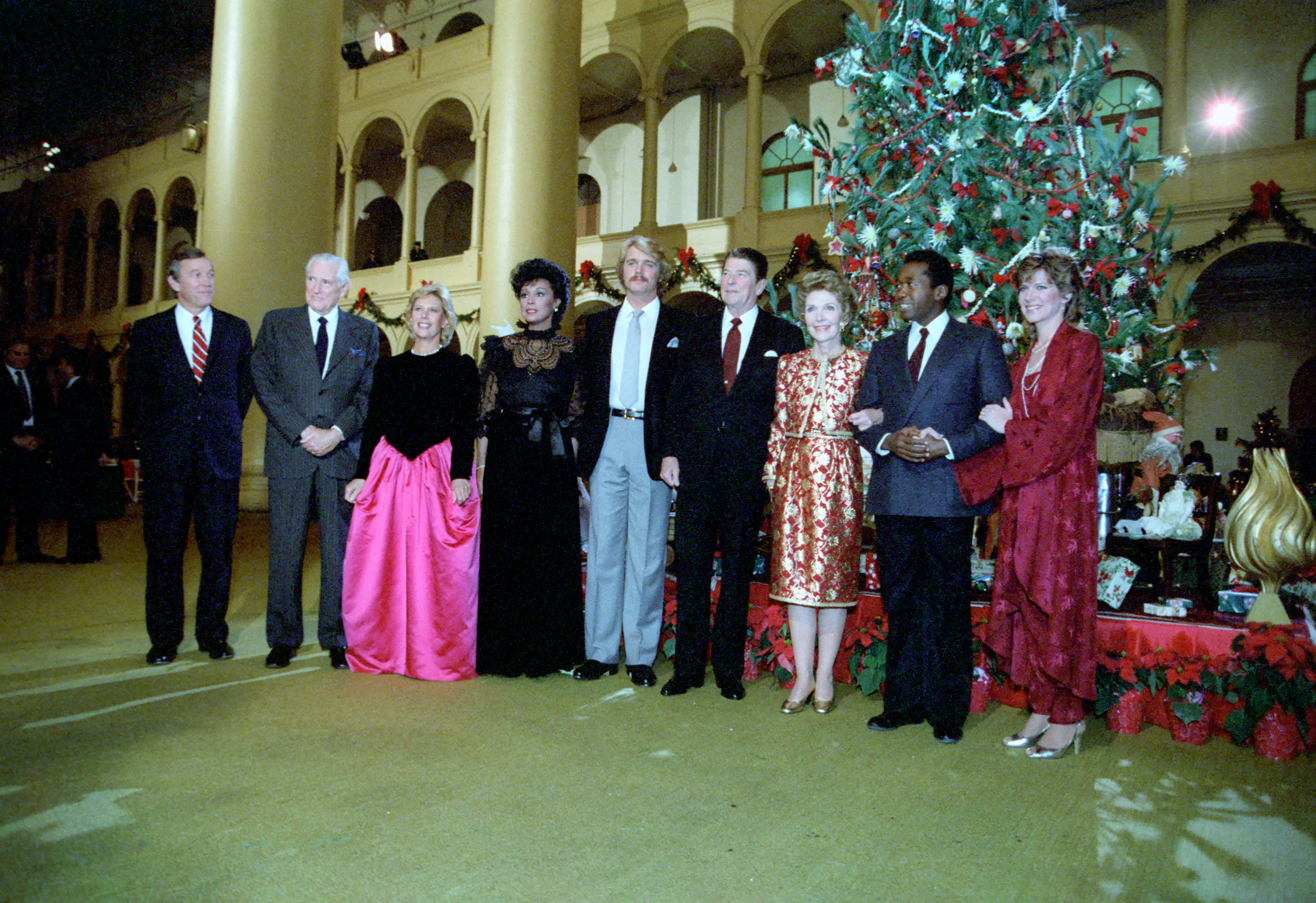
Carroll with U.S. President Ronald Reagan, First Lady Nancy Reagan, and other stars at NBC's taping of its "Christmas in Washington" in Washington, D.C.

Carroll is known for her titular role in the television series Julia (1968–71), which made her the first African-American actress in a television series starring role that was not of a domestic worker. That role won her the Golden Globe Award for Best TV Star – Female for its first year, and a nomination for an Primetime Emmy Award in 1969. Some of Carroll's earlier work also included appearances on shows hosted by Johnny Carson, Judy Garland, Merv Griffin, Jack Paar, and Ed Sullivan, and on The Hollywood Palace variety show. In 1984, Carroll joined the nighttime soap opera Dynasty at the end of its fourth season as the mixed-race jet set diva Dominique Deveraux, Blake Carrington's half-sister. Her high-profile role on Dynasty also reunited her with her schoolmate Billy Dee Williams, who briefly played her onscreen husband Brady Lloyd. Carroll remained on the show and made several appearances on its short-lived spin-off, The Colbys until she departed at the end of the seventh season in 1987. In 1989, she began the recurring role of Marion Gilbert, Whitley Gilbert's mother, in A Different World, for which she received her third Emmy nomination that same year.

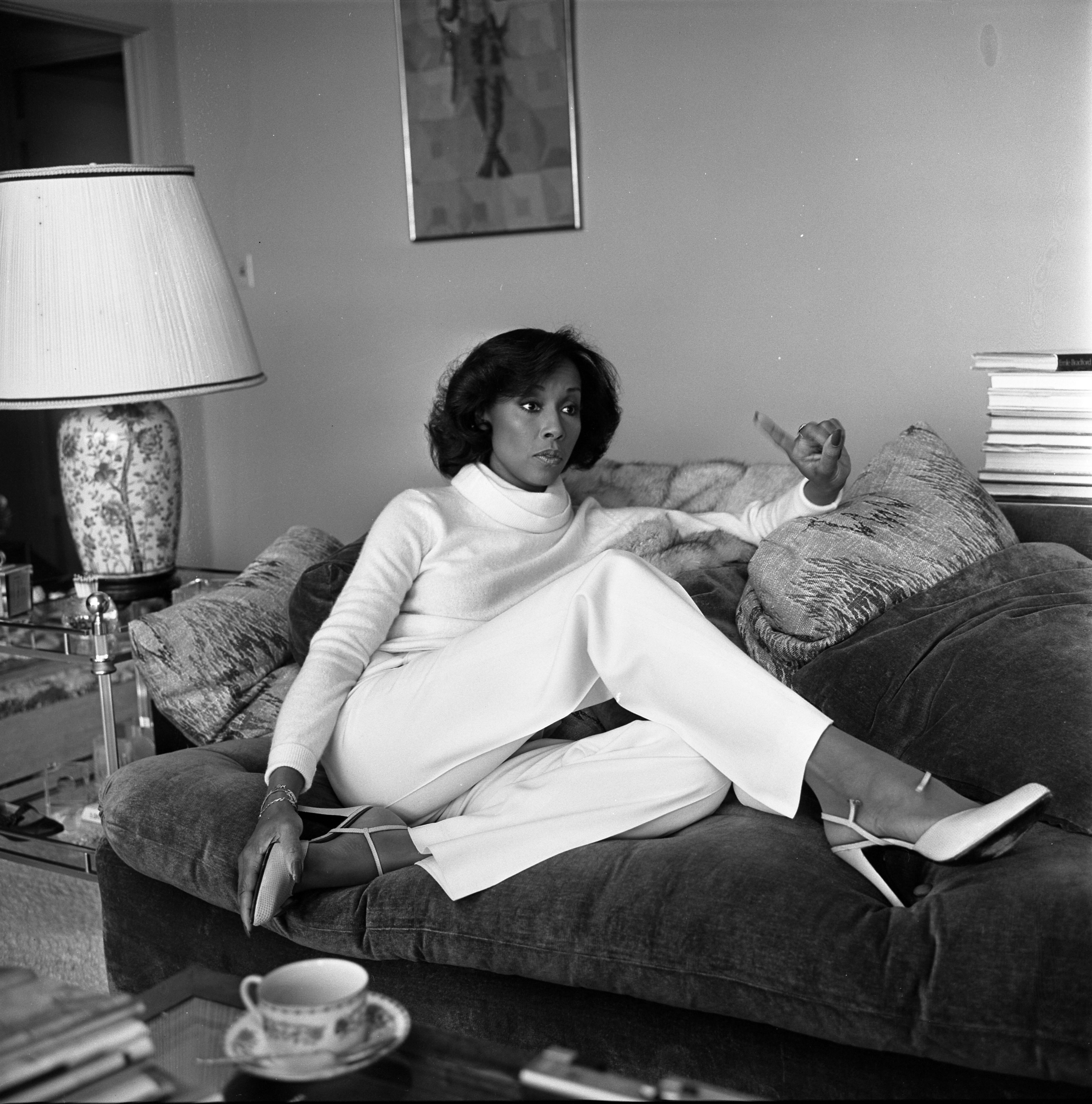
Carroll in 1979

In 1991, Carroll portrayed Eleanor Potter, the doting, concerned, and protective wife of Jimmy Potter (portrayed by Chuck Patterson), in the musical drama film The Five Heartbeats (1991), also featuring actor and musician Robert Townsend and Michael Wright. She reunited with Billy Dee Williams again in 1995, portraying his character's wife Mrs. Greyson in Lonesome Dove: The Series. The following year, Carroll starred as the self-loving, egotistical, corrupt, manipulative and deceptive silent movie star Norma Desmond in the Canadian production of Andrew Lloyd Webber's musical version of the film Sunset Boulevard. In 2001, Carroll made her animation debut in The Legend of Tarzan, in which she voiced Queen La, ruler of the ancient city of Opar.

In 2006, Carroll appeared in several episodes of the television medical drama Grey's Anatomy as Jane Burke, the demanding mother of Dr. Preston Burke. From 2008 to 2014, she appeared on USA Network's series White Collar in the recurring role of June, the savvy widow who rents out her guest room to Neal Caffrey. In 2010, Carroll was featured in UniGlobe Entertainment's breast cancer docudrama titled 1 a Minute, and appeared as Nana in two Lifetime movie adaptations of Patricia Cornwell novels: At Risk and The Front.

In 2013, Carroll was present on stage at the 65th Primetime Emmy Awards to briefly speak about being the first African-American nominated for a Primetime Emmy Award. She was quoted as saying about Kerry Washington, nominated for Scandal, "she better get this award."

== Personal life ==
Carroll was married four times. Her first marriage was to record producer Monte Kay, which was presided over by Adam Clayton Powell Jr. at the Abyssinian Baptist Church in Harlem. Her father did not attend the ceremony, because he disapproved of marrying a white Jew but later reconcilled with Carroll. Carroll gave birth to her daughter, Suzanne Kay (born September 9, 1960), who became a journalist and screenwriter.The marriage ended in 1962.

In 1959, Carroll began a nine-year affair with the married actor Sidney Poitier. In her autobiography, Carroll said Poitier persuaded her to divorce her husband and said he would leave his wife to be with her. While she proceeded with her divorce, Poitier did not keep his part of the bargain. Eventually he divorced his wife. According to Poitier, their relationship ended because he wanted to live with Carroll for six months without her daughter present so he would not be "jumping from one marriage straight into another." She refused.

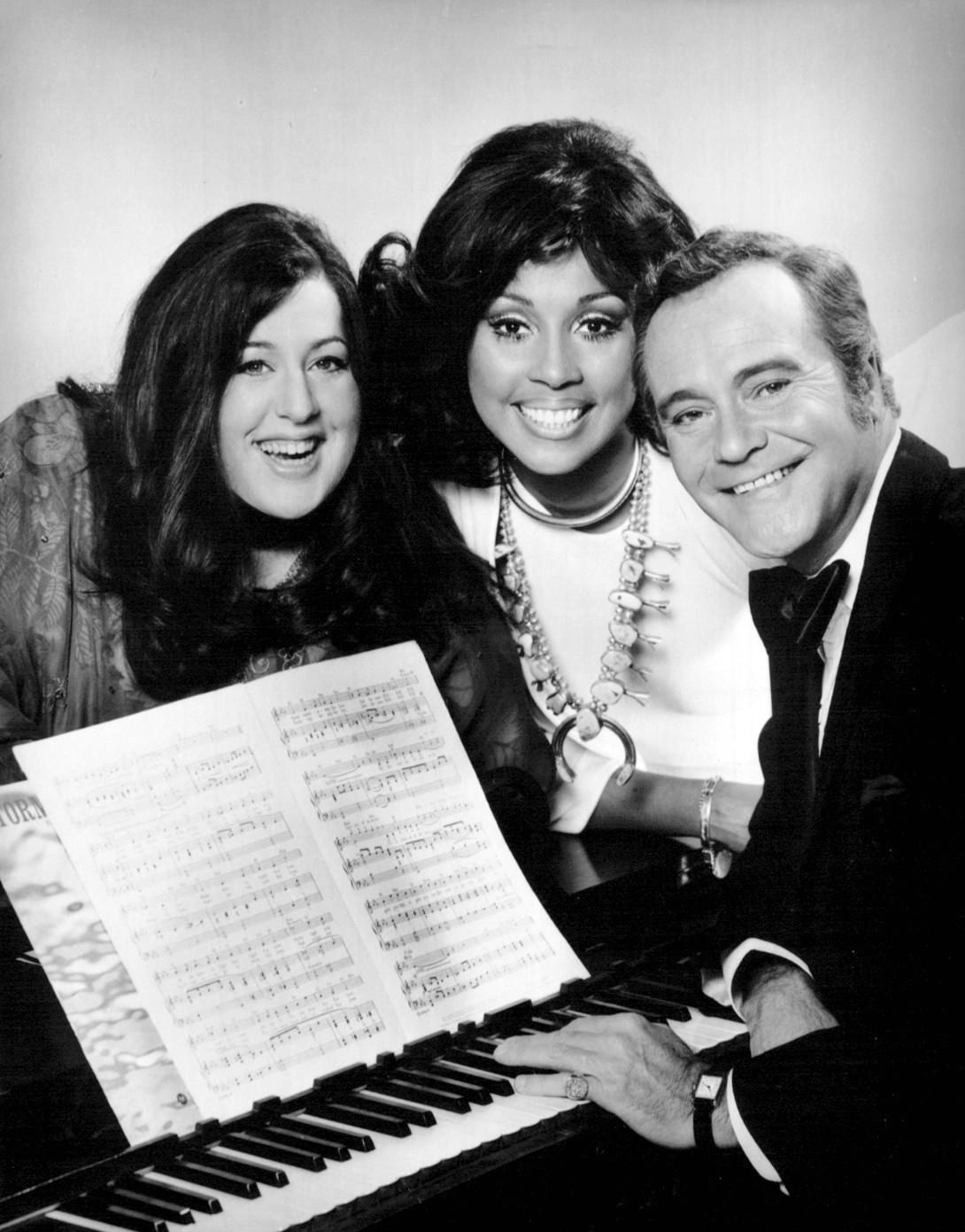
From left to right: Cass Elliot, Carroll and Jack Lemmon in 1973

Carroll dated and was engaged to British television host and producer David Frost from 1970 until 1973. In February 1973, Carroll surprised the press by marrying Las Vegas boutique owner Fred Glusman. After four months of marriage, Glusman filed for divorce in June 1973. Carroll filed a response, but did not contest the divorce, which was finalized two months later. Glusman was reportedly physically abusive.

On May 25, 1975, Carroll, then aged 39, married Robert DeLeon (1950–1977), the 24-year-old managing editor of Jet magazine. They met when DeLeon assigned himself to a cover story on Carroll about her 1975 Oscar nomination for Claudine. DeLeon had a daughter, Monica, from a previous marriage. Carroll moved to Chicago where Jet was headquartered, but DeLeon soon quit his job so the couple relocated to Oakland. Carroll was widowed when DeLeon died in a car crash in Beverly Hills on March 31, 1977.

Carroll's fourth and final marriage was to singer Vic Damone in 1987. The union, which Carroll admitted was turbulent, had a legal separation in 1991, reconciliation, and divorce in 1996.

=== Charitable work ===
Carroll was a founding member of the Celebrity Action Council, a volunteer group of celebrity women who served the women's outreach of the Los Angeles Mission, working with women in rehabilitation from problems with alcohol, drugs, or prostitution. She helped to form the group along with other female television personalities including Mary Frann, Linda Gray, Donna Mills, and Joan Van Ark.

== Illness and death ==
Carroll was diagnosed with breast cancer in 1997. She said the diagnosis "stunned" her, because there was no family history of breast cancer, and she had always led a healthy lifestyle. She underwent nine weeks of radiation therapy and had been clear for years after the diagnosis. She frequently spoke of the need for early detection and prevention of the disease. She died from natural causes at her home in West Hollywood, California, on October 4, 2019, at the age of 84. Carroll also suffered from another form of cancer and dementia at the time of her death, which was unrelated, though actor Marc Copage, who played her character's son on Julia, said that she did not appear to show serious signs of cognitive decline as of late 2017.

== Filmography ==
=== Film ===
Year	Title	Role	Notes
1954	Carmen Jones	Myrt	
1959	Porgy and Bess	Clara	
1961	Goodbye Again	Night Club Singer	
1961	Paris Blues	Connie Lampson	
1967	Hurry Sundown	Vivian Turlow	
1968	The Split	Ellen "Ellie" Kennedy	
1974	Claudine	Claudine	
1982	Sister, Sister	Carolyne Lovejoy	
1990	Mo' Better Blues	Jazz Club Singer	Uncredited
1991	The Five Heartbeats	Eleanor Potter	
1992	Color Adjustment	Herself	
1997	Eve's Bayou	Elzora	
2013	Tyler Perry Presents Peeples	Nana Peeples	
2016	The Masked Saint	Ms. Edna	(final film role)

=== Television ===
Year	Title	Role	Notes	Ref
1954	Chance of a Lifetime	Herself	Four consecutive weeks as a contestant	
1954	The Red Skelton Hour	Herself	1 episode	
1955	General Electric Theater	Anna	Episode: "Winner by Decision"	
1957–61	The Jack Paar Tonight Show	Herself	28 episodes	
1957–68	The Ed Sullivan Show	Herself	9 episodes	
1959–62	The Garry Moore Show	Herself	8 episodes	
1960	Peter Gunn	Dina Wright	Episode: "Sing a Song of Murder"	
1960	The Man in the Moon		TV movie	
1962	What's My Line?	Mystery Guest	Episode: Diahann Carroll	
1962	Naked City	Ruby Jay	Episode: "A Horse Has a Big Head!"	
1963	The Eleventh Hour	Stella Young	Episode: "And God Created Vanity"	
1963–75	The Merv Griffin Show	Herself	2 episodes	
1964	The Judy Garland Show	Herself	Episode 21	
1964–69	The Hollywood Palace	Herself	10 episodes	
1965	The Dean Martin Show	Herself	1 episode (First Dean Martin Show)	
1967–71	The Carol Burnett Show	Herself	2 episodes	
1968–71	Julia	Julia Baker	86 episodes	
1972–86	The Dick Cavett Show	Herself	3 episodes	
1972	The New Bill Cosby Show	Herself	1 episode	
1975	Death Scream	Betty May	TV movie	
1976	The Diahann Carroll Show	Herself	4 episodes	
1977	The Love Boat	Roxy Blue	Episode: "Isaac the Groupie"	
1977–78	Hollywood Squares	Herself	11 episodes	
1978	Star Wars Holiday Special	Mermeia Holographic	TV special	
1979	Roots: The Next Generations	Zeona Haley	Episode: Part VI (1939-1950)	
1979	I Know Why the Caged Bird Sings	Vivian	TV movie	
1982	Sister, Sister	Carolyne Lovejoy	TV movie	
1984–87	Dynasty	Dominique Deveraux	74 episodes	
1985–86	The Colbys	Dominique Deveraux	7 episodes	
1989	From the Dead of Night	Maggie	TV movie	
1989–93	A Different World	Marion Gilbert	9 episodes	
1990	Murder in Black and White	Margo Stover	TV movie	
1991	Sunday in Paris	Vernetta Chase	TV short	
1993	The Sinbad Show	Mrs. Winters	Episode: "My Daughter's Keeper"	
1994	Burke's Law	Grace Gibson	Episode: "Who Killed the Beauty Queen?"	
1994	Evening Shade	Ginger	Episode: "The Perfect Woman"	
1994–95	Lonesome Dove: The Series	Ida Grayson	7 episodes	
1994	A Perry Mason Mystery: The Case of the Lethal Lifestyle	Lydia Bishop	TV movie	
1995	Touched by an Angel	Grace Willis	Episode: "The Driver"	
1998	The Sweetest Gift	Mrs. Wilson	TV movie	
1999	Having Our Say: The Delany Sisters' First 100 Years	Sadie Delany	TV movie	
1999	Jackie's Back	Herself	TV movie	
1999	Twice in a Lifetime	Jael	2 episodes	
2000	The Courage to Love	Pouponne	TV movie	
2000	Sally Hemings: An American Scandal	Betty Hemings	Miniseries	
2000	Happily Ever After: Fairy Tales for Every Child	Crow	Episode: "Aesop's Fables: A Whodunit Musical"	
2000	Livin' for Love: The Natalie Cole Story	Maria Cole	TV movie	
2001	The Legend of Tarzan	Queen La	Voice, 3 episodes	
2002	The Court	Justice DeSett	6 episodes	
2002	Half & Half	Grandma Ruth Thorne	Episode: "The Big Thanks for Forgiving Episode"	
2003	Strong Medicine	Eve Morton	Episode: "Love and Let Die"	
2003–04	Soul Food	Aunt Ruthie	2 episodes	
2004	Whoopi	Viveca Rae	Episode: "Mother's Little Helper"	
2006–07	Grey's Anatomy	Jane Burke	5 episodes	
2008	Back to You	Sandra Jenkins	Episode: "Hug & Tell"	
2008	Over the River...Life of Lydia Maria Child, Abolitionist for Freedom	Narrator	Documentary	
2009–14	White Collar	June Ellington	25 episodes	
2010	At Risk	Nana Mary	TV movie	
2010	The Front	Nana Evelyn	TV movie	
2010	Diahann Carroll: The Lady. The Music. The Legend	Herself	Filmed live in concert in Palm Springs, California	
2010–11	Diary of a Single Mom	Jane Marco	7 episodes	

=== Theater ===
Year	Title	Role	Venue	Ref.
1954	House of Flowers	Ottillie (alias Violet)	Alvin Theatre, Broadway	
1962	No Strings	Barbara Woodroff	54th Street Theatre, Broadway	
1977	Same Time, Next Year	Doris	Huntington Hartford Theatre	
1979	Black Broadway	Performer	Benefit concert	
1983	Agnes of God	Dr. Martha Livingstone	Music Box Theatre, Broadway	
1990	Love Letters	Melissa Gardner	Los Angeles Production	
1995	Sunset Boulevard	Norma Desmond	Ford Centre, Toronto	
1999	The Vagina Monologues	Performer	Westside Theatre, Off-Broadway	
2004	Bubbling Brown Sugar	Performer	Theater of the Stars, Atlanta	
2004	On Golden Pond	Ethel	Kennedy Center, Washington D.C.	
2007	Both Sides Now	Performer	Feinstein's at the Regency, New York	

=== Discography ===
- Diahann Carroll Sings Harold Arlen Songs (1957)
- Best Beat Forward (1958)
- The Persian Room Presents Diahann Carroll (1959)
- Porgy and Bess (1959) (with the André Previn Trio)
- The Magic of Diahann Carroll (with the André Previn Trio) (1960)
- Fun Life (1961)
- The Modern Jazz Quartet, The Comedy (1962)
- Showstopper! (1962)
- The Fabulous Diahann Carroll (1962)
- You're Adorable: Love Songs for Children (1967)
- Nobody Sees Me Cry (1967)
- Diahann Carroll (1974)
- A Tribute to Ethel Waters (1978)
- The Time of My Life (1997)

== Awards and nominations ==
Year	Award	Category	Nominated work	Result	Ref.
1974	Academy Awards	Best Actress	Claudine	Nominated	
2016	American Black Film Festival	Hollywood Legacy Award	Herself	Honored	
1999	Daytime Emmy Awards	Outstanding Performer in a Children's Special	The Sweetest Gift	Nominated	
1963	Primetime Emmy Awards	Outstanding Single Performance by an Actress in a Leading Role	Naked City	Nominated	
1969	Primetime Emmy Awards	Outstanding Continued Performance by an Actress in a Leading Role in a Comedy Series	Julia	Nominated	
1989	Primetime Emmy Awards	Outstanding Guest Actress in a Comedy Series	A Different World	Nominated	
2008	Primetime Emmy Awards	Outstanding Guest Actress in a Drama Series	Grey's Anatomy	Nominated	
1968	Golden Globe Awards	Best TV Star – Female	Julia	Won	
1969	Golden Globe Awards	Best Actress in a Television Series – Musical or Comedy	Julia	Nominated	
1974	Golden Globe Awards	Best Actress in a Motion Picture – Musical or Comedy	Claudine	Nominated	
1963	Grammy Awards	Best Solo Vocal Performance, Female	No Strings	Nominated	
1966	Grammy Awards	Best Recording for Children	Love Songs for Children: "A" You're Adorable	Nominated	
1975	NAACP Image Award	Outstanding Actress in a Motion Picture	Claudine	Won	
2000	NAACP Image Award	Outstanding Actress in a Television Movie/Miniseries/Dramatic Special	Having Our Say: The Delany Sisters' First 100 Years	Nominated	
2005	NAACP Image Award	Outstanding Supporting Actress in a Drama Series	Soul Food	Nominated	
2012	NAACP Image Award	Outstanding Supporting Actress in a Drama Series	White Collar	Nominated	
2014	NAACP Image Award	Outstanding Supporting Actress in a Drama Series	White Collar	Nominated	
2011	Television Academy Hall of Fame		Herself	Inducted	
1962	Tony Awards	Best Leading Actress in a Musical	No Strings	Won (Note: Tied with Anna Maria Alberghetti for Carnival!.)	
1992	Women in Film	Crystal Award	Herself	Honored	
1998	Women in Film	Lucy Award	Herself	Honored	
