= Dudleian lectures =

Lectures on religion at Harvard University

The Dudleian lectures are a series of prestigious lectures on religion at Harvard University, where they are the oldest endowed lectureship.

== History ==
The lectures were endowed by Paul Dudley in 1750 with a sum of £133 6s 8d. Dudley specified that the topic of the lectures should rotate among four themes, so that students would hear each one before graduation:

1. The principles of natural religion.
2. The truths of scriptural revelation.
3. "The detecting and convicting and exposing the idolatry of the Romish church, their tyranny, usurpations, damnable heresies, fatal errors, abominable superstitions, and other crying wickedness in their high places".
4. "The validity of the presbyterial ordination of ministers" (specifically, in the form practiced at the time in Scotland and Geneva, and among Englishmen who opposed the episcopal ordination of the Church of England).

In accordance with these precepts, the Dudleian lecturers of the 18th century did faithfully promote the doctrines of New England's anti-authoritarian Low-Church Protestantism, and — as L.K. Gilbert argues — wedded them to principles of Enlightenment rationality by associating ecclesiastical with civil tyranny.

The lectures were held annually and without interruption from 1755 to 1857 when they were suspended by the board of trustees "in order that the Fund, now in their judgment insufficient to support the charge of the same, may accumulate." They began again in 1888.

By the 19th century, the virulent anti-Catholicism had been much tempered, and in the middle of the 20th century, Clifford K. Shipton could note that "for many years past it has not been deemed expedient by the college authorities to honor the donor’s wishes in this respect."

== Contemporary lectures ==
Contemporary Dudleian lectures tend to be highly academic in nature, and are often delivered by Catholic or non-Christian theologians or priests.

In a more ecumenical, less religiously polemical age the third topic has been reinterpreted to intend relations among the Christian denominations. The first Catholic who gave the Dudleian lecture under this rubric was Fr. Henri Nouwen.

Notable Dudleian lecturers have included Convers Francis, Jason Haven, William Ellery Channing, Reinhold Niebuhr, Paul Tillich, John LaFarge, Jr., Seyyed Hossein Nasr and Carlo Maria Martini.
