= The American Frugal Housewife =

American domestic manual published in 1829

The Frugal Housewife was a domestic manual published in 1829 in Boston by the American writer and activist Lydia Maria Child. The book was renamed The American Frugal Housewife from 1832 to avoid confusion with a book of the same name by the English author Susannah Carter.

== Author ==
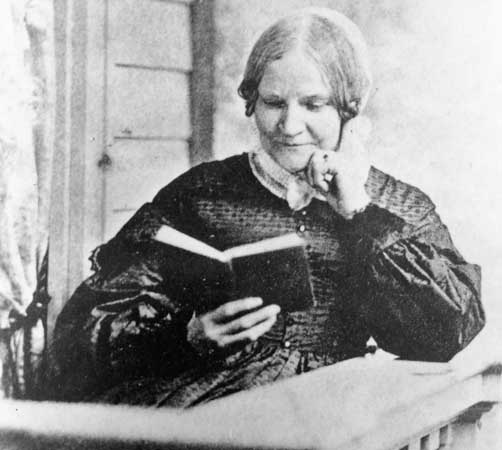
Child c. 1865

In the late 1820s, Lydia Maria Child was a writer of children's stories. Her husband, David Lee Child, was a lawyer and editor of the Massachusetts Whig Journal, which brought him little income but several libel suits and bad debts. This meant the task of supporting the couple fell on Lydia, who wrote prolifically but only made enough for a meagre existence.

== Content ==
The American Frugal Housewife contains advice on household management. Most of its space is taken up by recipes, with Child only including those she considered good value for money. This meant no preserves, as Child believed "Economical people will seldom use preserves, except for sickness. They are unhealthy, expensive, and useless to those who are well." Readers are told to make rather than purchase their cakes, and store and preserve their meats well. Making bread, Child warns, requires preparation in readying the fresh yeast in the days ahead. Various tips are included, including adding pearlash to yeast when it is too acidic but still active, testing if ovens are too hot by adding flour, leaving for a minute, and checking if it has blackened, and brushing the top of an oven with an old broom that has been wet to prevent pies and cakes burning on their tops.

Several essays on living frugally are contained. One chapter is dedicated to advising readers "How to Endure Poverty". Others tell stories of women who spend on goods beyond the essentials, who don't make friends they wouldn't otherwise have, and earn the ire of their husbands. Child advises: "a wife is never better beloved, because she teases for money." In the introduction, Child maintains that $600 is sufficient to comfortably support a family.

Several illustrations of animals taken from woodcuts appear, each labelled with the parts of the body corresponding to cuts of meat. The appearance of the animals differed from modern livestock produced through selective breeding: the legs of the pigs were longer, the sheep thinner, and the bulls smaller with long horns. Child's commitment to frugality meant the focus of such discussions was on using every part of the animal. The choice of meat purchased is emphasized as an important way households can support themselves frugally, through choosing to eat liver and round steaks rather than sirloin.

== Philosophy ==
Throughout The American Frugal Housewife, Child espouses a philosophy of frugality regarding time, money, and status-seeking as virtue rather than a response to necessity. Child dedicates the book on its cover to "those not ashamed of economy", and in its pages she writes passages such as "True economy is a careful treasurer in the service of benevolence; and where they are united, respectability, prosperity, and peace will follow". For Child, this frugality meant including recipes for food that was deliberately bland, using a limited selection of ingredients with the intention of helping people avoid going beyond their means or overindulging.

Such attitudes toward frugality were prevalent in 19th-century America, described by historian Susan Williams as a response to the aristocratic inclinations of European cookery. Cookbooks and advice manuals in America at the time were typically expensive, sourced from England, and targeted at wealthy readers. In the text and the attitudes of the day, this made frugality a patriotic, republican attribute.

== Release ==
The Frugal Housewife was released in 1829. From 1832, the book was retitled as The American Frugal Housewife; Child explained:

It has become necessary to change the title of this work to the "American Frugal Housewife," because there is an English work of the same name, not adapted to the wants of this country.

Such was the book's popularity that by 1834, The American Frugal Housewife was in its 14th edition, and by 1842, its 28th. No records of the income the book generated remain, although one estimate has earnings in the first two years as $2,000. By the 1980s, The American Frugal Housewife had been published in 54 editions: 33 in the United States, 12 in England, and 9 in Germany.

Editions included:

- Sixth edition, Boston: Carter, Hendee and Babcock, 1831.
- Eighth edition, London: T. Tegg and Son, 1832.
- Fourteenth edition, London: T. Tegg and Son, 1834.

== Sources ==
=== Books ===
- Child, Lydia Maria (1832). The American Frugal Housewife (12th ed.). Boston, Massachusetts: Carter & Hendee.
- Kraig, Bruce (2017). A Rich and Fertile Land: A History of Food in America. Foods and nations. London: Reaktion Books. ISBN 978-1-78023-853-1.
- McWilliams, James E (2005). A Revolution in Eating: How the Quest for Food Shaped America. Art and Traditions of the Table. New York: Columbia University Press. ISBN 0-231-12992-0.
- Vester, Katharina (2015). A Taste of Power: Food and American Identities. Oakland, California: University of California Press. ISBN 978-0-520-28497-5.
- Williams, Susan (2006). Food in the United States, 1820s-1890. Westport, Connecticut: Greenwood Press. ISBN 0-313-33245-2.

=== Journals ===
- Edwards, Herbert (June 1953). "Lydia M. Child's the Frugal Housewife". The New England Quarterly. 26 (2). JSTOR 362453.
- Holland, Patricia G (1981). "Lydia Maria Child as a Nineteenth-Century Professional Author". Studies in the American Renaissance. JSTOR 30227480.
- Holland, Patricia G (Fall 1988). "Legacy Profile: Lydia Maria Child (1802-1880)". Legacy. 5 (2). JSTOR 25679032.
