= An Appeal in Favor of that Class of Americans Called Africans =

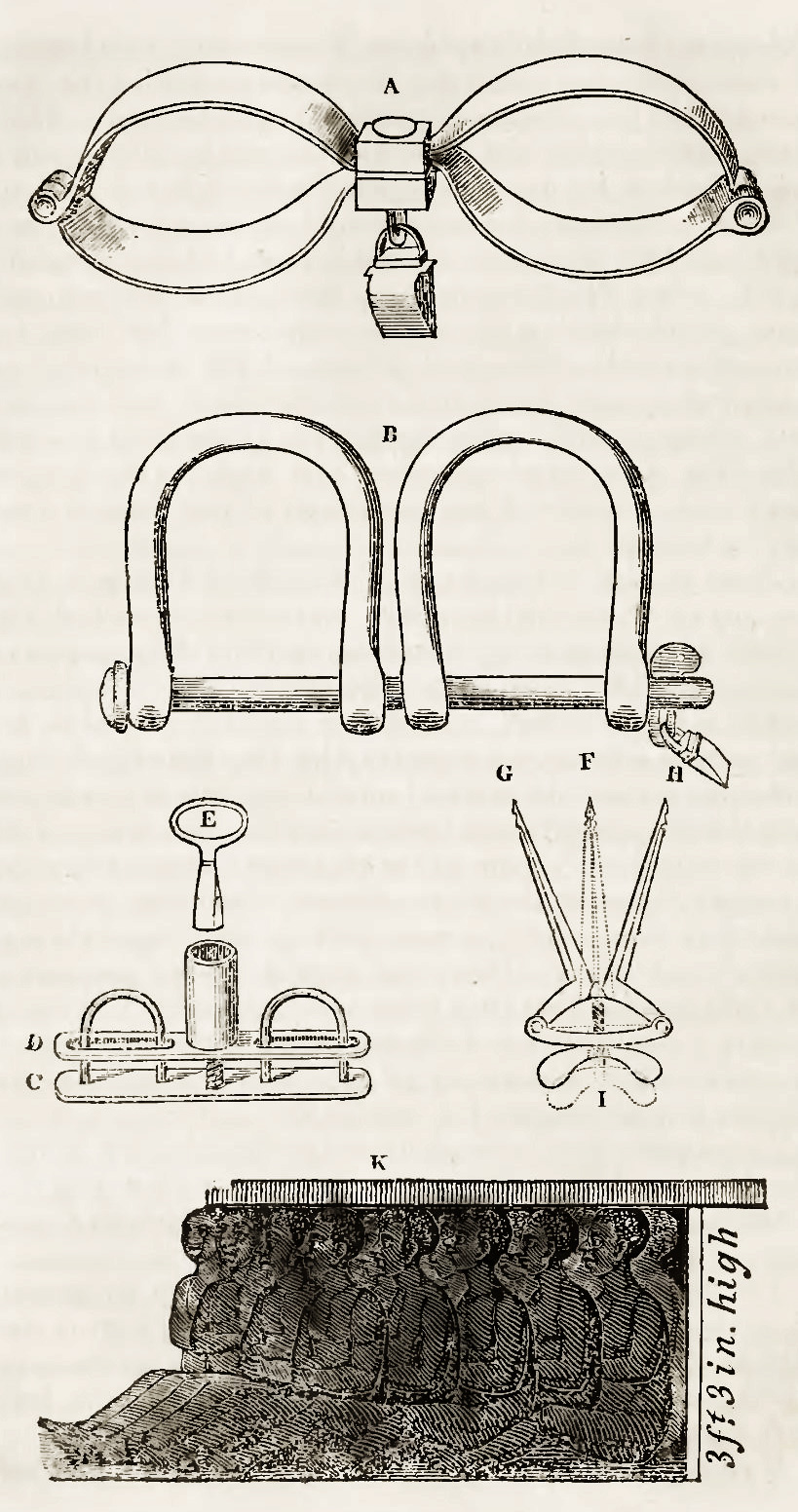
Illustration from the book, page 16

An Appeal in Favor of That Class of Americans Called Africans is an 1833 book by American writer Lydia Maria Child, which advocated the immediate emancipation of the slaves without compensation to their owners.

According to Thomas Wentworth Higginson, "it was the first anti-slavery work ever printed in America in book form". It was published by Allen & Ticknor in Boston, a predecessor to Ticknor and Fields, at the expense of the author. She spent about three years researching and writing the book and often drew from William Lloyd Garrison's antislavery newspaper The Liberator and likely David Walker's 1829 Appeal to the Coloured Citizens of the World.

Child's argument includes a distrust of the growing political power of the Southern states, which she perceived as a slavocracy. She addresses her concern in a chapter titled "Influence of Slavery on the Politics of the United States" and cites the Missouri Compromise as an example.
