= Susannah Carter =

British Author

Susannah Carter (fl. 1765?) was the author of an early household management and cookery book, The Frugal Housewife, or, Complete woman cook. Little more is known than that Carter was from Clerkenwell in London as stated in the title page of the first edition.

Her book was first published around 1765 in London by Francis Newbery, who was based in a printing enclave around St Paul's Cathedral. He was the nephew of John Newbery, after whom the Newbery Medal for children's books was named. The book was also published in 1765 in Dublin, and was first reprinted in North America in 1772 by Benjamin Edes and John Gill in Boston, illustrated with prints made by Paul Revere.

The book strongly influenced the first cookery book by an American author, Amelia Simmons's American Cookery (1796), in parts almost identical content. An appendix was added to the 1803 American edition, supplementing "receipts" [recipes] "adapted to the American mode of cooking", such as Indian puddings, buckwheat cakes, pumpkin pie, maple molasses, and maple beer. The appendix may have been translated from Arthur Young's Rural Oeconomy: an identical appendix appears in an 1805 edition of Hannah Glasse's The Art of Cookery (originally published in 1747).

Confusingly, a completely different book with the same title was written by Lydia Maria (Francis) Child; its popularity may be reason why it remained in print from 1829 to 1855. Child's The Frugal Housewife was also published in London and Glasgow from 1832 to 1834. In 1832 to avoid the confusion, Child changed her title to The American Frugal Housewife. She wrote of the usefulness of Carter's book for Americans: "It was the intention of the author of the American Frugal Housewife, to have given an Appendix from the English Frugal Housewife; but upon examination, she found the book so little fitted to the wants of this country, that she has been able to extract but little."
