= David Lee Child =

American abolitionist and writer (1794–1874)

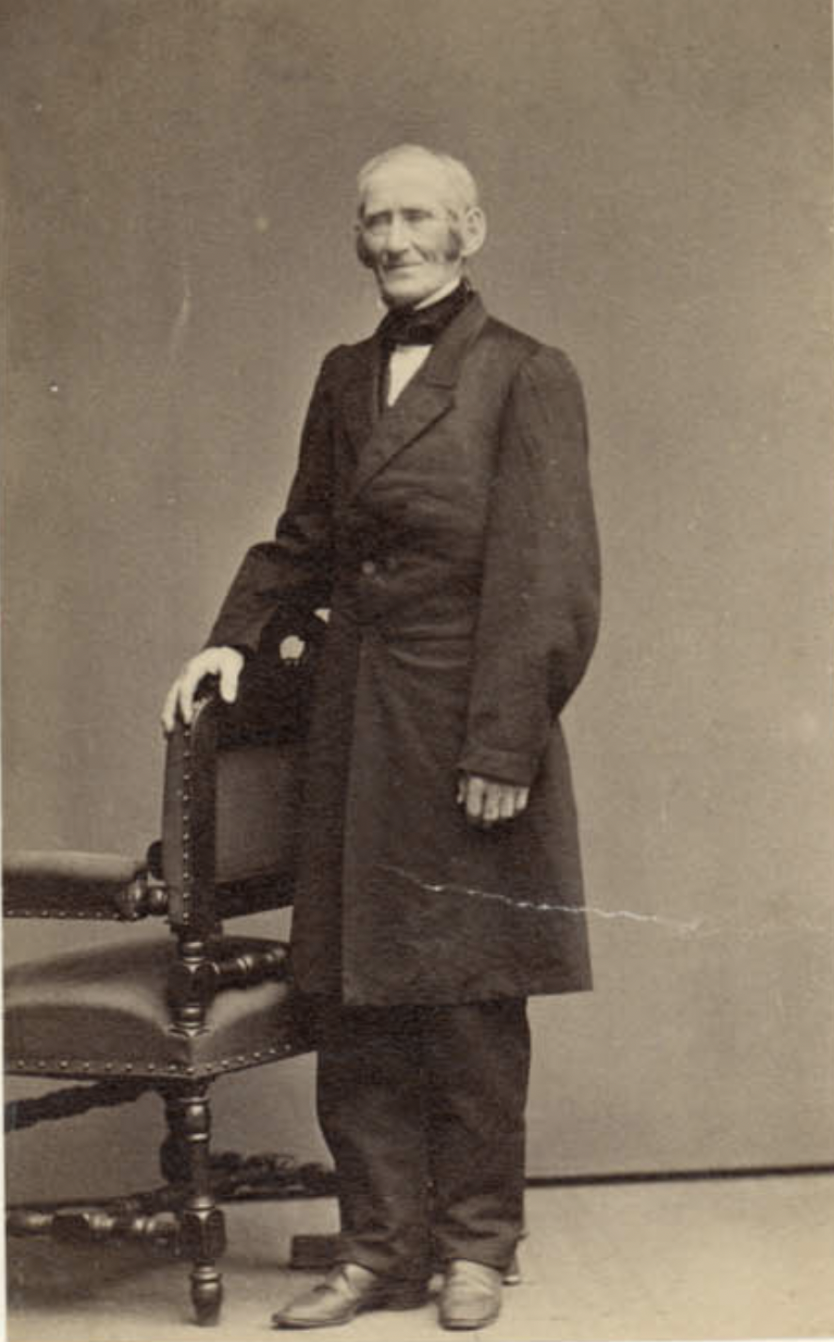
- David Lee Child in 1864
- Born: July 8, 1794; West Boylston, Massachusetts, U.S.
- Died: September 18, 1874 (aged 80); Wayland, Massachusetts, U.S.
- Education: Harvard College
- Occupations: Journalist, entrepreneur, activist
- Spouse: Lydia Maria Francis (m. 1828)

David Lee Child (July 8, 1794 – September 18, 1874) was an American journalist, entrepreneur, abolitionist, and social justice activist from Massachusetts. He was closely associated with his wife, Lydia Maria Child, a renowned author.

== Early life and education ==
Child was born in West Boylston, Massachusetts, on July 8, 1794, as one of twelve children of a poor farmer. He graduated from Harvard College in 1817.

== Career ==
Child worked for some time as the sub-master of the Boston Latin School. Fluent in French, German, Spanish, Portuguese, Latin, and Greek, he served as American secretary of legation in Lisbon about 1820. He abandoned his diplomatic career to fight in Spain during the Royalist War, "defending what he considered the cause of freedom against her French invaders." Returning to the United States in 1824, he read law in 1825 with his uncle, Tyler Bigelow, in Watertown, Massachusetts, and later gained admittance to the bar. While he struggled with debts and lacked a fixed profession or income, he was handsome, charismatic, worldly, and well-regarded. He met Lydia Maria Francis in 1824 and married her in Watertown on October 19, 1828. Throughout their lives, the Childs were active in abolitionist and other social justice causes, including opposition to Indian removal and the Mexican–American War.

Using the money his wife earned from her writing, David Lee Child pursued various unsuccessful business ventures. He borrowed $15,000, a huge sum of money at the time, to sustain the Massachusetts Journal. He lost a libel suit and spent six months in jail in 1830. In 1836, he traveled to Belgium and France to study the sugar beet industry, seeking an alternative to sugarcane grown by enslaved people in the Caribbean. On his return, he and his wife established a sugar beet farm and sugar refinery in Northampton, Massachusetts. In 1839, he received a silver medal from the Massachusetts Charitable Mechanic Association to commemorate the first manufacture of beet sugar in the United States. The enterprise failed in 1841, leaving the couple even deeper in debt. Maria moved to New York in May 1841 to edit the National Anti-Slavery Standard and severed her finances from David's in 1843.

Child wrote and spoke widely about abolitionism and other causes. He edited the Whig-aligned Massachusetts Journal about 1830. While a member of the Massachusetts General Court, he denounced the annexation of Texas, afterward publishing a pamphlet on the subject, entitled Naboth's Vineyard, in 1845. He was an early member of the New England Anti-Slavery Society and in 1832 wrote a series of letters on slavery and the slave trade to Edward Strutt Abdy, an English philanthropist. He also published ten articles on the same subject (Philadelphia, 1836). During a visit to Paris in 1837 he addressed an elaborate memoir to the Société pour l'abolition d'esclavage and sent a paper on the same subject to the editor of The Eclectic Review in London. John Quincy Adams was much indebted to Child's facts and arguments in the speeches that he delivered in congress on the Texan question.

== Later life and death ==
The Childs, who had no children, reconciled in 1850 and eventually settled on a small farm in Wayland, Massachusetts, where they lived quietly on the proceeds from Maria's writing. After years of ill health, David died at home in Wayland on September 18, 1874.

== Writings ==
- The Taking of Naboth's Vineyard OCLC 457657810
- The Texan Revolution, ISBN 9781275767973, OCLC 982179493
- Child, David Lee (1861). Rights and duties of the United States relative to slavery under the laws of war: No military power to return any slave. "Contraband of war" inapplicable between the United States and their insurgent enemies. R. F. Wallcut.
- Child, David Lee (1840). The Culture of the Beet, and Manufacture of Beet Sugar. Weeks, Jordan & Company.
- Child, David Lee (1826). An Oration Pronounced before the Republicans of Boston, July 4, 1826, the Fiftieth Anniversary of American Independence. Boston.
