= Over the River and Through the Wood =

1844 poem by Lydia Maria Child

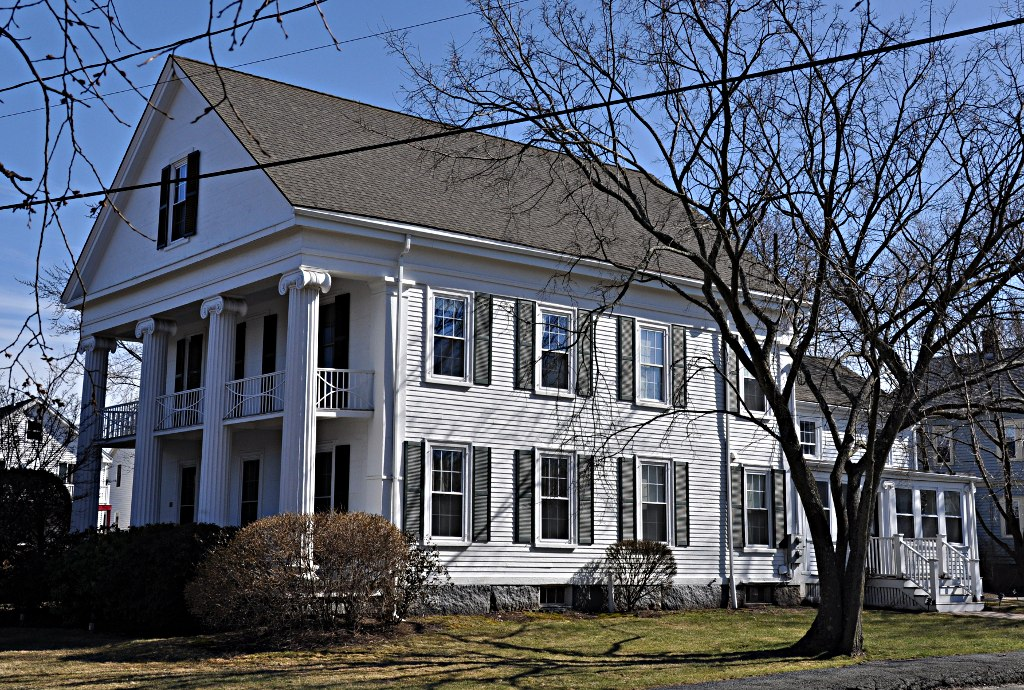
"Grandfather's House", also known as the Paul Curtis House, in Medford, MA.

Recording by Grant Raymond Barrett, 2006

"The New-England Boy's Song about Thanksgiving Day", also known as "Over the River and Through the Wood", is a Thanksgiving poem by Lydia Maria Child, originally published in 1844 in Flowers for Children, Volume 2.

Although many people sing "to grandmother's house we go", the author's original words were "to grandfather's house we go". Moreover, in modern American English, most people use the word woods rather than wood in reference to a forest, and sing the song accordingly.

== Background ==
The poem was originally published as "The New-England Boy's Song about Thanksgiving Day" in Child's Flowers for Children. It celebrates the author's childhood memories of visiting her grandfather's house (said to be the Paul Curtis House). Lydia Maria Child was a novelist, journalist, teacher, and poet who wrote extensively about the need to eliminate slavery.

The poem was eventually set to a tune by an unknown composer. The song version is sometimes presented with lines about Christmas, rather than Thanksgiving. For instance, the line "Hurrah for Thanksgiving Day!" becomes "Hurrah for Christmas Day!" As a Christmas song, it has been recorded as "A Merry Christmas at Grandmother's". Although the modern Thanksgiving holiday is not always associated with snow (snow in late November occasionally occurs in the northern states and is rare at best elsewhere in the United States), New England in the early 19th century was enduring the Little Ice Age, a colder era with earlier winters.

== Poem ==
The original piece had twelve stanzas, though only four are typically included in the song.

Over the river, and through the wood,
To Grandfather's house we go;
the horse knows the way to carry the sleigh
through the white and drifted snow.

Over the river, and through the wood,
to Grandfather's house away!
We would not stop for doll or top,
for 'tis Thanksgiving Day.

Over the river, and through the wood—
oh, how the wind does blow!
It stings the toes and bites the nose
as over the ground we go.

Over the river, and through the wood—
and straight through the barnyard gate,
We seem to go extremely slow,
it is so hard to wait!

Over the river, and through the wood—
When Grandmother saw us come,
She will say, "O, dear, the children are here,
bring a pie for everyone."

Over the river, and through the wood—
now Grandmother's cap I spy!
Hurrah for the fun! Is the pudding done?
Hurrah for the pumpkin pie!

The following verses appear in a "long version":

Over the river, and through the wood,
with a clear blue winter sky,
The dogs do bark, and children hark,
as we go jingling by.

Over the river, and through the wood,
to have a first-rate play.
Hear the bells ring, "Ting-a-ling-ding!",
Hurrah for Thanksgiving Day!

Over the river, and through the wood,
no matter for winds that blow;
Or if we get the sleigh upset
into a bank of snow

Over the river, and through the wood,
to see little John and Ann;
We will kiss them all, and play snow-ball
and stay as long as we can.

Over the river, and through the wood,
trot fast, my dapple-gray!
Spring over the ground like a hunting-hound!
For 'tis Thanksgiving Day.

Over the river, and through the wood,
Old Jowler hears our bells.
He shakes his pow, with a loud bow-wow,
and thus the news he tells.

== Legacy ==
Fred Waring recorded a greatly expanded suite bookended by the song, Grandma's Thanksgiving, in 1947. The additional material was composed by Harry Simeone with lyrics by Frank Cunkle and recorded for Decca Records' children's line. Grandma's Thanksgiving became a radio tradition on WBEN in Buffalo, New York under host Clint Buehlman.

Near the end of the 1973 TV special A Charlie Brown Thanksgiving, as the characters ride in the back of Charlie's parents' station wagon to his grandmother's house, they sing "Over the River and Through the Woods". As they finish the song, Charlie Brown says, "There's one problem with that. My grandmother lives in a condominium."

In the South Park episode, Merry Christmas, Charlie Manson! Eric Cartman, and Liane Cartman both sing the song in their station wagon while driving to his grandmother's house, while his friends Stan, Kyle, and Kenny listen in annoyance in the back.

A children's book, Over the River—A Turkey's Tale, recasts the poem as a humorous tale of a family of turkeys on their way to a vegetarian Thanksgiving; the book was written by Derek Anderson, and published by Simon & Schuster in 2005.

It is also the title of a young adult historical fiction novel about a teenage pioneer crossing the wilderness with her young siblings in tow. The book, which features young adult heroine Caroline Darley, was written by author Brynna Williamson and was published by Stones in Clay Publishing in 2020.
