= Grandfather's House =

Historic house in Massachusetts, United States

- Paul Curtis House
- U.S. National Register of Historic Places
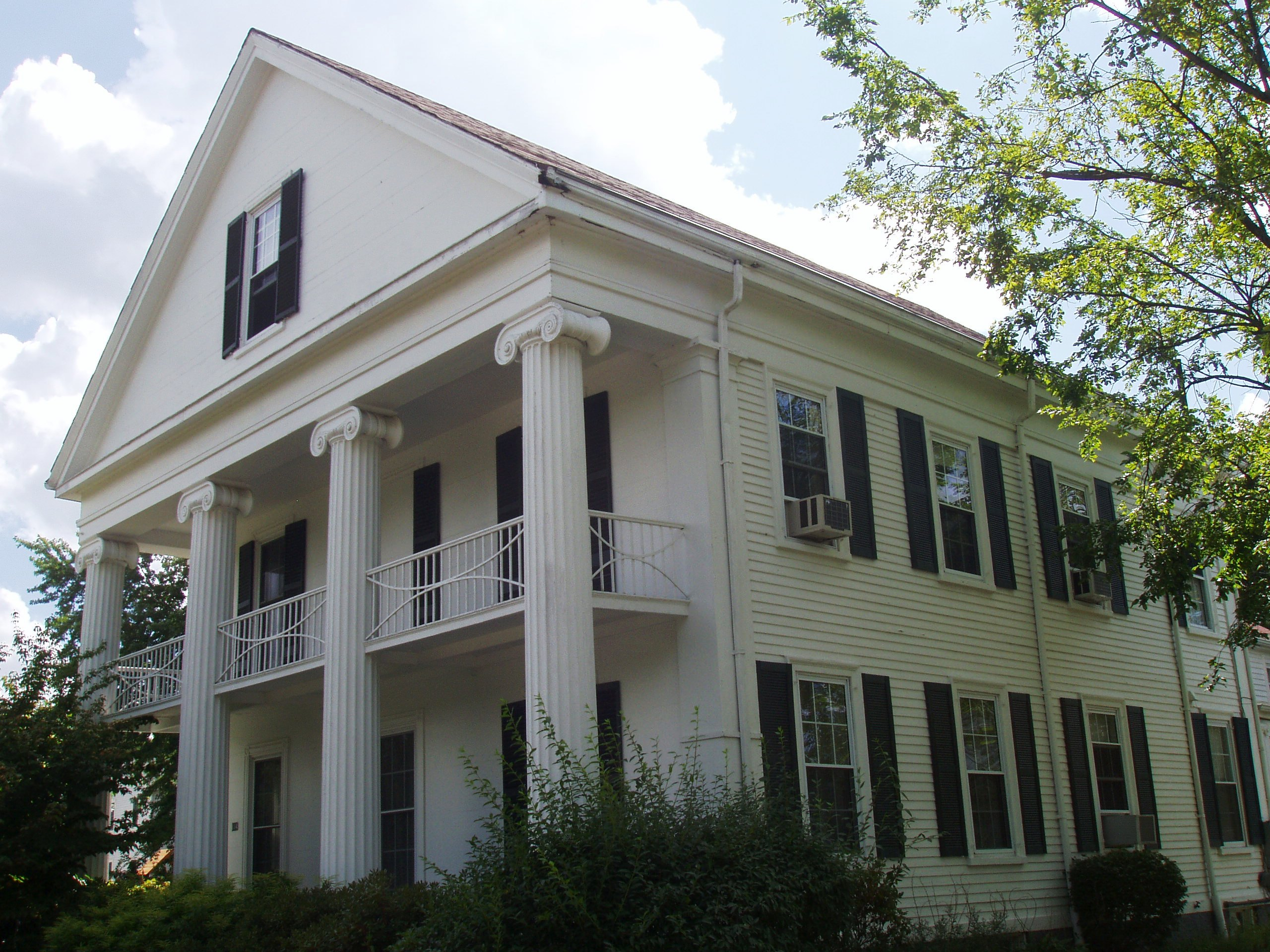

- Location within Massachusetts Location within the United States
- Location: 114 South Street, Medford, Massachusetts, U.S.
- Coordinates: 42°25′2.6″N 71°7′0.6″W
- Built: 1839
- Architectural style: Greek Revival
- NRHP reference No.: 75000272
- Added to NRHP: May 6, 1975

Grandfather's House, also known as the Paul Curtis House, is a historic house in Medford, Massachusetts. It is claimed to be the original house named in the American poem "Over the River and through the Wood" by Lydia Maria Child. (Although many people sing "to grandmother's house we go", the author's original words were "to grandfather's house we go".)

The house, which was listed on the National Register of Historic Places in 1975, is also noteworthy for being the best-preserved example of Greek Revival architecture in Medford, and for its association with Paul Curtis, a prominent local shipbuilder.

== History ==
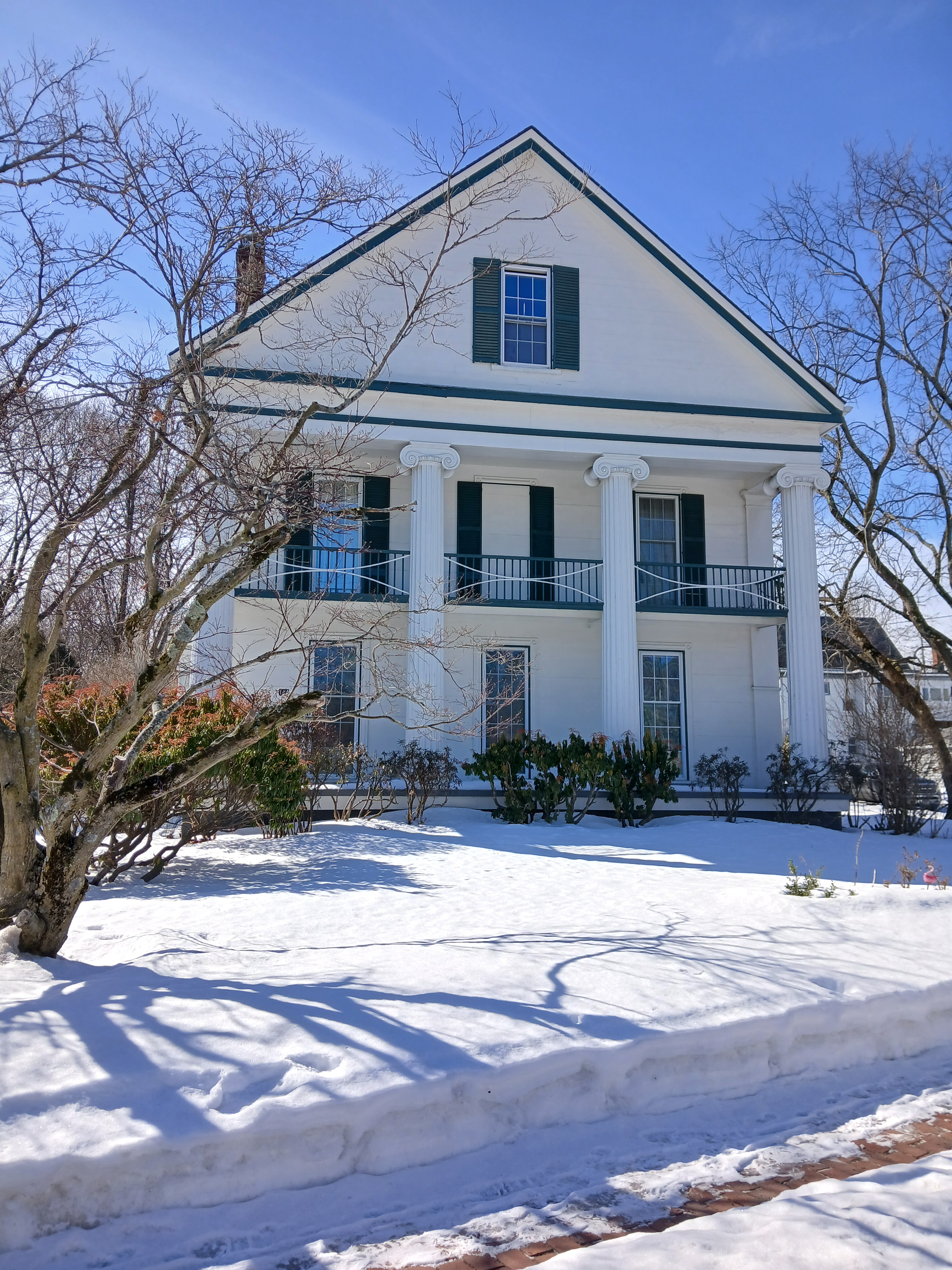
Grandfather's House of the Lydia Maria Child poem, seen in winter 2026

"Over the River and Through the Wood" (1844) as performed by Grant Raymond Barrett, 2006

The rear portion of the modern house was built as a small farmhouse in the early 19th century. Child recalled the farmhouse when she wrote of her childhood visits to her grandfather's house in her poem, published in 1844. The house is located near the Mystic River, which is believed to be the river referred to in the poem. The referenced woods have long since been replaced by residential housing.

About 1839, Curtis greatly enlarged the house and gave it its two-story Ionic portico. In 1975, the house was added to the National Register of Historic Places. In 1976, Tufts University purchased and restored the house. In 2013 the house was sold to a developer who divided the lot the house sits on in order to build a duplex next door. In 2014 the house was again sold without its former yard to a private individual.

In the 19th century, ships were built across the street. A painting hung in the house shows a ship being built, with the house across the river, and Ballou Hall (the original Tufts building) on top of the hill in the distance, with no other development in between.

== See also ==
- National Register of Historic Places listings in Medford, Massachusetts
- National Register of Historic Places listings in Middlesex County, Massachusetts
