= Edward Strutt Abdy =

English legal academic and abolitionist (1791–1846)

Edward Strutt Abdy (1791–1846) was an English legal academic and abolitionist, notable as an author on racism and race relations in the United States.

== Early life ==
Abdy was the fifth and youngest son of Thomas Abdy Abdy, of Albyns, Essex, by Mary, daughter of James Hayes, of Holliport, a bencher of the Middle Temple.

He was educated at Felsted School and Jesus College, Cambridge, where he obtained a fellowship (B.A. 1813; M.A. 1817). He was admitted to the Middle Temple in 1813.

== Tour in the USA, 1833–4 ==
Abdy made an extended American tour, beginning with a visit to Auburn Prison in New York State, by way of a pretext. He visited also southern and western states. The leader of the prison reform group with which Abdy set off was William Crawford (1788–1847), sent by the British Home Secretary Viscount Melbourne to investigate the "silent system" of Auburn Prison, and the "separate system" in operation at Pennsylvania. The tour resulted in the publication by Abdy of a three-volume Journal of a Residence and Tour in the United States of North America, from April 1833 to October 1834. It reported on his research on US penal institutions, made with members of the Society for the Improvement of Prison Discipline and the Reformation of Juvenile Offenders. But Abdy wrote also at length on the racism he perceived in American society.

On his journeys, Abdy had close contact with US abolitionists including Maria Weston Chapman. He influenced William Ellery Channing and Lydia Maria Child; and was involved in the formation of the (American) Anti-Slavery League.

Abdy paid a visit in New York to Peter Williams, Jr., the black Episcopal minister. In his Journal of a Residence and Tour Abdy recounts, under a chapter subheading "Africo-American craniology", a conversation he had on skulls, with the sexton of Williams's church, who worked in what had become the burial ground for all black New Yorkers. The sexton, on Abdy's account, told an anecdote against "Dr. Paschalis" (i.e. Félix Pascalis-Ouvière M.D. (1762–1833), French physician in New York), based on the proposition that Paschalis could not with certainty identify an African-American skull from the bone alone. Abdy's intention in the framing of this account has been regarded as problematic.

On the other hand, Channing had an interest in phrenology, and a copy of George Combe's Constitution of Man (Boston, 1829). In the widely-reported conversation Abdy had had with Channing, he had pushed Channing on whether he was properly informed on the free black population. Channing on this occasion produced a phrenological argument for white supremacy. This encounter, in August 1834 in Rhode Island, saw Abdy throw back some of Channing's own words at him. Channing later told Harriet Martineau that Abdy's reasoning had an impact on his views. The public perception, based on Abdy's book and his comfort with being thought tactless, was that they had parted on bad terms.

== Later life ==
In later life Abdy took an interest in hydrotherapy, publishing The Water Cure. Cases of Disease cured by Cold Water (translated from the German), with remarks addressed to people of common sense, a translation of a pamphlet by Rudolf von Falkenstein. His death occurred at Bath, 12 October 1846, at the age of 56. He was unmarried.
