= Blue Hills Reservation Parkways =

Parkways in Greater Boston, Massachusetts

- Blue Hills Reservation Parkways-Metropolitan Park System of Greater Boston
- U.S. National Register of Historic Places
- U.S. Historic district
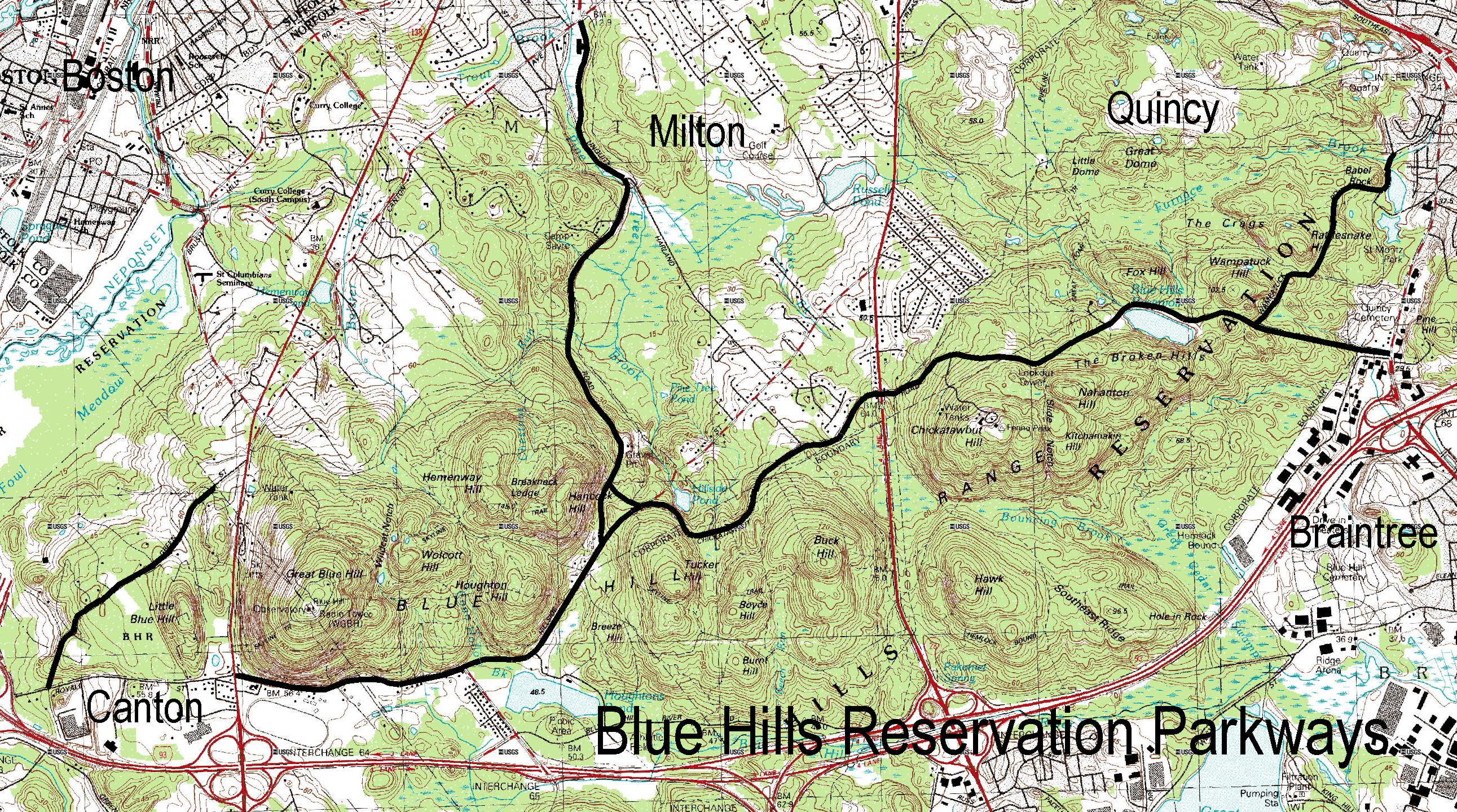

- Location within Massachusetts Location within the United States
- Location: Quincy, Milton, Canton, and Braintree in Massachusetts
- Coordinates: 42°13′25″N 71°4′20″W
- Area: 45 acres (18 ha)
- Built: 1894
- Architect: Charles Eliot
- MPS: Metropolitan Park System of Greater Boston MPS
- NRHP reference No.: 03000746
- Added to NRHP: August 11, 2003

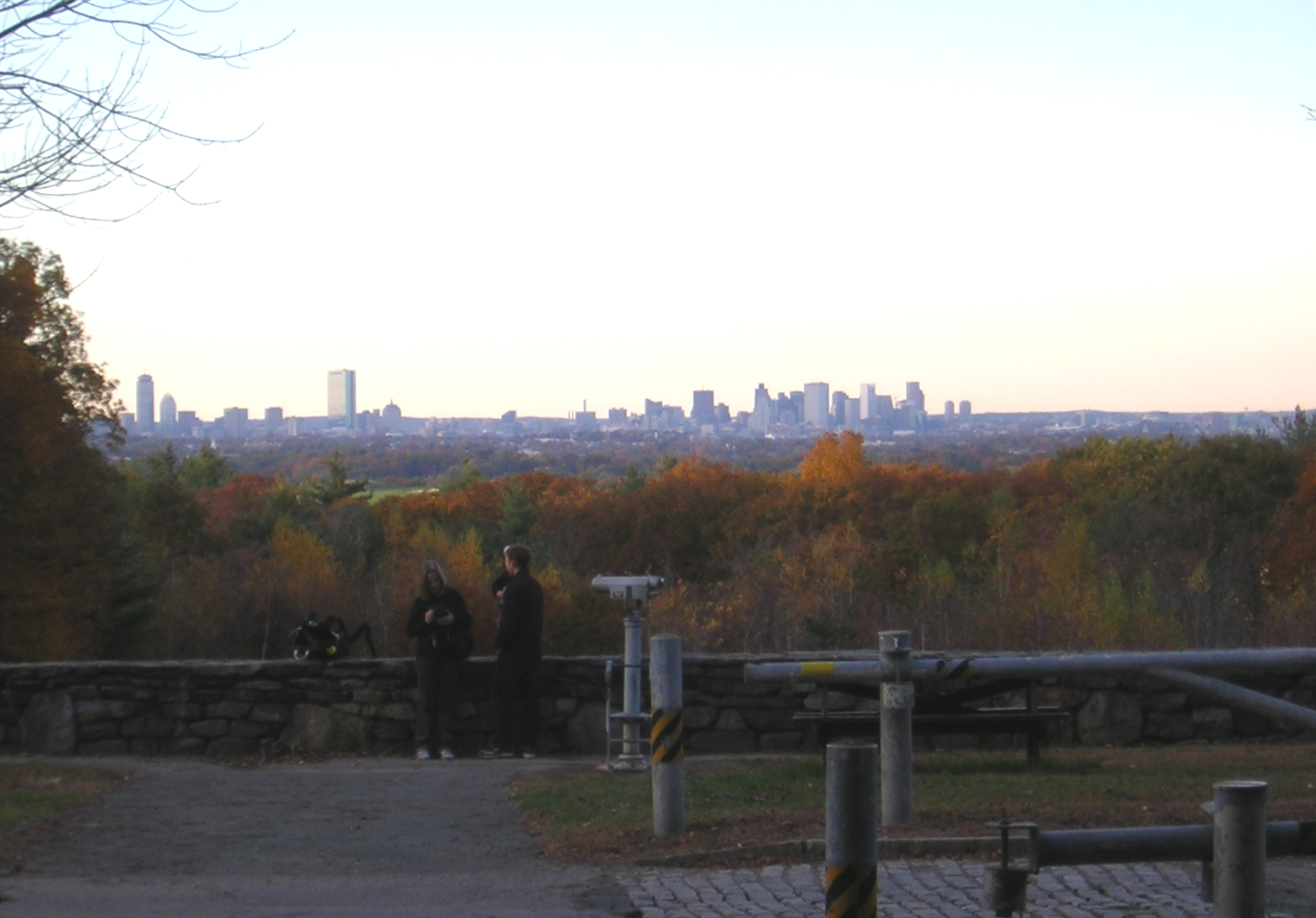
View of Boston skyline from Chickatawbut Road, Quincy

The Blue Hills Reservation Parkways are a network of historic parkways in and around the Blue Hills Reservation, a Massachusetts state park south of Boston, Massachusetts. It consists of six roadways (in seven distinct segments) that provide circulation within the park, and that join the park to two connecting parkways, the Blue Hills Parkway and the Furnace Brook Parkway. The roadway network was designed by Charles Eliot in the 1890s, except for Green Street, which was added to the network in the 1940s. The parkways were added to the National Register of Historic Places in 2003.

== Blue Hill River Road, Segment One, and Hillside Street ==
The first segment of Blue Hill River Road begins at a four-way junction with Washington Street (Massachusetts Route 138) and Royall Street (its western continuation) in Canton. It is about 1/2 mile in length, becoming Hillside Street at the Milton line. Its north side is dense forest with stone outcrops, and rising elevation into the hills. On the south side are a concrete sidewalk and a stone wall. The section of road provides access to Brookwood Farm, like the reservation administered by the Massachusetts Department of Conservation and Recreation (DCR).

Hillside Street is the major east-west roadway through the western portion of the park, and is where most of its administrative functions are located. It winds for 1.65 miles (2.66 km) through the heart of the park, passing the park police headquarters among other facilities. Its first major junction is with the second segment of Blue Hill River Road, which exits to the south, just west of Houghton's Pond. After passing the headquarters area, it has junctions with Unquity Road and Chickatawbut Roads before crossing Pine Tree Brook near the reservation's northern border. The parkway ends there, but the roadway continues as a Milton municipal roadway, traveling roughly northeast in a straight line until it meets Randolph Avenue (Massachusetts Route 28).

== Blue Hill River Road, Segment Two ==
This segment of road consists of two sections, which are roughly at right angles to each other but were historically a single roadway. From its northern junction with Hillside Street, Blue Hill River Road runs south, bordering the reservation to the east and private lands on the west. It soon reaches a three-way junction, where Ponkapoag Trail continues south to an interchange with Interstate 93, and Blue Hill River Road continues east, into the reservation. It ends at a small circular turnaround at the southeastern corner of Houghton's Pond. A nearby parking area provides access to a picnic area and recreational fields. The total length of this segment is 0.87 miles (1.40 km).

== Chickatawbut Road ==
Chickatawbut Road is the longest road in the reservation, running for nearly 3.75 miles (6.04 km) through Milton, Quincy, and Braintree. It winds through the hills, generally providing only views of dense woods, from its western terminus at Unquity Road and Hillside Street to its eastern end at Granite Street (Massachusetts Route 37) in Braintree. It provides access, however, to the Chickatawbut Observation Tower, which affords some of the best views in the reservation.

== Green Street ==
Green Street is a road discontinuous from the others, on the western side of the reservation in Milton and Canton. It runs from Royall Street in Canton northeast to a junction with Washington Street in Milton, skirting the westernmost edge of the reservation. This section of the reservation was acquired in the 1940s; the road was originally a municipal street.

== Unquity Road ==
Unquity Road extends north from its junction with Hillside Street and Chickatawbut Road in the north-central section of the park, running in a curvilinear manner very roughly parallel to Pine Tree Brook, for 2.28 miles (3.67 km) until it ends at a fourway junction with Canton Street (east-west) and the Blue Hills Parkway (north). It was originally planned as a southern continuation of the Blue Hills Parkway.

== Wampatuck Road ==
Wampatuck Road runs for about 1 mile (1.6 km) through the far easternmost portion of the park in Quincy. Its western terminus is with Chickawbut Road at a point where the latter turns more southeast, and its eastern terminus is with the Furnace Brook Parkway at a large rotary that spans (and provides ramps on and off from) Interstate 93. The road provides access to the Granite Railway, another DCR property.

== See also ==
- National Register of Historic Places listings in Milton, Massachusetts
- National Register of Historic Places listings in Quincy, Massachusetts
- National Register of Historic Places listings in Norfolk County, Massachusetts
