= Blue Hills Parkway =

Parkway in Greater Boston, Massachusetts

- U.S. National Register of Historic Places
- U.S. Historic district
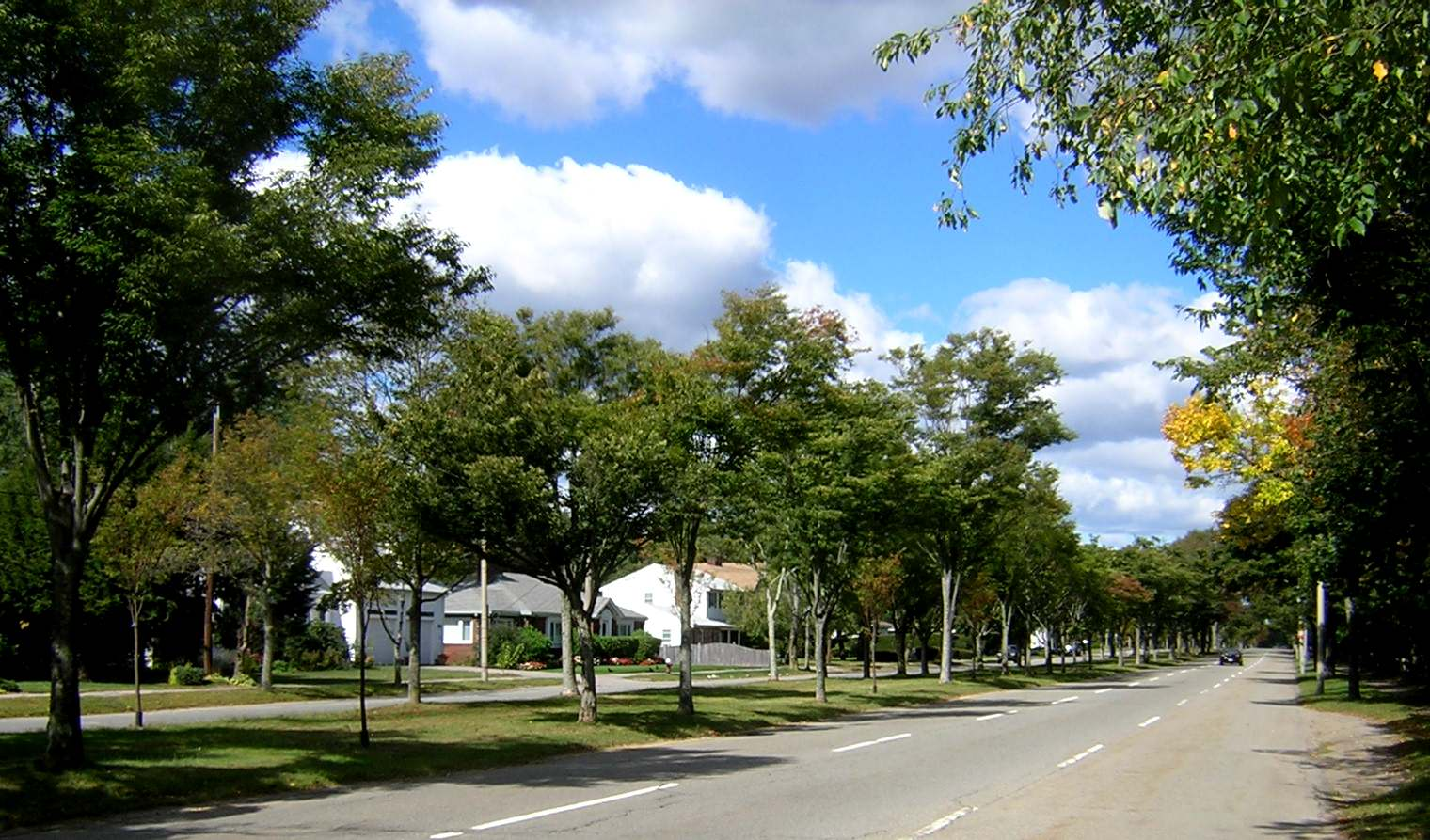

- Location within Massachusetts Location within the United States
- Location: Milton and Boston, Massachusetts
- Coordinates: 42°15′21″N 71°5′38″W
- Area: 12 acres (4.9 ha)
- Built: 1893
- Architect: Charles Eliot
- MPS: Metropolitan Park System of Greater Boston MPS
- NRHP reference No.: 03000574
- Added to NRHP: June 23, 2003

Blue Hills Parkway is a historic parkway that runs in a straight line from a crossing of the Neponset River, at the south border of Boston to the north edge of the Blue Hills Reservation in Milton, Massachusetts. It was built in 1893 to a design by the noted landscape architect, Charles Eliot, who is perhaps best known for the esplanades along the Charles River. The parkway is a connecting road between the Blue Hills Reservation and the Neponset River Reservation, and was listed on the National Register of Historic Places in 2003.

The parkway's northern terminus is a six-way intersection in southern Mattapan, a neighborhood in the far south of Boston. The junction includes River Street (which passes through the intersection), Cummins Highway, Blue Hill Avenue, and the access road for the Mattapan MBTA station. Both Blue Hill Avenue and the parkway are designated Massachusetts Route 28 at this intersection. The parkway almost immediately crosses the Neponset River and then into Milton. Brush Hill Road branches west, and Blue Hill Avenue branches to the southwest (designated Massachusetts Route 138), and a short distance later Brook Road carries the Route 28 designation off to the east. It passes through a residential area, crosses Pine Tree Brook, and soon reaches its southern terminus, a rotary intersection (this is not a rotary any longer, it is a regular 4-way intersection with overhead stoplights as of at least 2015) with Canton Street and Unquity Road (the latter being listed as part of the Blue Hills Reservation Parkways). The parkway is about 1.5 miles (2.4 km) long.

The parkway was laid out in 1894, and was one of the first connecting parkways designed by Eliot and the Olmsted Brothers. Land acquisition began in 1896, and construction took place in 1898. The Neponset River bridge was built 1901-03 Its major features include the Neponset River bridge, a granite-faced triple arch structure carrying six lanes of traffic. The complex of junctions on the south side is landscaped with a series of median islands and miters. The roadway is eight lanes in this area, allowing for turning lanes, and there is a c. 1823 granite mile marker in the grassy area on the west side of the roadway. South of the Truman Parkway interchange the road becomes six lanes, which reduce to five (two south and three north) after the Brook Road junction. The roadway for the southern stretch is canopied by trees that line the center median strip and the sides.

== See also ==
- National Register of Historic Places listings in Milton, Massachusetts
- National Register of Historic Places listings in southern Boston, Massachusetts
