= Ponkapoag Pond =

Pond in Massachusetts, United States

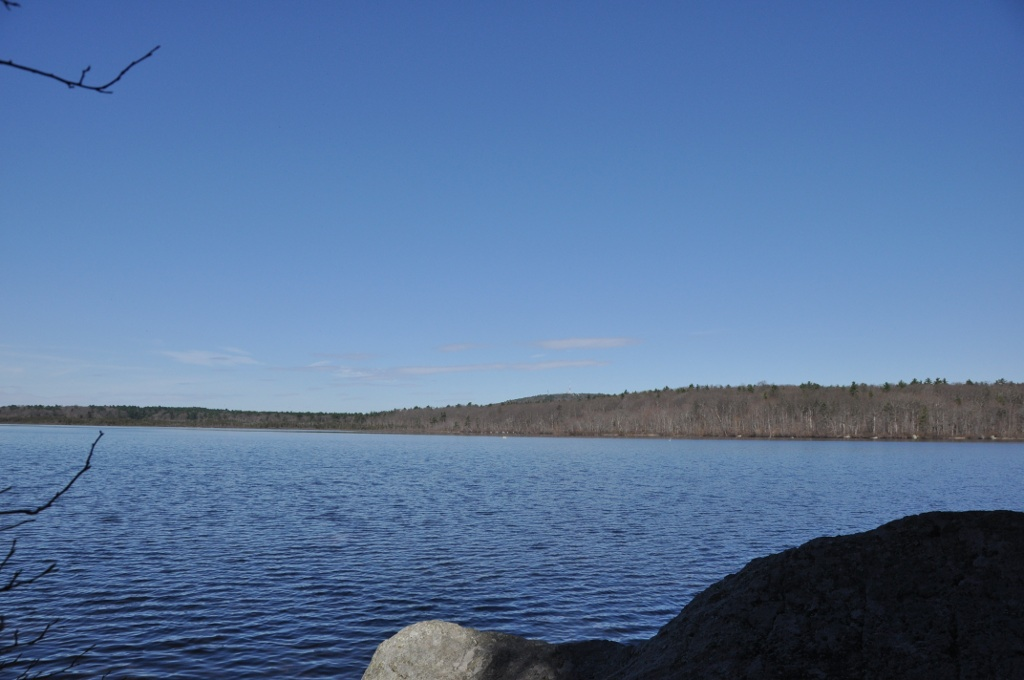
- Pond with Great Blue Hill in the distance

- Location within Massachusetts
- Location: Canton, Massachusetts
- Coordinates: 42°11′33″N 71°05′42″W
- Type: Pond
- Basin countries: United States
- Managing agency: Department of Conservation and Recreation
- Surface area: 203 acres (82 ha)
- Max. depth: 7 feet (2.1 m)
- Surface elevation: 151 ft (46 m)

Ponkapoag Pond is a 203-acre impoundment in the Blue Hills Reservation. The pond is located on the border of Canton and Randolph, Massachusetts about a half mile south of Route 128 and a half mile east of Route 138. It has a maximum depth of seven feet and an average depth of four feet. As would be expected on a pond this shallow, aquatic vegetation is pervasive and very abundant. Only a small portion of the eastern shoreline is developed; the southeastern and western shores are bordered by large expanses of marshland. A walking trail circles the pond, with parking at three locations.

The name comes from a Native American word meaning a spring that bubbles up from red soil, sweet water, or shallow pond.

== Camping ==
The Appalachian Mountain Club operates the AMC Ponkapoag Camp on the eastern shore of the pond. The camp has 20 cabins and two tent sites, available for rental year-round.

== Fishing ==
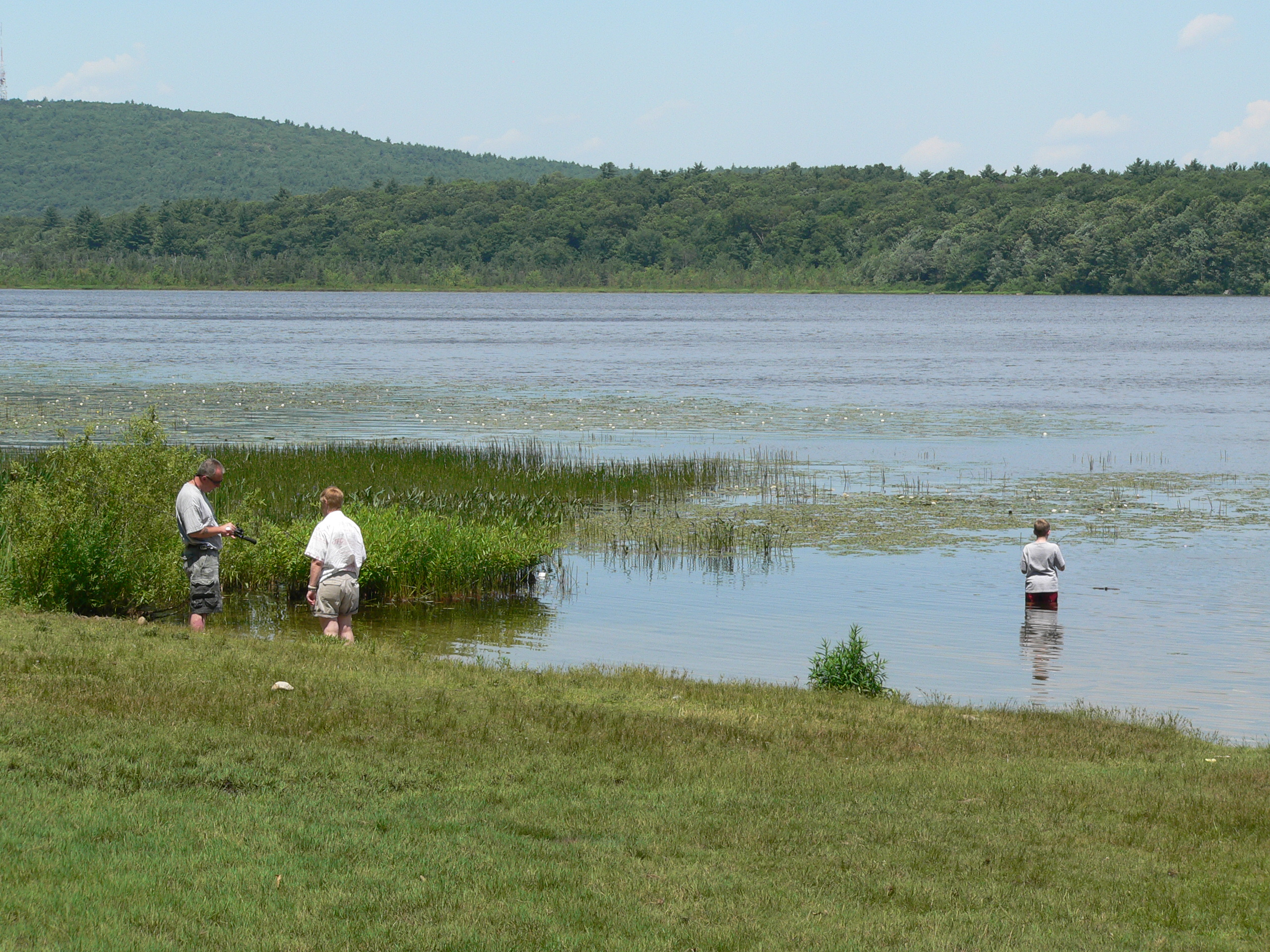

There is street-side parking and a place to launch cartop boats and canoes at Fisherman's Beach on the pond's southern side.

Although there are some limited areas where shore fishing is possible, the heavy weeds make it difficult to cover much productive water without a boat. There are abundant bass, panfish and pickerel, though trophy fish are decidedly rare.

== Image gallery ==
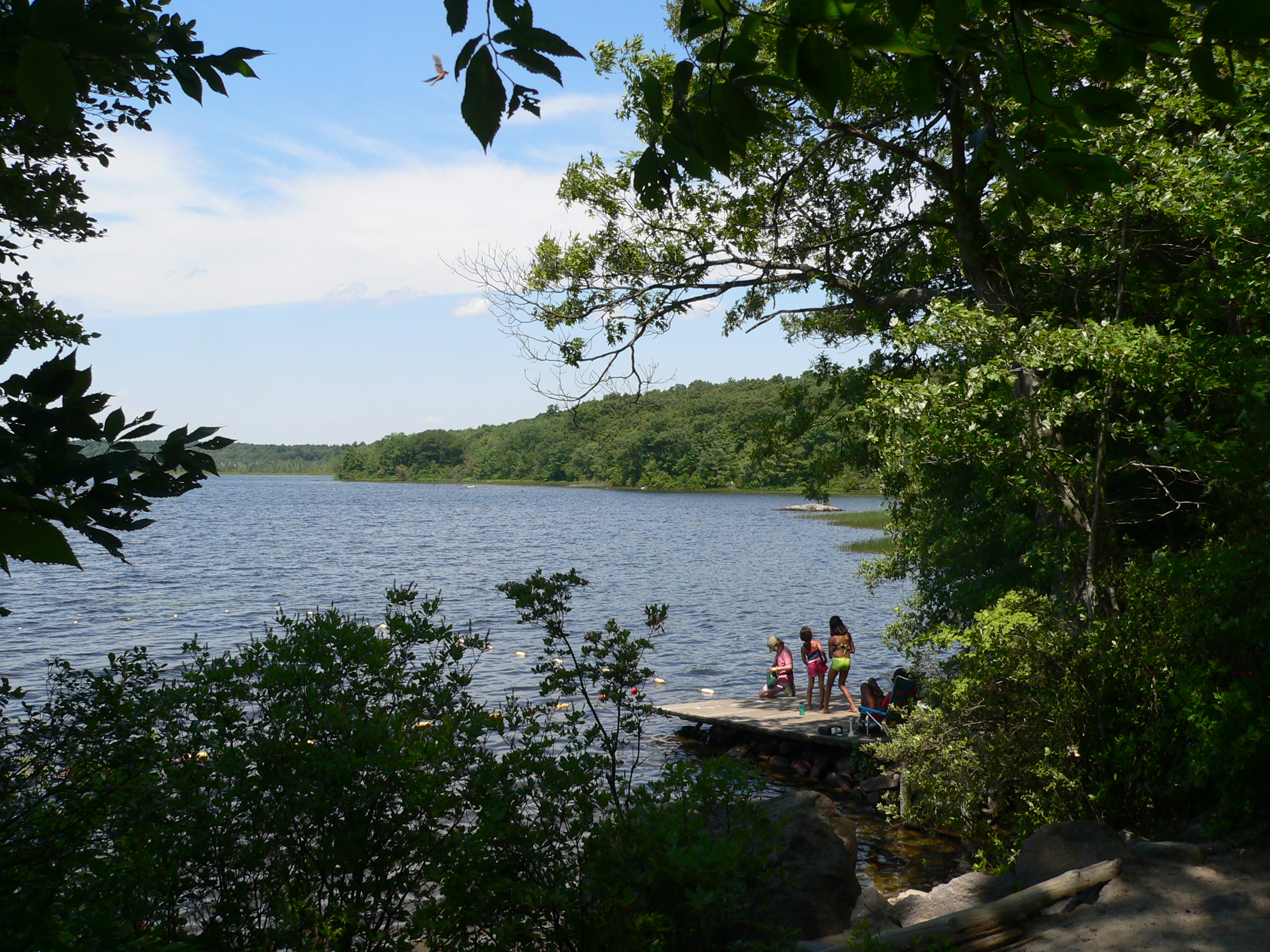

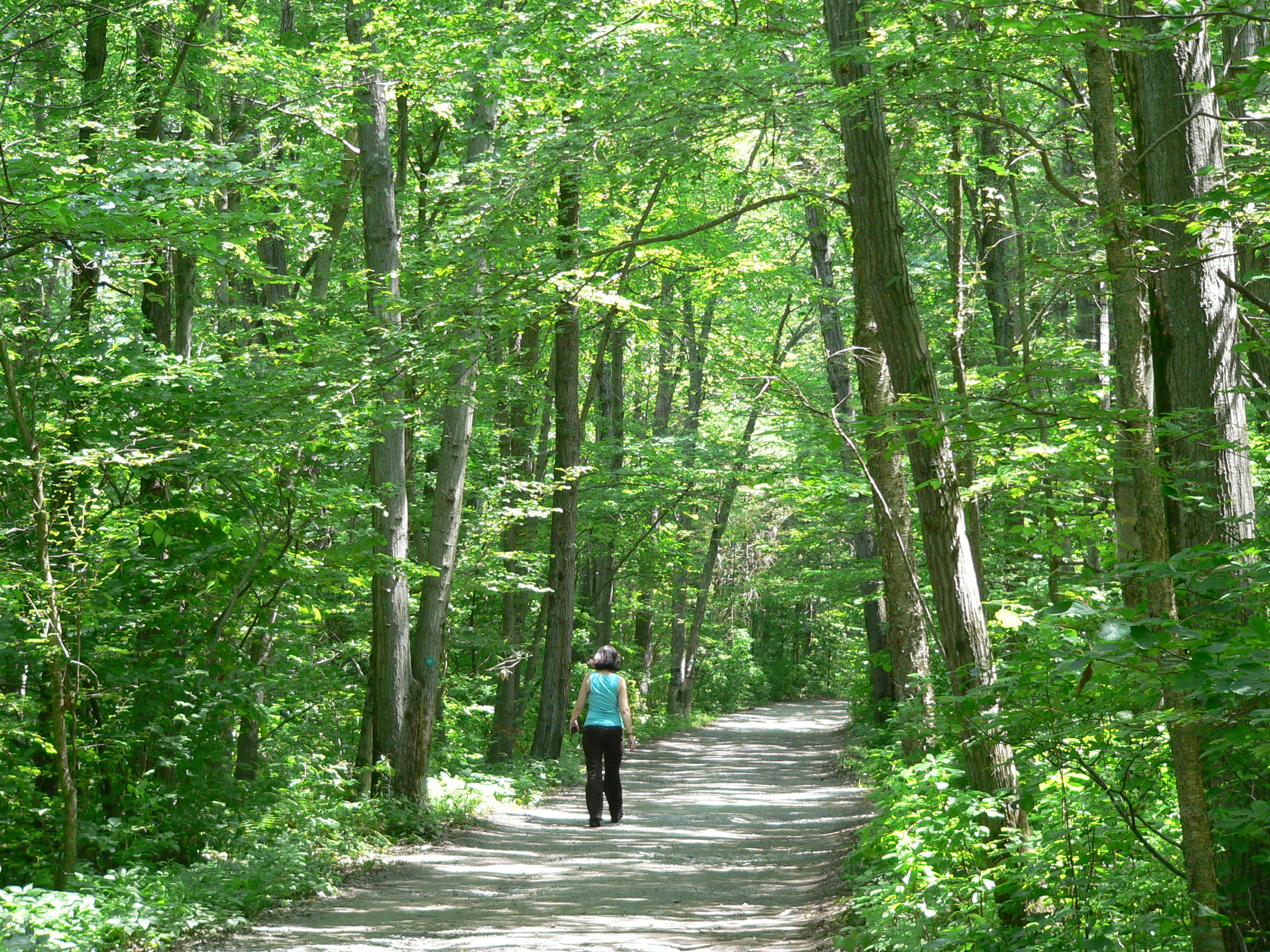

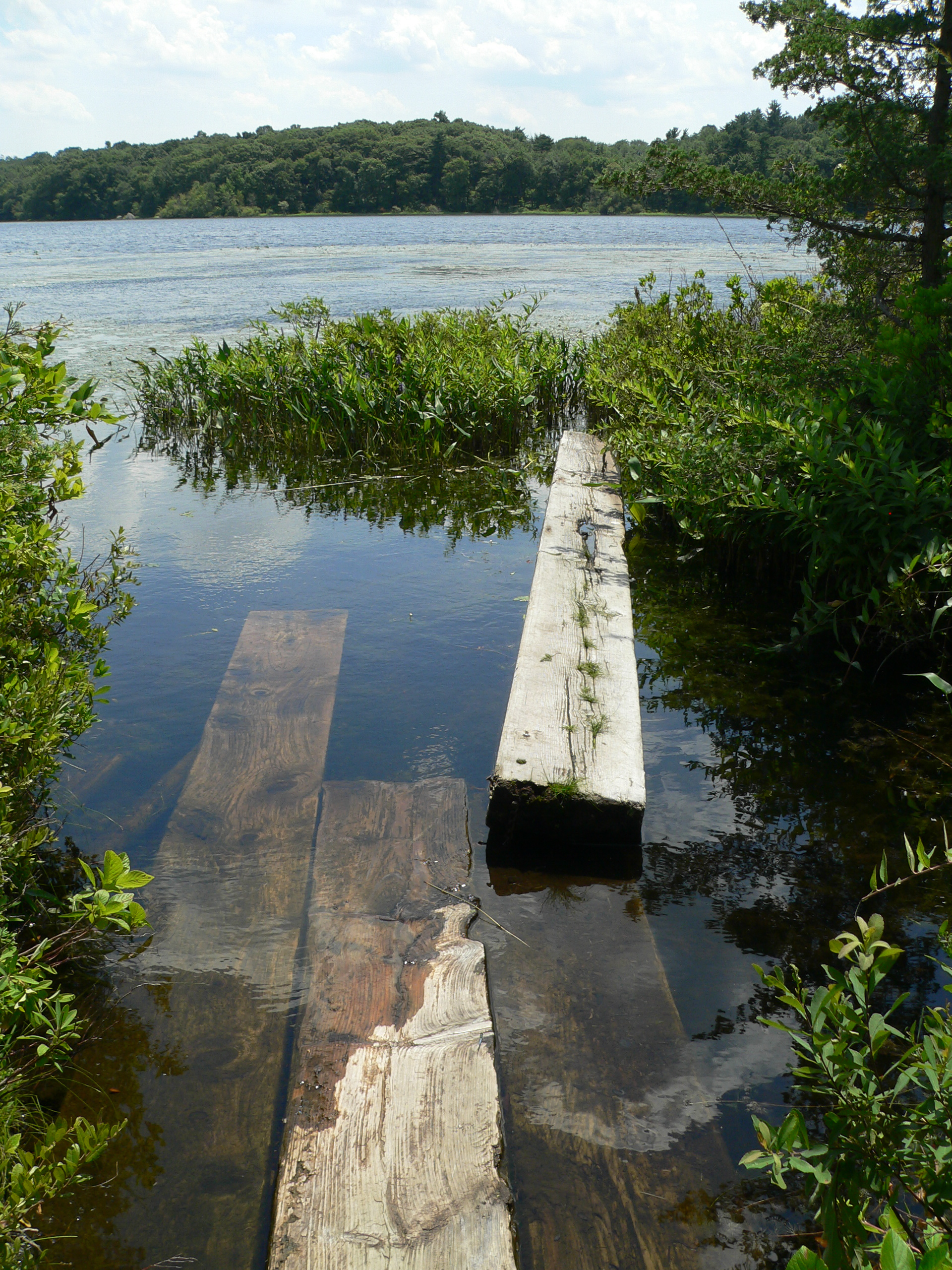

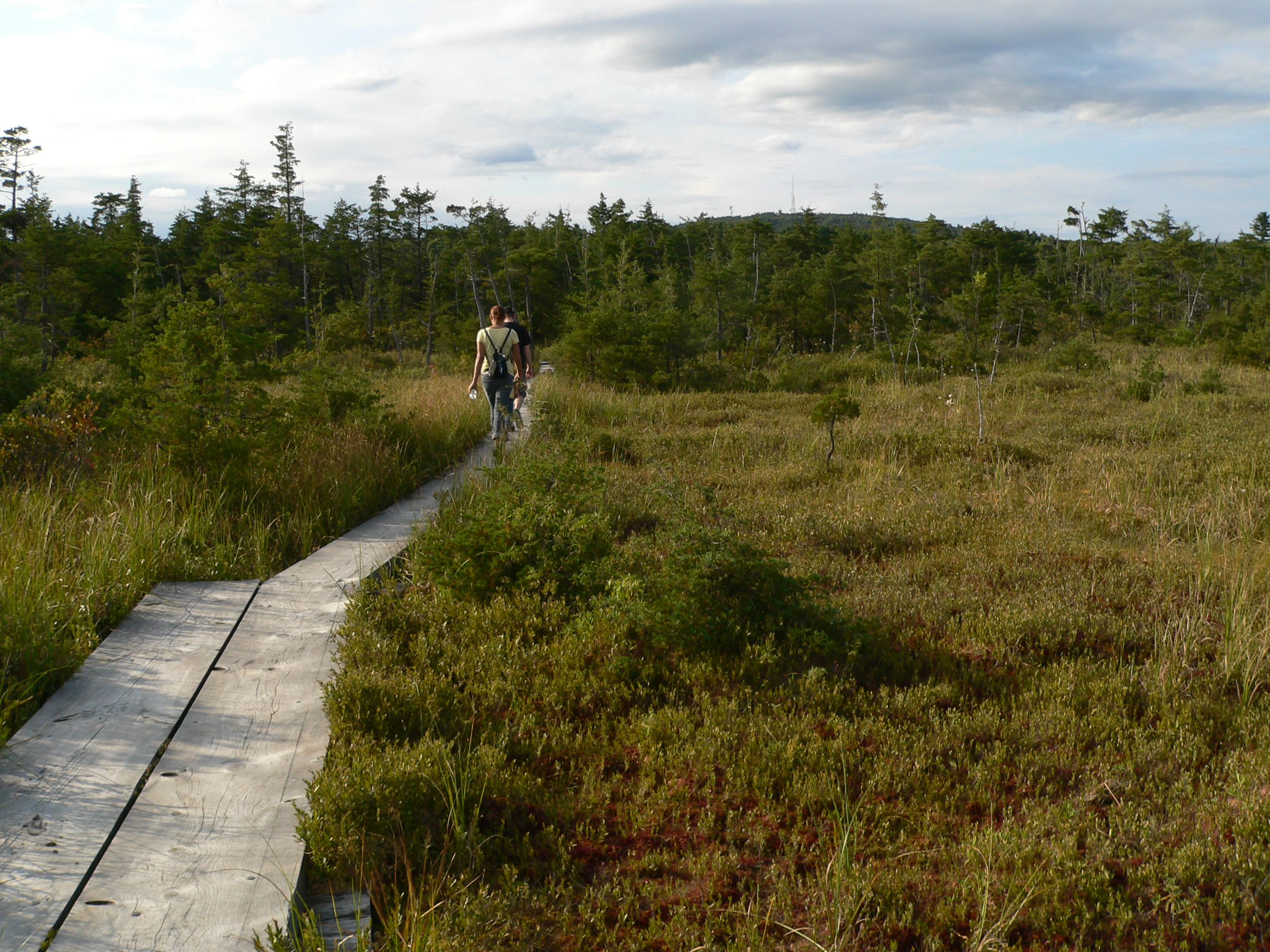
