= Refreshment Pavilion =

Historic building in Milton, Massachusetts

- Refreshment Pavillion
- U.S. National Register of Historic Places
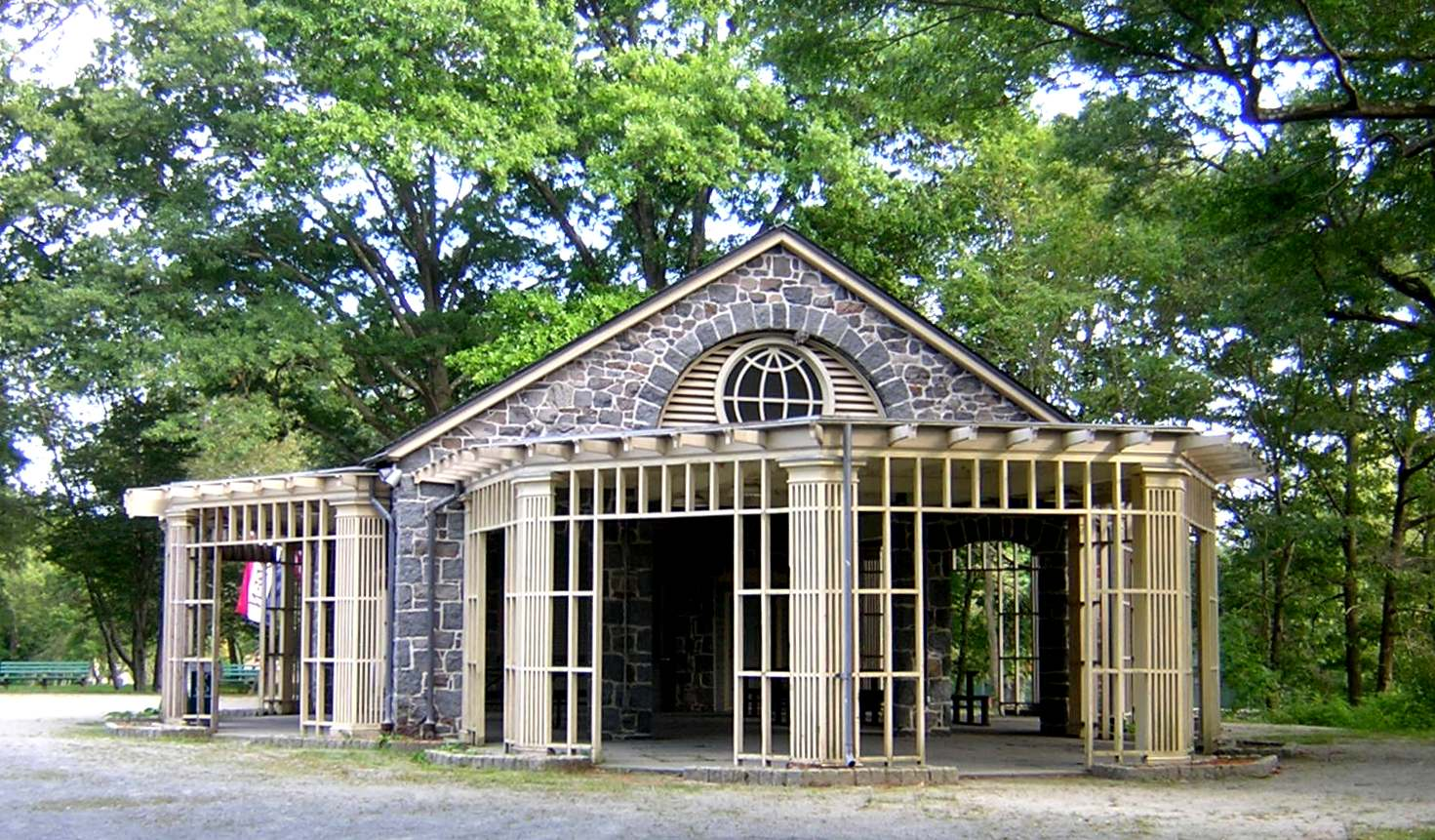
- View from the west

- Location within Massachusetts Location within the United States
- Location: Hillside St., Milton, Massachusetts
- Coordinates: 42°12′31.5″N 71°5′50.5″W
- Area: 0.9 acres (0.36 ha)
- Built: 1920
- Architect: Stickney & Austin
- Architectural style: Neo-Classical
- MPS: Blue Hills and Neponset River Reservations MRA
- NRHP reference No.: 80000659
- Added to NRHP: September 25, 1980

The Refreshment Pavilion is a historic refreshment stand at Houghton's Pond in the Milton portion of Blue Hills Reservation, a Massachusetts state park. Built in 1920, it is one of a series of architect-designed structures built in the park by the Metropolitan District Commission. It was listed on the National Register of Historic Places in 1980.

== Description and history ==
The Refreshment Pavilion is located near the northern shore of Houghton's Pond, a body of water in the southwestern part of the Blue Hills Reservation. It is set south of Hillside Street, the access road for the pond's beach area, which is located east of the pavilion. It is a single-story rectangular stone structure with a gable roof. Oculus windows are set in the gables, surrounded by louvered openings, and there are covered pergola-like porches extending from some of its sides supported by slatted supporting columns.

The Blue Hills are a range of hills located about 10 miles (16 km) south of downtown Boston. For many years they were largely undeveloped, and became a popular recreational destination by the late 19th century. The Metropolitan Parks Commission, created by the state to establish a network of parks and roadways around the Greater Boston area (and a predecessor to the MDC and today's Massachusetts Department of Conservation and Recreation, or DCR), formally acquired the reservation land in the early 1890s, but did no active development of amenities and infrastructure. By 1899, the need for roadways and other features was apparent, and the MDC hired the Boston firm Stickney & Austin to design structures for the reservation. Between 1899 and 1926 Stickney and Austin designed a number of structures, seven of which survive today. The Refreshment Pavilion at Houghton's Pond is one of these, exhibiting the use of high-quality materials and design sought by the firm and the MDC. It was built in 1920 on the site of the Ralph Houghton house which was built in 1690 and demolished in 1896 to make way for the development of the Blue Hills Reservation. It was added to the National Register of Historic Places as Refreshment Pavillion on September 25, 1980. It is still in use as a refreshment stand.

== Gallery ==
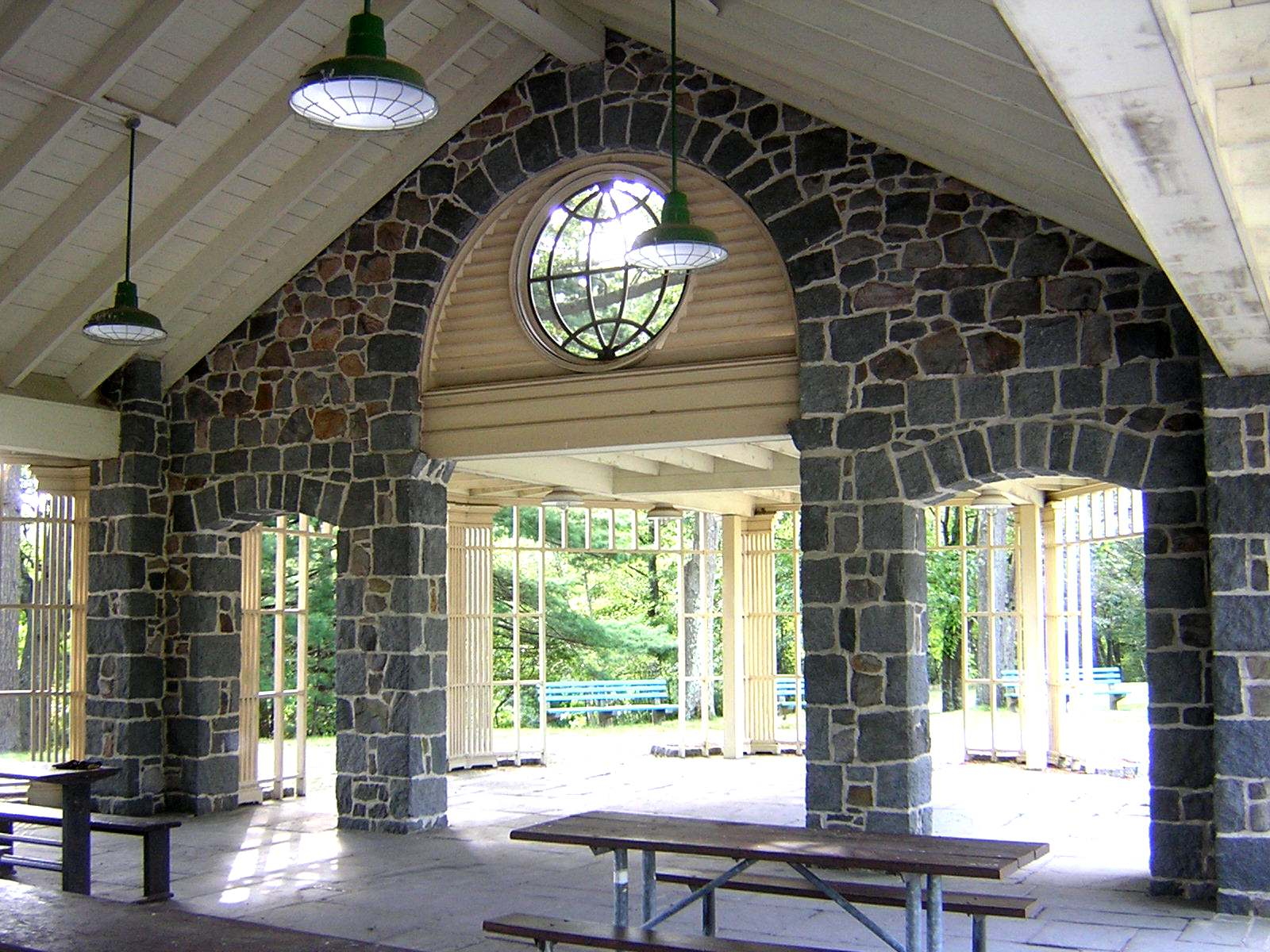
View to the southwest

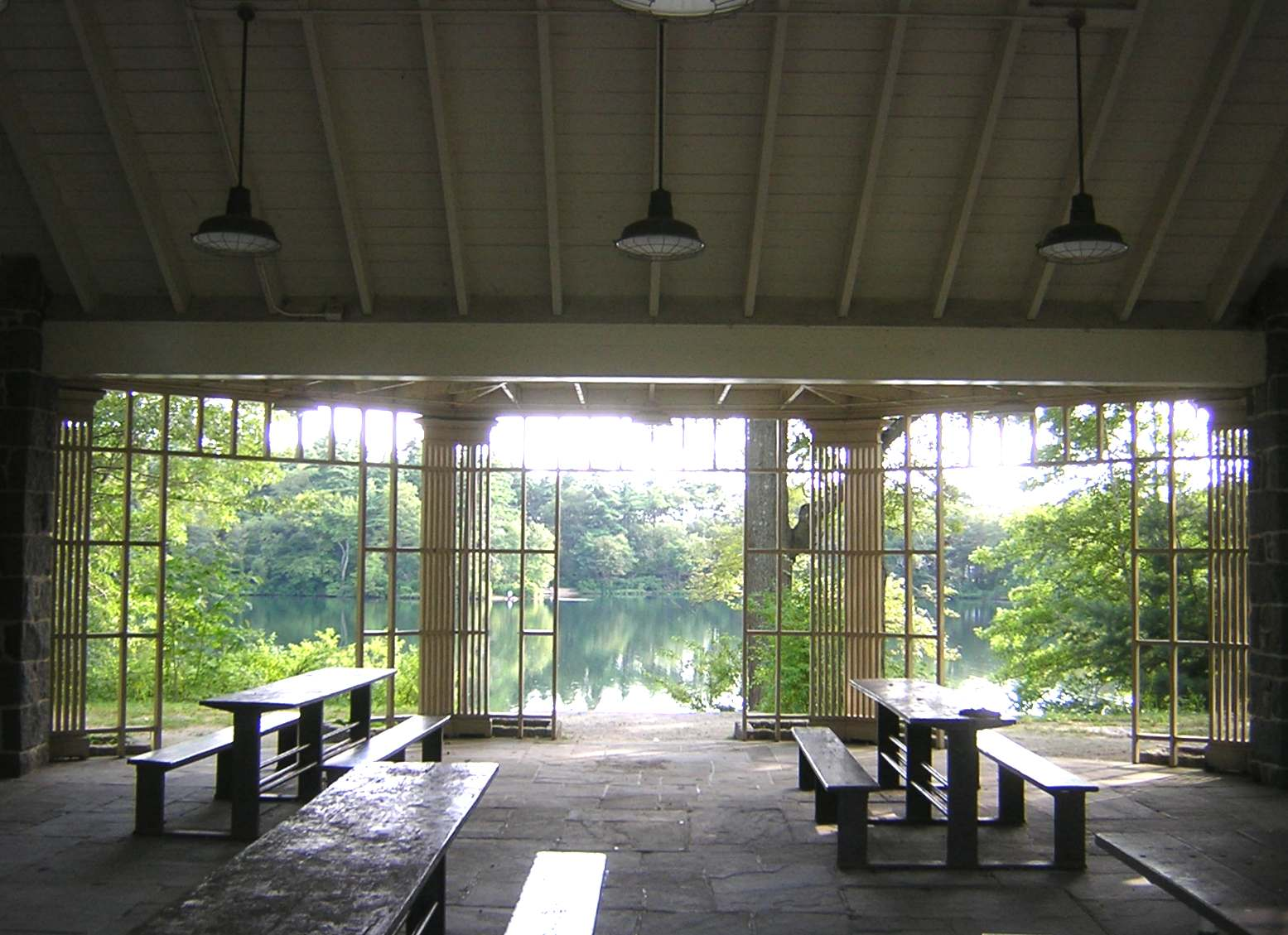
View to the south, over Houghton's Pond

== See also ==
- National Register of Historic Places listings in Milton, Massachusetts
