= Eliot Memorial Bridge =

- U.S. National Register of Historic Places
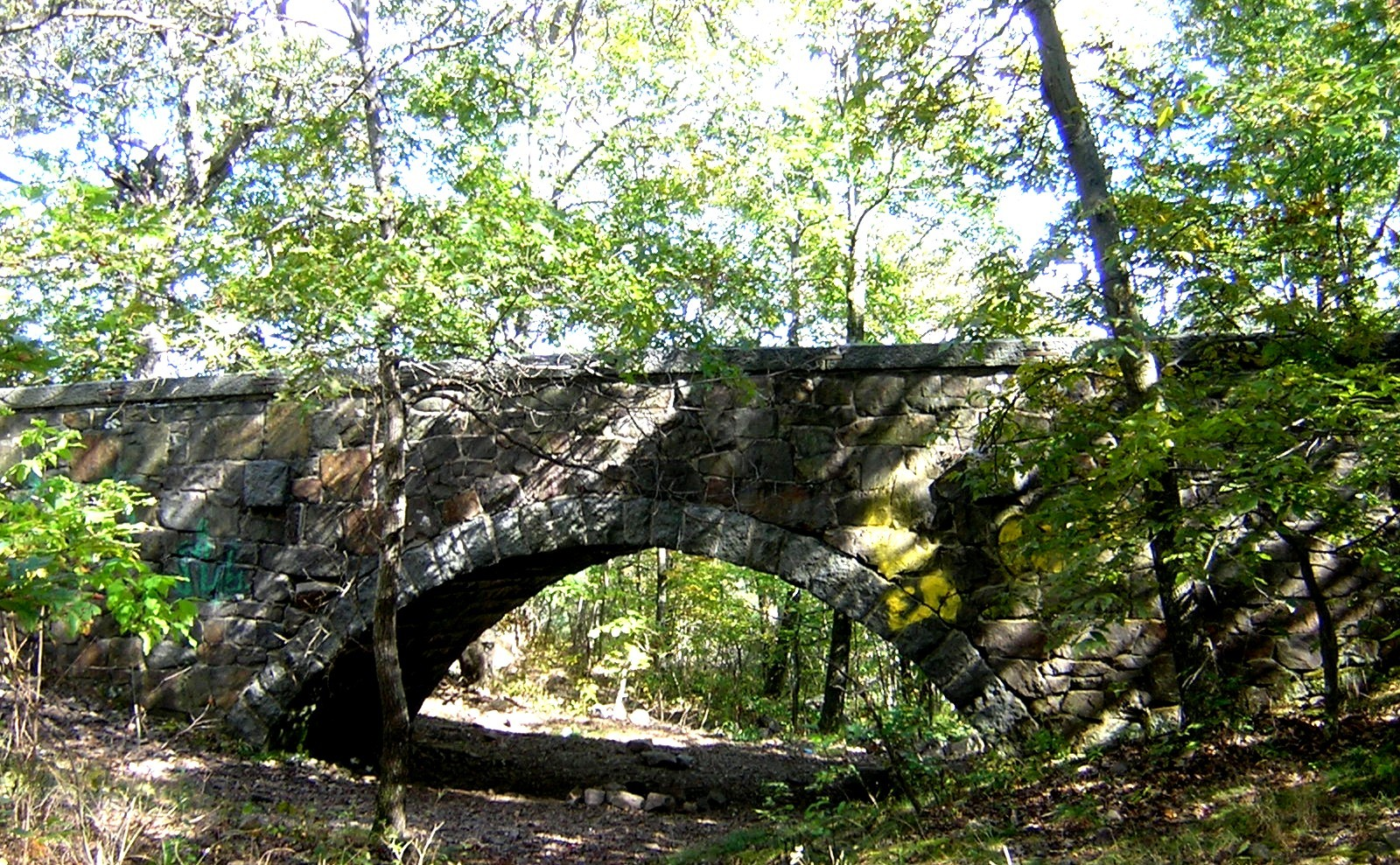

- Location within Massachusetts Location within the United States
- Location: Milton, Milton, Massachusetts
- Coordinates: 42°12′48.5″N 71°6′44.5″W
- Built: 1905
- MPS: Blue Hills and Neponset River Reservations MRA
- NRHP reference No.: 80000662
- Added to NRHP: September 25, 1980

The Eliot Memorial Bridge is a footbridge which was built in 1904 in memory of Charles Eliot, landscape architect to the Metropolitan Park Commission. It is located on the Skyline Trail near the summit of Great Blue Hill in the Blue Hills Reservation, south of Boston, Massachusetts. Eliot was a driving force in the establishment of many of the Greater Boston area's early parks, including the Blue Hill Reservation. The bridge was built out of locally quarried granite, and completed c. 1905–06. Built into its structure are a bench and commemorative plaque. The bridge, which crosses a small ravine, is a remarkably large and sturdy structure for the location. The bridge is in neighborhood to the Great Blue Hill Observation Tower, near the 635-foot (194 m) summit of Great Blue Hill, a few hundred yards from and a little below the Great Blue Hill Weather Observatory, which is at the top of the mountain. The view from the observation tower toward the Observatory and its forest of radio, TV, and microwave antennas, is obscured by trees.

The bridge was added to the National Register of Historic Places in 1980.

== Gallery ==
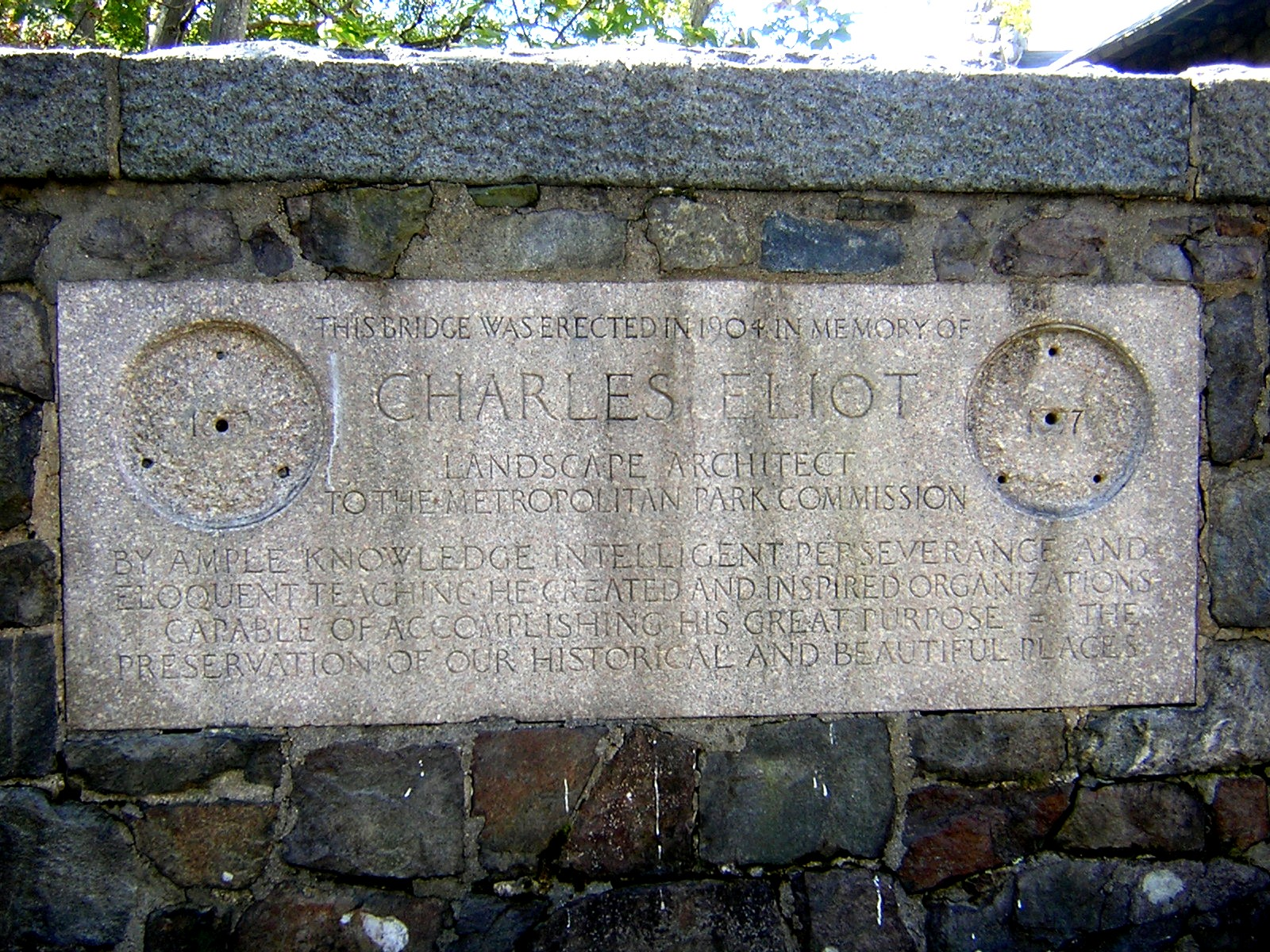

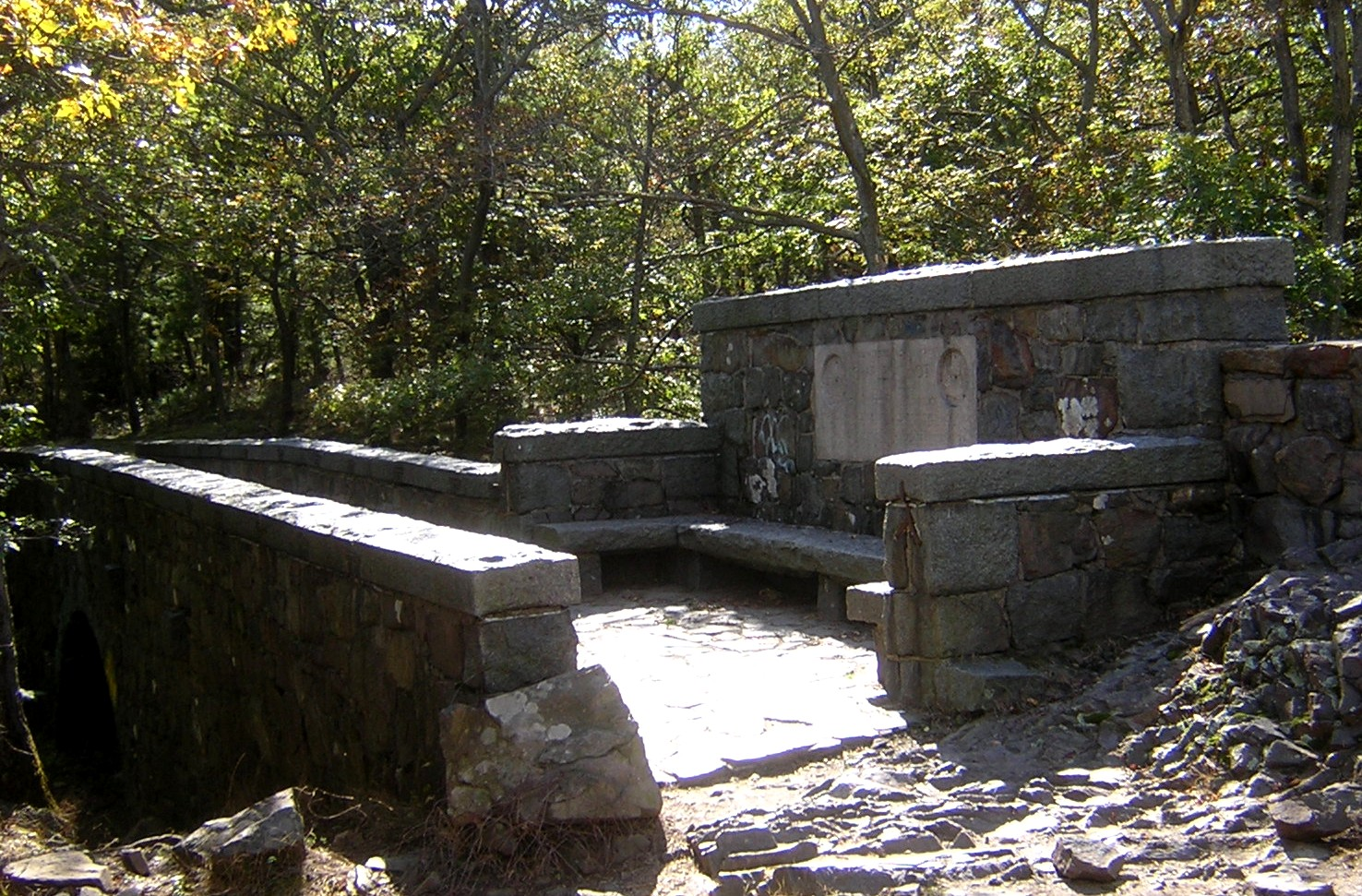

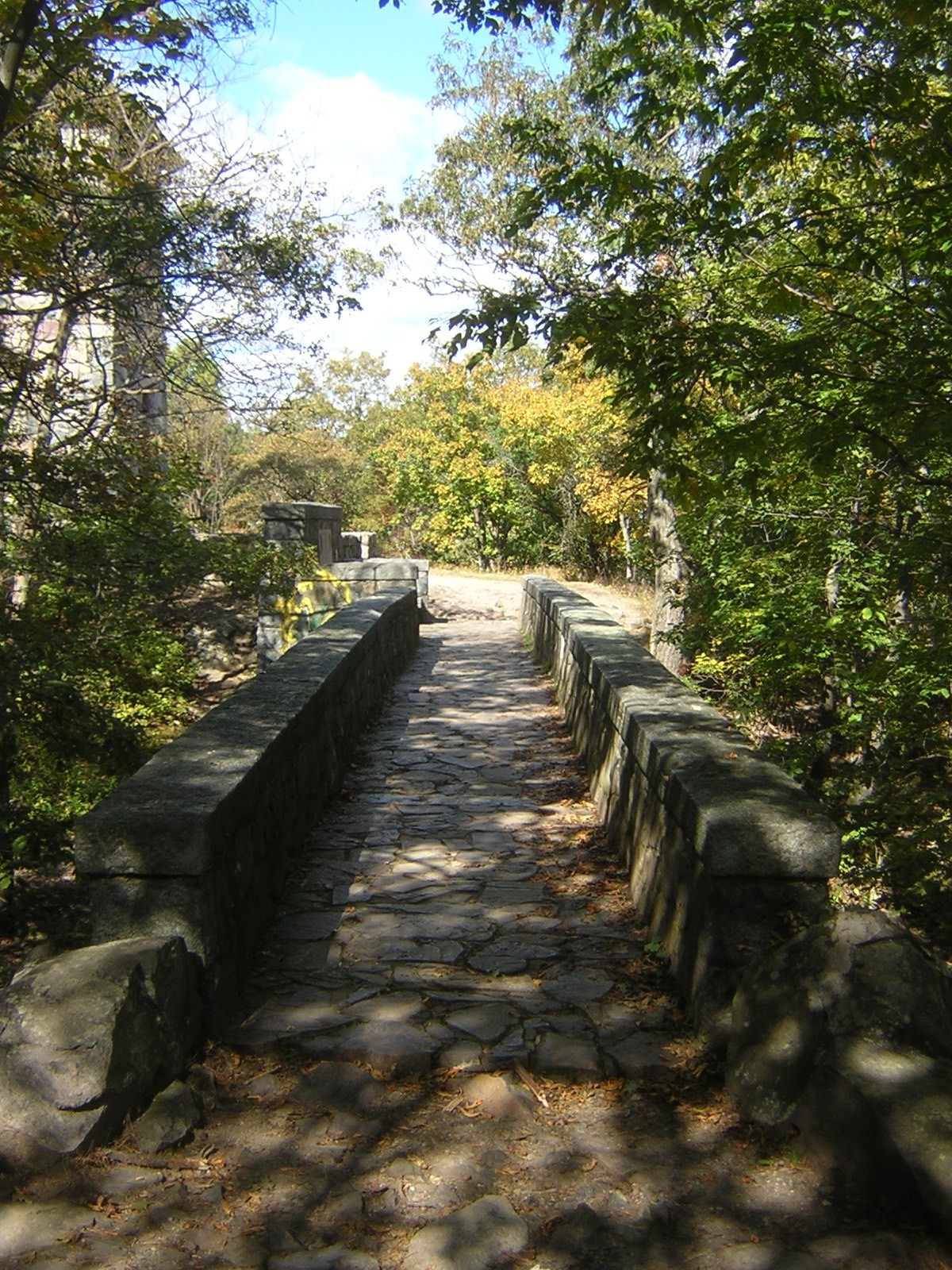

== See also ==
- National Register of Historic Places listings in Milton, Massachusetts
