= Chickatawbut Observation Tower =

- U.S. National Register of Historic Places
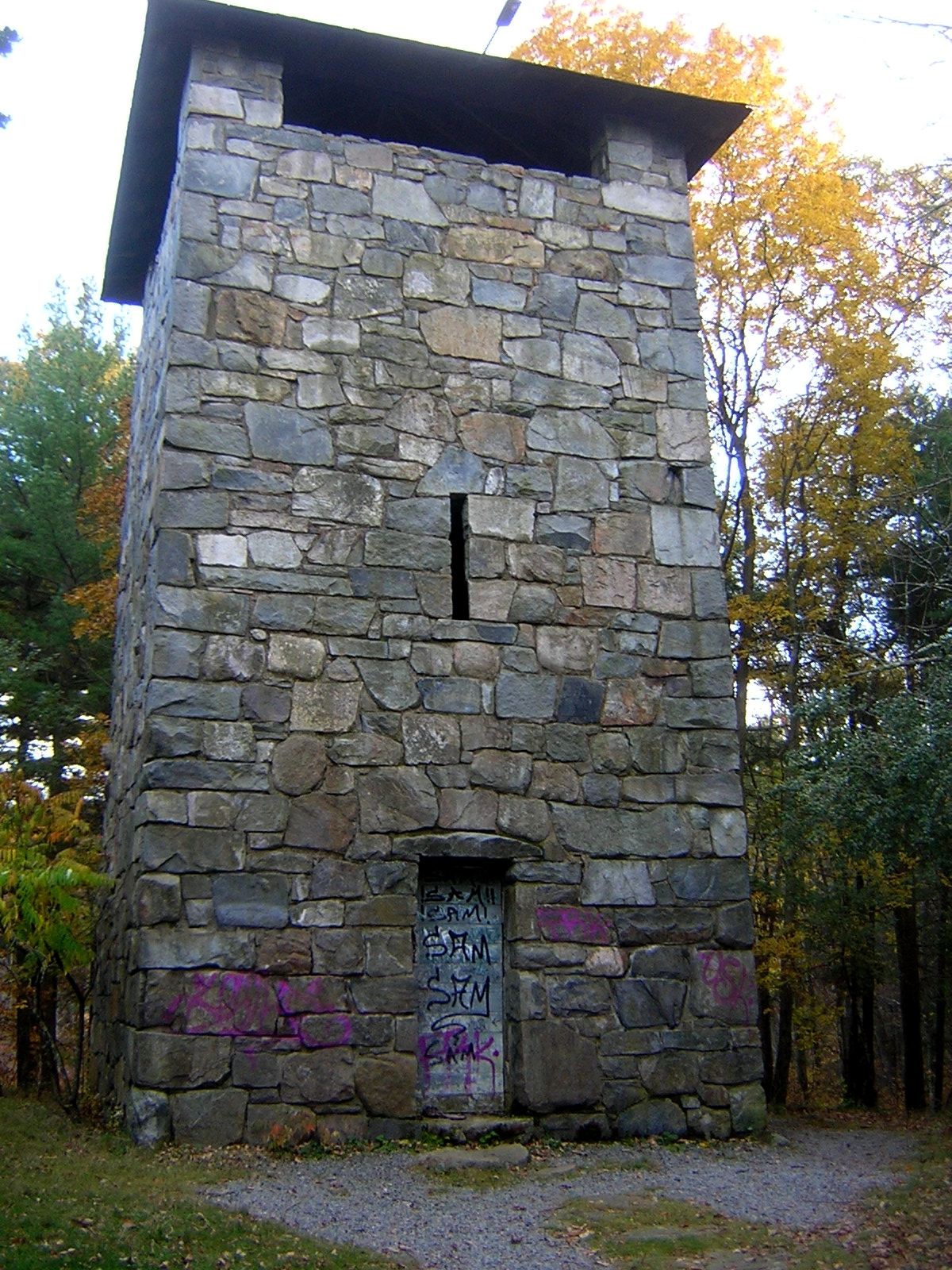

- Location within Massachusetts Location within the United States
- Location: Chickatawbut Rd., Quincy, Massachusetts
- Coordinates: 42°13′30.2″N 71°3′38.5″W
- MPS: Blue Hills and Neponset River Reservations MRA
- NRHP reference No.: 80000652
- Added to NRHP: September 25, 1980

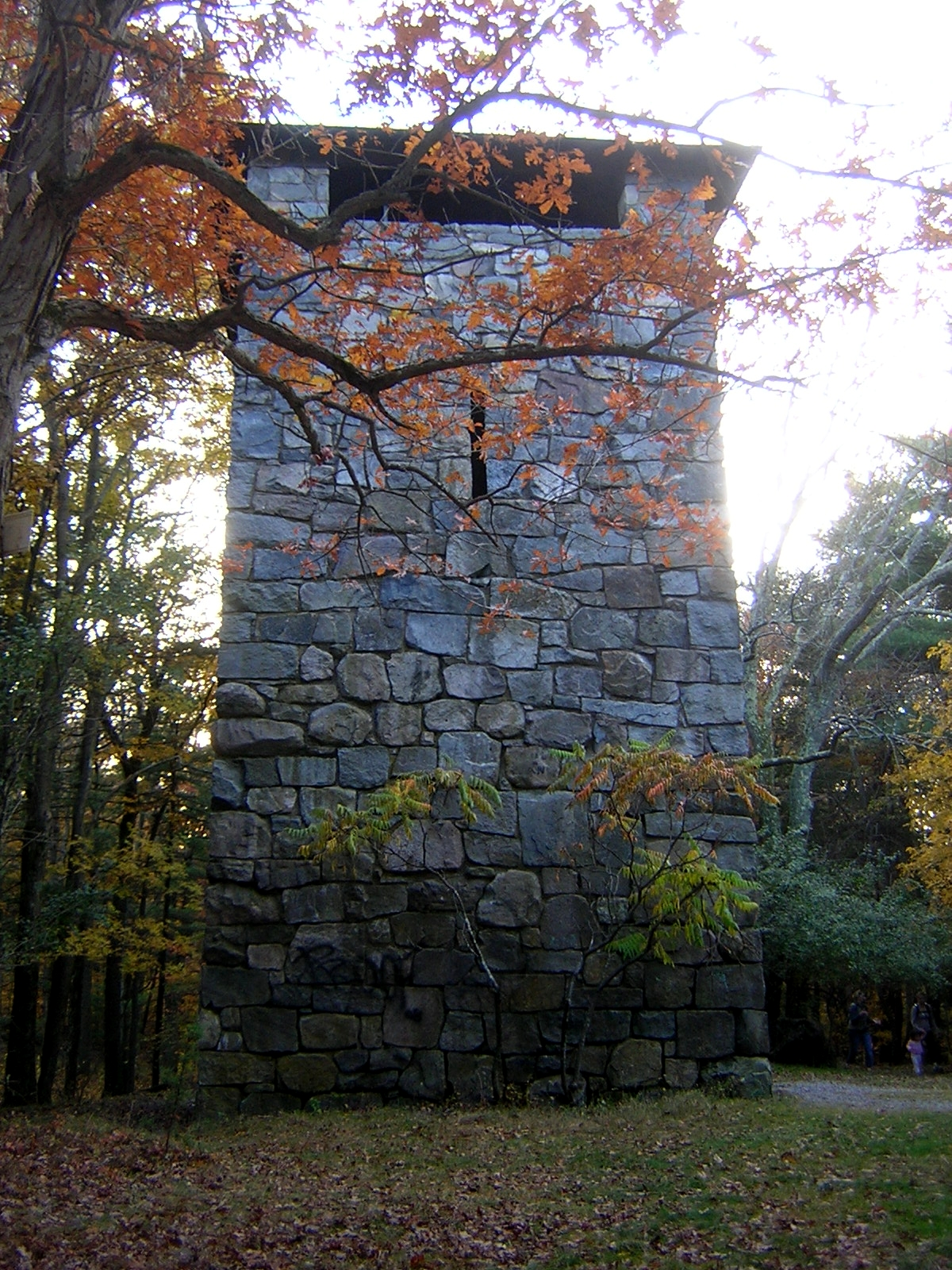

The Chickatawbut Observation Tower is a historic tower on Chickatawbut Road in Quincy, Massachusetts, in the Blue Hill Reservation, a Massachusetts state park.

Unlike Great Blue Hill Observation Tower, a similar tower at the opposite end of the reservation, Chickatawbut tower is not open to the public. The tower was built by the Civilian Conservation Corps in the 1930s. It is named for Chickatawbut, who was a 17th-century sachem of the Massachusett Indian tribe.

The tower was added to the National Register of Historic Places in 1980.

== See also ==
- National Register of Historic Places listings in Quincy, Massachusetts
