= Blue Hills Reservation =

State park in Norfolk County, Massachusetts, US

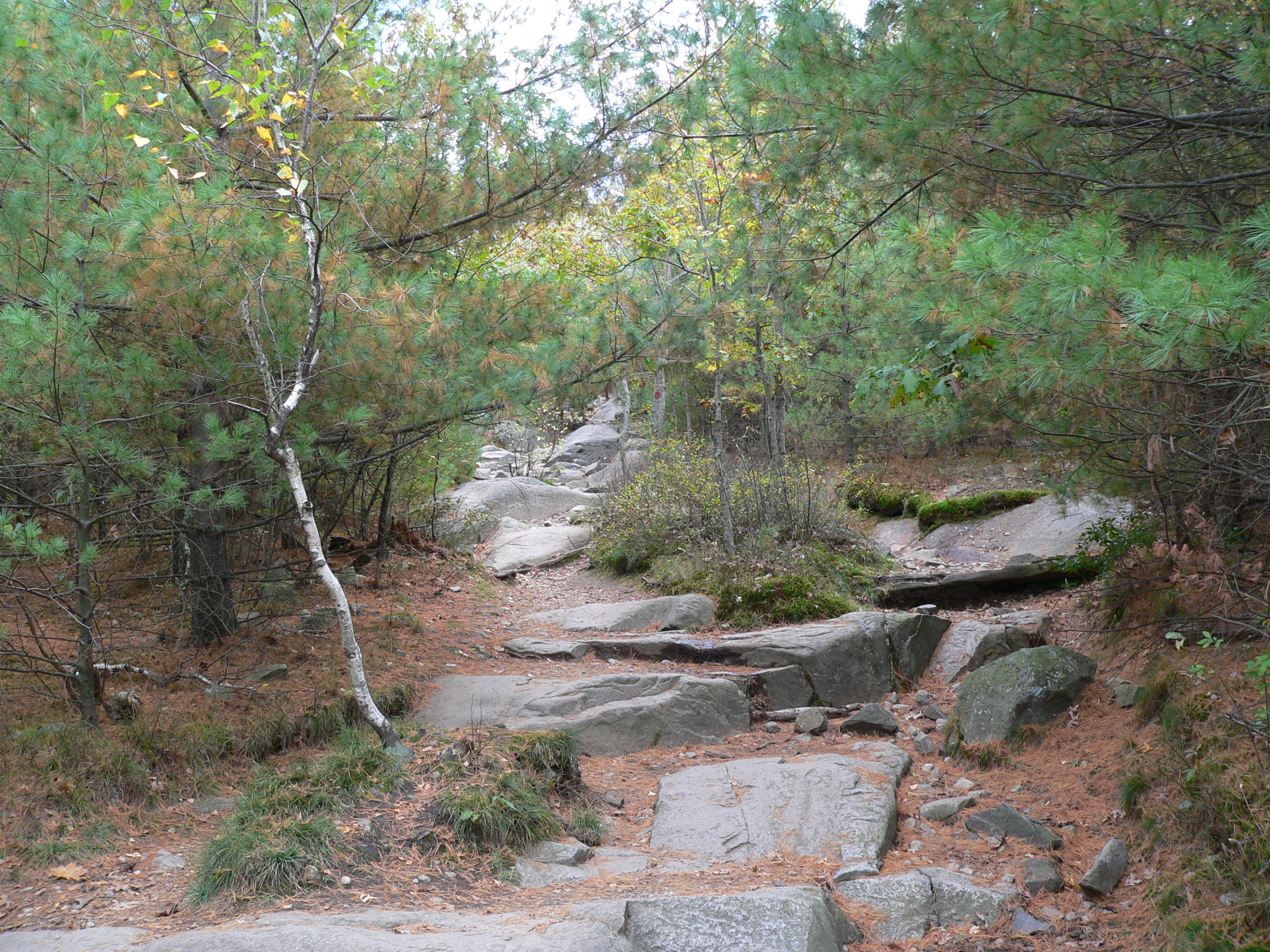
- Trail on Great Blue Hill, the tallest point in the reservation

- Location within Massachusetts Location within the United States
- Location: Norfolk County, Massachusetts, United States
- Coordinates: 42°12′44″N 71°06′51″W
- Area: 7,000 acres (28 km^{2})
- Elevation: 633 ft (193 m)
- Established: 1893
- Administrator: Massachusetts Department of Conservation and Recreation
- Website: Official website

Blue Hills Reservation is a 7,000-acre (2,800 ha) state park in Norfolk County, Massachusetts, United States. Managed by the Massachusetts Department of Conservation and Recreation, it covers parts of Milton, Quincy, Braintree, Canton, Randolph, and Dedham. Located approximately ten miles (16 km) south of downtown Boston, the reservation is one of the largest parcels of undeveloped conservation land within the Greater Boston metropolitan area. The park's varied terrain and scenic views make it a popular destination for hikers from the Boston area.

== History ==
Sailors along on the coastline noticed the bluish hue of the mountains, which is caused by the presence of riebeckite, giving the area its modern name. The name of the state of Massachusetts derives from the Massachusett Indian tribe's name of the hill: massa-adchu-es-et. In 1893, the Metropolitan Parks Commission purchased the lands of Blue Hills Reservation as one of the state's first areas dedicated to public recreation.

The practice of First Day Hikes to mark New Year's Day with an outdoor activity began in 1992 at Blue Hills Reservation. By the 2010s, the idea had spread and such hikes were taking place in state parks nationwide.

== Flora and fauna ==
The ecology of the Blue Hills is diverse and includes marshes, swamps, upland and bottomland forests, meadows, and an Atlantic white cedar bog. A number of endangered species in Massachusetts, such as the timber rattlesnake and copperhead snake, reside in the reservation. Other flora and fauna include dogwood, lady's slipper, white-tailed deer, coyotes, wild turkey, red fox, and turkey vultures.

== Climate ==
The reservation experiences a humid continental climate (Köppen: Dfa), typical of most of New England. Summers are short but very warm with mild nights. Winters are short, very snowy, and very cloudy. Precipitation is heavy and very consistent year round.

Climate data for Blue Hills Reservation (Blue Hill Meteorological Observatory), 1991−2020 normals, extremes 1893−present
| Month | Jan | Feb | Mar | Apr | May | Jun | Jul | Aug | Sep | Oct | Nov | Dec | Year |
|---|---|---|---|---|---|---|---|---|---|---|---|---|---|
| Record high °F (°C) | 68 (20) | 71 (22) | 89 (32) | 94 (34) | 96 (36) | 99 (37) | 100 (38) | 101 (38) | 99 (37) | 88 (31) | 81 (27) | 74 (23) | 101 (38) |
| Mean maximum °F (°C) | 56.6 (13.7) | 56.9 (13.8) | 65.6 (18.7) | 79.4 (26.3) | 87.3 (30.7) | 90.0 (32.2) | 92.9 (33.8) | 91.3 (32.9) | 86.9 (30.5) | 77.6 (25.3) | 68.4 (20.2) | 60.0 (15.6) | 94.7 (34.8) |
| Mean daily maximum °F (°C) | 34.7 (1.5) | 37.0 (2.8) | 44.1 (6.7) | 56.3 (13.5) | 66.8 (19.3) | 75.4 (24.1) | 81.7 (27.6) | 80.2 (26.8) | 72.7 (22.6) | 61.0 (16.1) | 50.1 (10.1) | 40.2 (4.6) | 58.4 (14.6) |
| Daily mean °F (°C) | 26.5 (−3.1) | 28.2 (−2.1) | 35.5 (1.9) | 47.1 (8.4) | 58.5 (14.7) | 66.5 (19.2) | 72.7 (22.6) | 71.4 (21.9) | 64.2 (17.9) | 52.5 (11.4) | 42.0 (5.6) | 32.5 (0.3) | 49.8 (9.9) |
| Mean daily minimum °F (°C) | 18.3 (−7.6) | 19.5 (−6.9) | 26.9 (−2.8) | 37.9 (3.3) | 48.2 (9.0) | 57.6 (14.2) | 63.8 (17.7) | 62.6 (17.0) | 55.6 (13.1) | 44.0 (6.7) | 33.8 (1.0) | 24.9 (−3.9) | 41.1 (5.1) |
| Mean minimum °F (°C) | 0.0 (−17.8) | 3.1 (−16.1) | 10.1 (−12.2) | 26.7 (−2.9) | 37.5 (3.1) | 45.9 (7.7) | 54.9 (12.7) | 53.4 (11.9) | 42.3 (5.7) | 30.5 (−0.8) | 19.6 (−6.9) | 8.7 (−12.9) | −2.5 (−19.2) |
| Record low °F (°C) | −14 (−26) | −21 (−29) | −5 (−21) | 6 (−14) | 27 (−3) | 36 (2) | 44 (7) | 39 (4) | 28 (−2) | 21 (−6) | 5 (−15) | −19 (−28) | −21 (−29) |
| Average precipitation inches (mm) | 4.50 (114) | 4.00 (102) | 5.52 (140) | 4.76 (121) | 3.82 (97) | 4.63 (118) | 3.47 (88) | 3.91 (99) | 4.06 (103) | 5.49 (139) | 4.31 (109) | 5.39 (137) | 53.86 (1,367) |
| Average snowfall inches (cm) | 18.6 (47) | 18.2 (46) | 15.0 (38) | 2.8 (7.1) | 0.0 (0.0) | 0.0 (0.0) | 0.0 (0.0) | 0.0 (0.0) | 0.0 (0.0) | 0.7 (1.8) | 1.8 (4.6) | 12.6 (32) | 69.7 (176.5) |
| Average extreme snow depth inches (cm) | 10.6 (27) | 11.5 (29) | 9.8 (25) | 2.6 (6.6) | 0.0 (0.0) | 0.0 (0.0) | 0.0 (0.0) | 0.0 (0.0) | 0.0 (0.0) | 0.3 (0.76) | 1.3 (3.3) | 7.7 (20) | 17.1 (43) |
| Average precipitation days (≥ 0.01 in) | 13.2 | 11.3 | 12.5 | 12.5 | 13.0 | 12.1 | 10.5 | 10.2 | 9.2 | 11.5 | 10.9 | 12.6 | 139.5 |
| Average snowy days (≥ 0.1 in) | 8.1 | 7.1 | 5.7 | 1.3 | 0.0 | 0.0 | 0.0 | 0.0 | 0.0 | 0.4 | 1.3 | 5.3 | 29.2 |
| Mean monthly sunshine hours | 132.1 | 146.7 | 174.0 | 185.6 | 220.2 | 231.8 | 258.1 | 242.5 | 204.1 | 182.1 | 133.3 | 125.9 | 2,236.4 |
| Percentage possible sunshine | 46.3 | 50.9 | 48.5 | 47.9 | 50.4 | 52.7 | 58.0 | 58.7 | 56.7 | 55.1 | 47.0 | 45.9 | 51.5 |
Source 1: NOAA
Source 2: BHO

== Points of interest ==
=== Observatory ===
The highest point within the reservation, Great Blue Hill in Milton, is the site of the historic Blue Hill Meteorological Observatory. The observatory was founded in 1885 and is the oldest continuous weather recording station in the United States. Its tower offers views of Boston and the surrounding area. The tower and observatory are among numerous reservation features listed on the National Register of Historic Places.

=== Features listed on the National Register of Historic Places ===
| Name | Location | Image | Remarks |
|---|---|---|---|
| Blue Hills State Police Station H-7 | Hillside Street, Milton | | |
| Blue Hills Reservation Parkways | Milton, Quincy, Braintree, Canton | | |
| Brookwood Farm | Hillside Street, Milton | | |
| Chickatawbut Observation Tower | Chickatawbut Road, Quincy | | |
| Comfort Station | Blue Hill Avenue, Milton | | |
| Eliot Memorial Bridge | Milton | | |
| Great Blue Hill Observation Tower | Milton | | |
| Great Blue Hill Weather Observatory | Milton | | |
| Massachusetts Hornfels-Braintree Slate Quarry | Milton | | |
| Metropolitan District Commission Stable | Hillside Street, Milton | | |
| Old Barn | Blue Hill River Road, Canton | | |
| Ponkapoag Camp of Appalachian Mountain Club | Randolph | | |
| Refreshment Pavilion | Hillside Street, Milton | | |

=== Blue Hills Trailside Museum ===
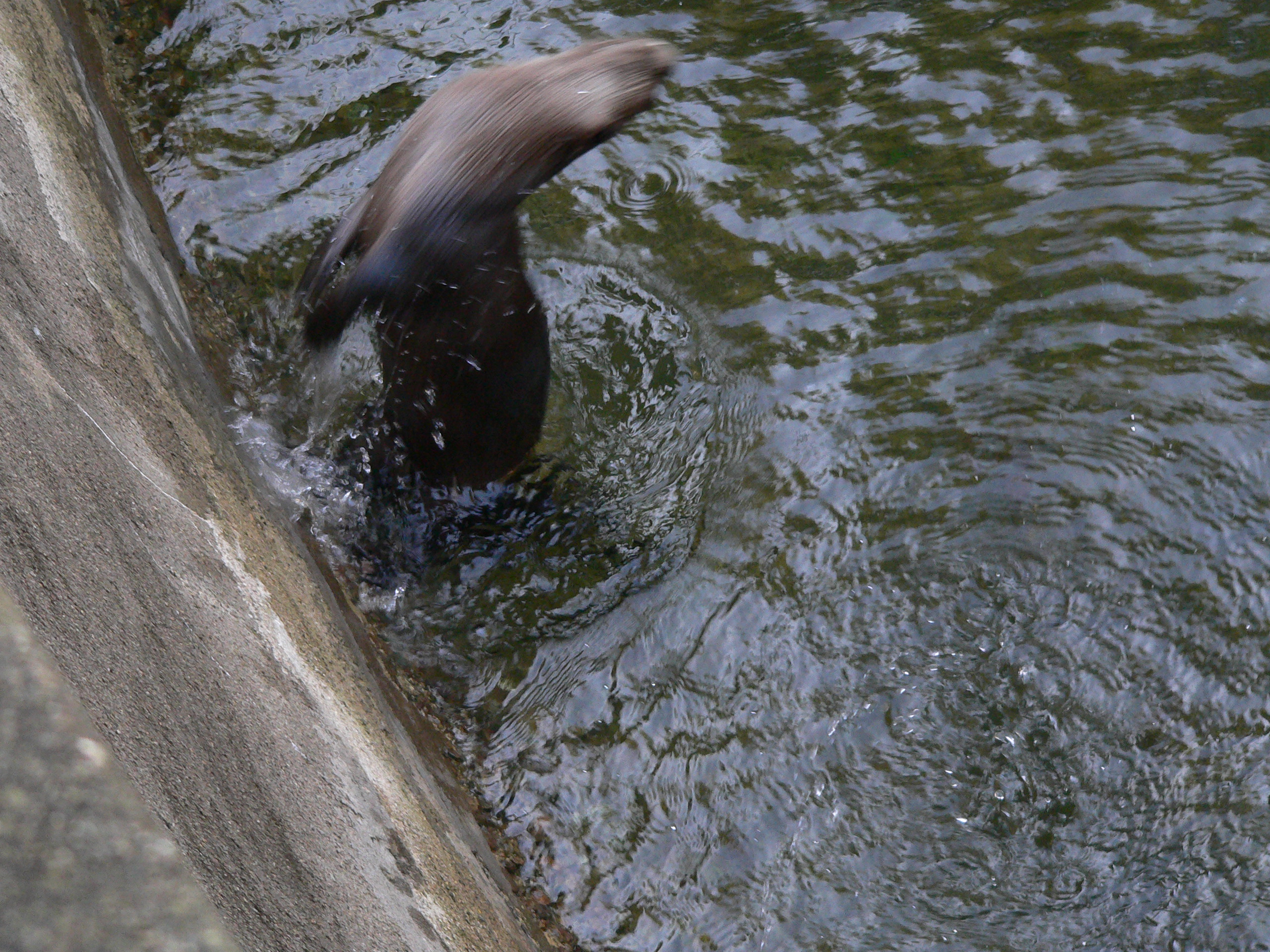
Otter at Blue Hills Trailside Museum

The Blue Hills Trailside Museum, which is operated by the Massachusetts Audubon Society, offers indoor and outdoor animal exhibits. The museum opened in 1959, and was initially operated by the Museum of Science. Mass Audubon began operating the museum in 1974.

=== Houghton's Pond Recreation Area ===
Houghton's Pond is located within Blue Hills Reservation.

== Activities and amenities ==
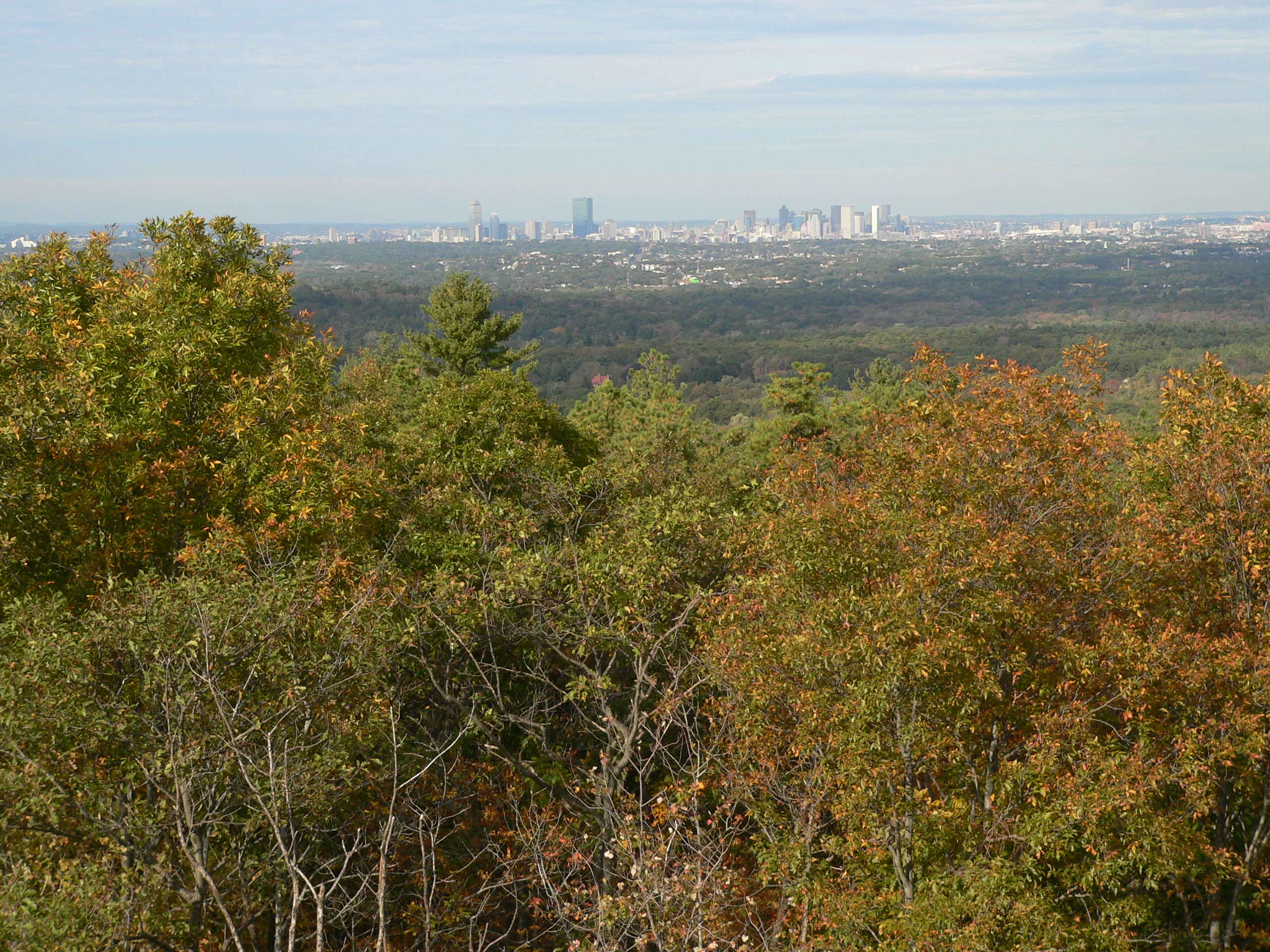
View of Boston skyline

Blue Hills Reservation is primarily used for hiking and mountain biking. It is also used for snowshoeing, downhill skiing, snowboarding, and cross country skiing during winter, and rock climbing (in certain areas) and horseback riding during permissible months. Between approximately December and March, Great Blue Hill offers a ski area. Houghton's Pond and nearby Ponkapoag Pond are popular swimming and recreation areas during the summer. Other recreational opportunities include non-motorized boating, camping, fishing, picnicking, playing fields, ice skating, interpretive programs, and a children's playground is accessible from the Hillside St entrance to Houghton's Pond.
