= Metropolitan District Commission Stable =

- U.S. National Register of Historic Places
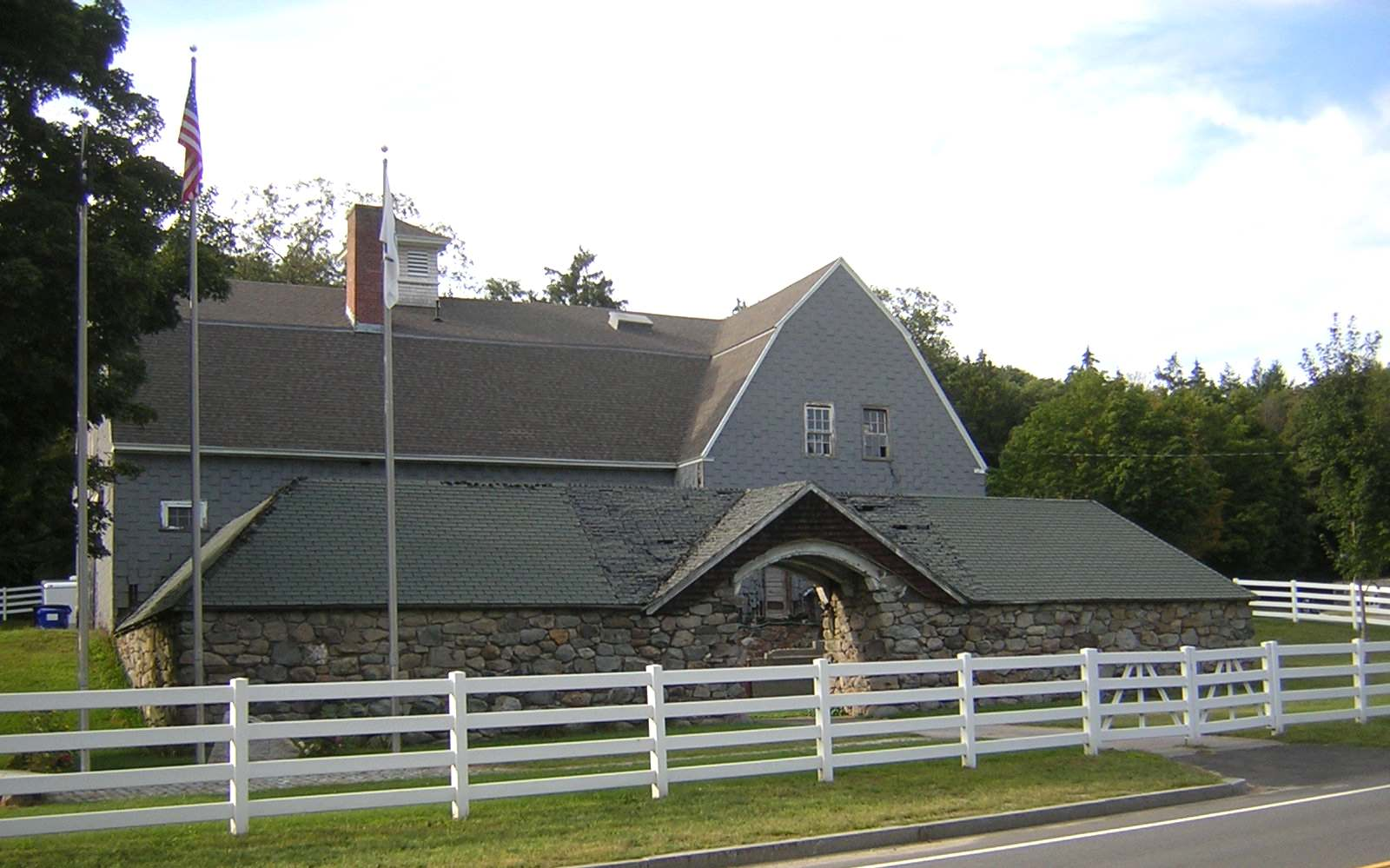
- Southeast side

- Location within Massachusetts Location within the United States
- Location: Hillside St., Milton, Massachusetts
- Coordinates: 42°12′50.5″N 71°5′37.5″W
- Area: less than one acre
- Built: 1908
- Architect: Stickney & Austin
- Architectural style: Shingle Style
- MPS: Blue Hills and Neponset River Reservations MRA
- NRHP reference No.: 80000663
- Added to NRHP: September 25, 1980

The Metropolitan District Commission Stable is a historic stable on Hillside Street in Milton, Massachusetts. Built around the turn of the 20th century, it is part of a headquarters complex designed by Stickney & Austin for the Metropolitan Parks Commission (a predecessor to the Metropolitan District Commission or MDC, and today's Department of Conservation and Recreation) when the Blue Hills Reservation was being developed for recreational use. The building is a good example of Shingle style architecture, and was listed on the National Register of Historic Places in 1980.

== Description and history ==
The MDC stable is located on the south side of the Blue Hills, on the north side of Hillside Road in Milton east of Massachusetts Route 138. It is part of a suite of buildings, three of which were designed by Stickney & Austin for use in park administration. The other Stickney & Austin buildings are the superintendent's residence and the Blue Hills Headquarters building, which now serves as a police barracks. The fourth building is a Cape style house which housed the MPC's district office; it pre-existed construction of the other buildings.

The stable is a large two-story gable-roofed structure, set on an rise above Hillside Street, Due to the sloping terrain, an exposed stone-walled single-story section stands between the road and the main structure; this part is topped by a hip roof and features an entry near its center, sheltered by an arch and gable. The main portion of the structure is basically rectangular, with a slightly projecting cross gable at the northeast end, giving it a slight L shape. The northeast facade features a garage entrance with a half-round window above. The northwest facade has three wide gables with doorways at the second level providing bulk access to the second level, and small square or rectangular windows providing illumination to the lower level. The southwest facade is similar to that in the northeast, except it has a more elaborate window treatment above the garage entry.

The stable was built either in 1899 or 1908, when the park was being developed for more active recreational use. The stable was intended for use by the Metropolitan District Commission Police and the Massachusetts State Police mounted units. In 2004, the mounted units were disbanded and the stable was emptied. Although mounted units were reinstated in 2008, there were no plans to stable them here. A 2007 study identified significant issues with the structure that would need correction before it could again be used to stable horses. Repairs were made in 2014-15, but (as of 2017) additional work was still required, and the building was used for storage.

== Gallery ==
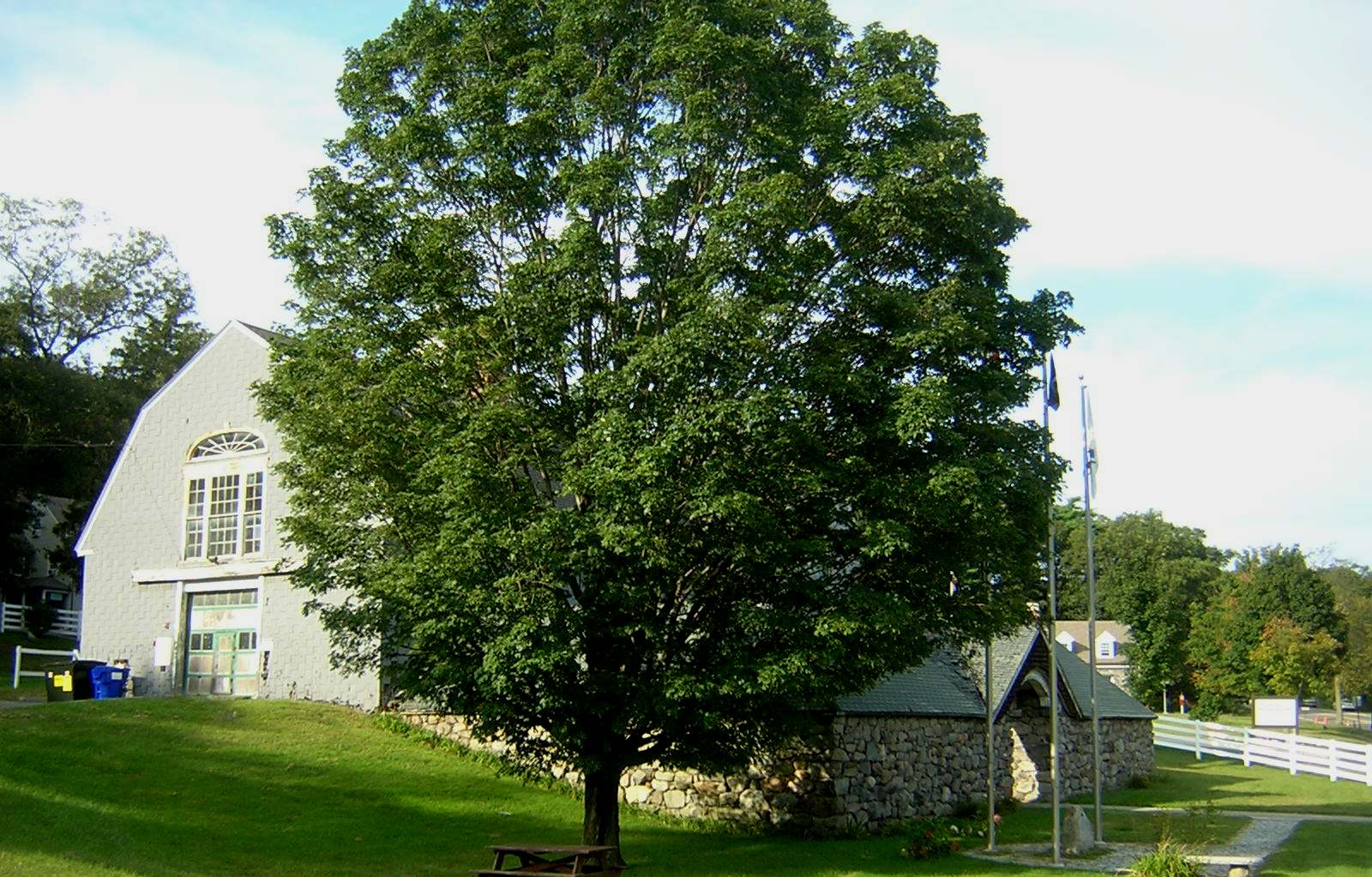
View from south

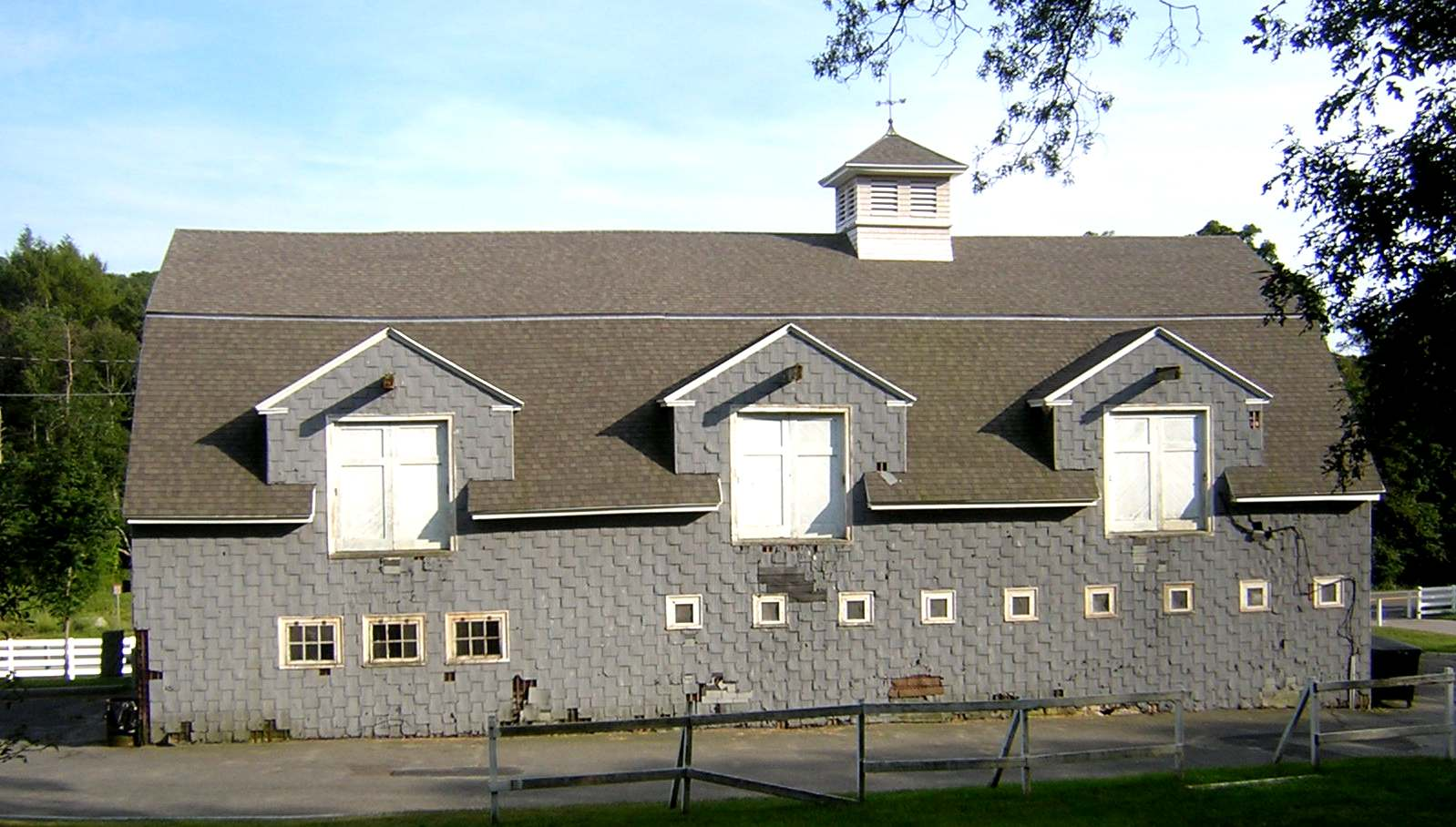
Northwest side

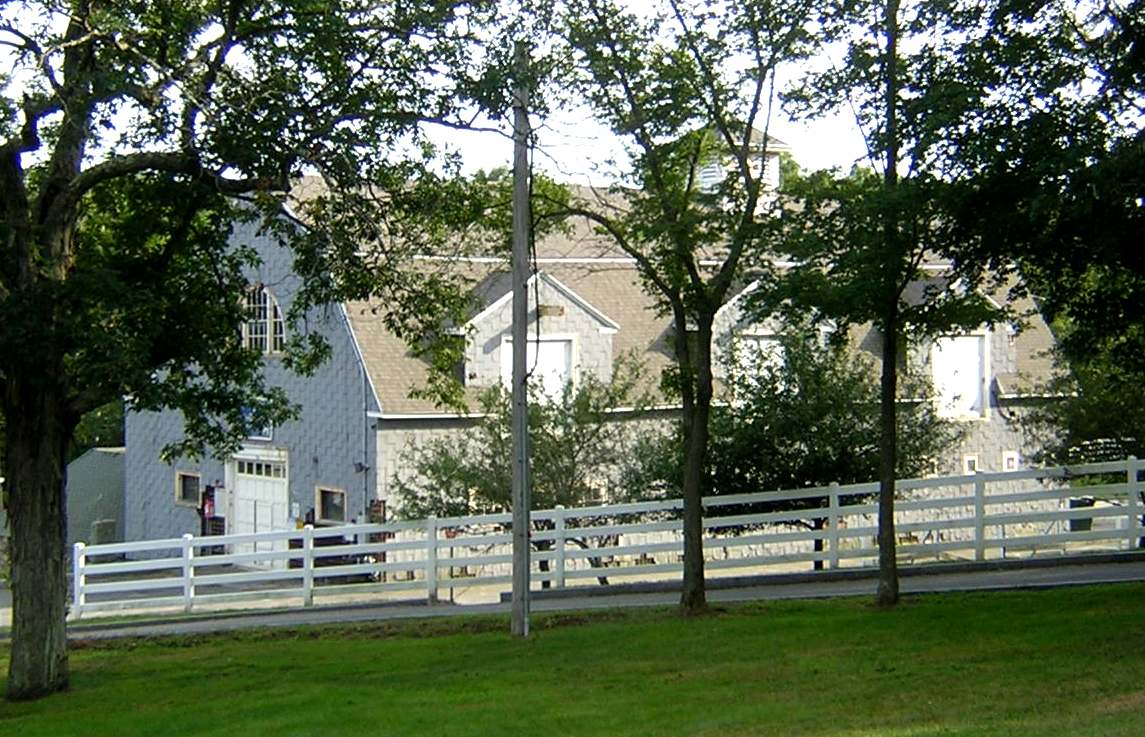
View from north

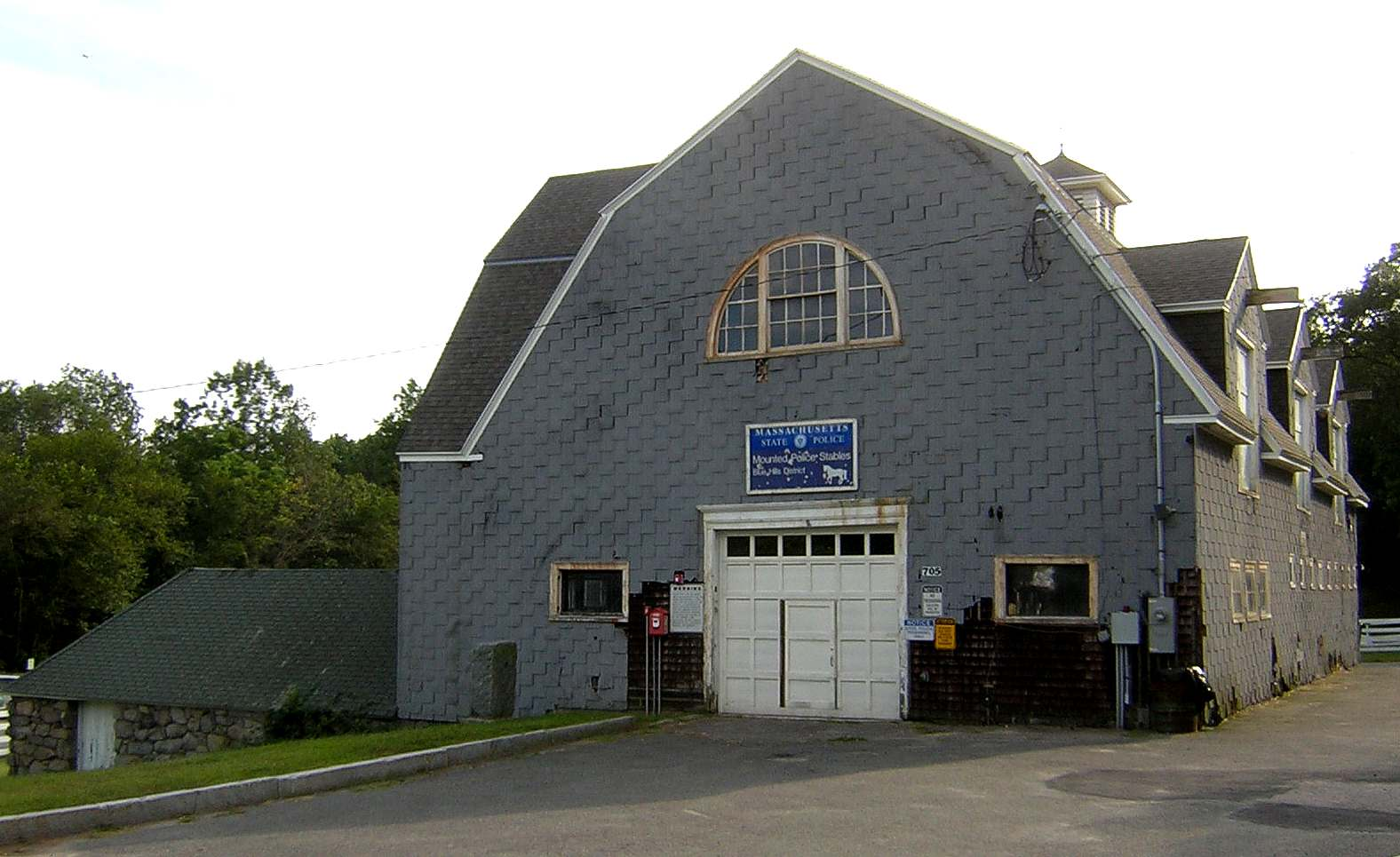
Northeast side

== See also ==
- National Register of Historic Places listings in Milton, Massachusetts
