= Great Blue Hill Observation Tower =

- U.S. National Register of Historic Places
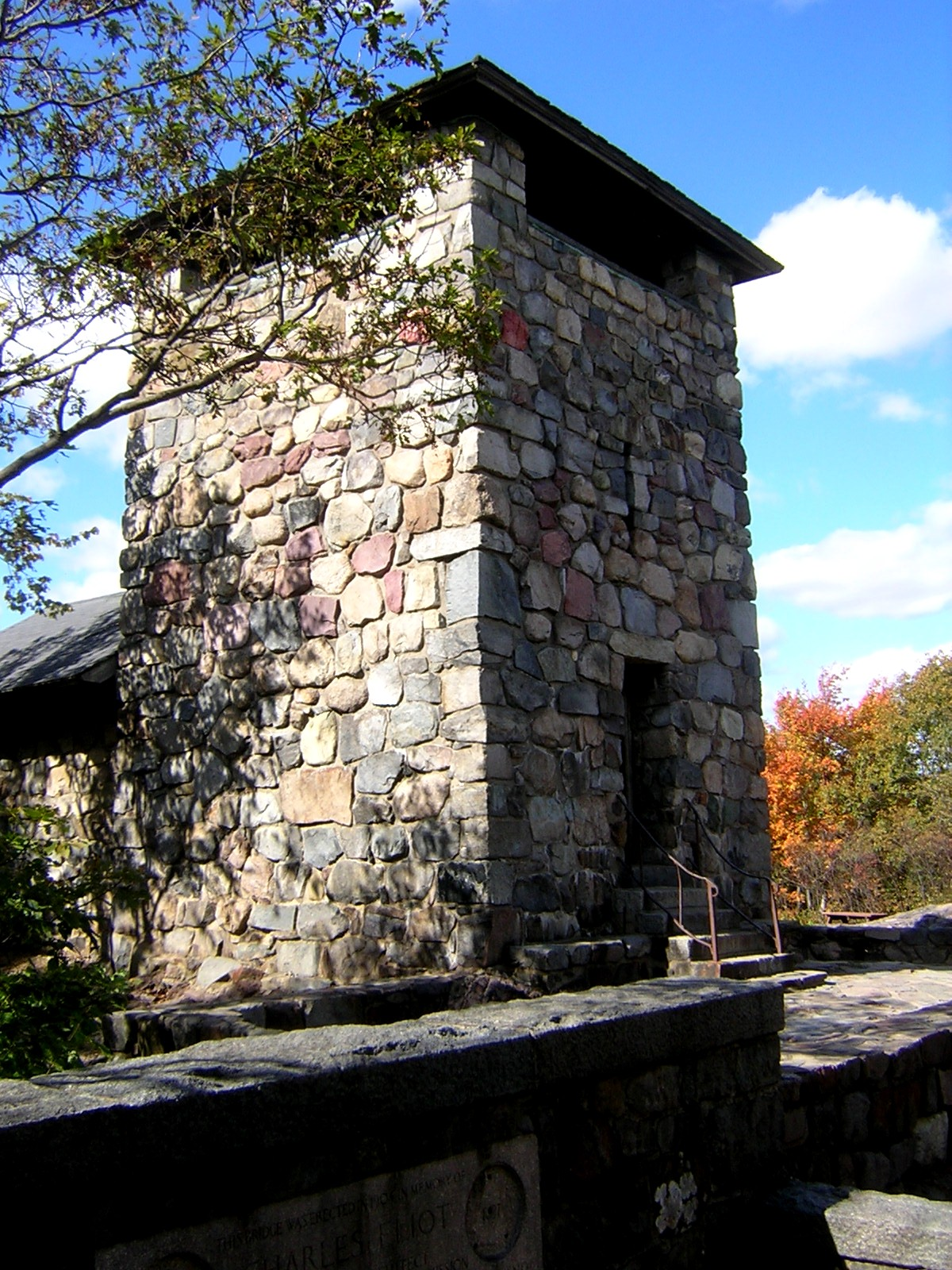

- Location within Massachusetts Location within the United States
- Location: near the summit of Great Blue Hill, Milton, Massachusetts
- Coordinates: 42°12′48.5″N 71°6′44.5″W
- Area: less than one acre
- Built: 1933-34
- Architectural style: CCC Rustic
- MPS: Blue Hills and Neponset River Reservations MRA
- NRHP reference No.: 80000661
- Added to NRHP: September 25, 1980

The Great Blue Hill Observation Tower, known locally as Eliot Tower, is a historic stone tower located near the summit of Great Blue Hill in Milton, Massachusetts. The tower was built in the 1930s by the Civilian Conservation Corps (CCC) and is a good example of the rustic architecture CCC projects were known for. The 35-foot-tall (11 m) tower provides views of about 270°, with only the view toward the actual hill summit obscured by vegetation. The tower was added to the National Register of Historic Places in 1980.

== Description and history ==
Eliot Tower stands a short way from the summit of Great Blue Hill in the Blue Hills Reservation south of Boston, Massachusetts. The actual summit of the hill is occupied by the Great Blue Hill Weather Observatory, which is separated from the tower by trees. The tower is a squat square structure, 35 feet (11 m) in height, topped by a pyramidal roof. There are wide rectangular openings beneath the roof, and the main entry to the tower is on its eastern face. The tower is joined to a single-story covered picnic pavilion, which is made from the same rubblestone as the tower. The tower is located directly adjacent to the Eliot Memorial Bridge, which predates it by about three decades. The tower offers a view over about 270°, including all of Boston, Boston Harbor, and much of the South Shore.

The tower was built in 1937-38 by a Civilian Conservation Corps crew stationed in the Blue Hills. This crew was also responsible for construction of the Chickatawbut Tower, which has similar features. The attached pavilion was modified in the 1950s to include a supply and utility room, which was removed during restorative work in 2023-2024. In the 1980s vandals destroyed the pavilion's original slate roof, which was subsequently replaced by the present faux-slate material. The 2023-2024 restoration work includes an educational space for programs run by the observatory, and limited improvements for disability access.

== Gallery ==
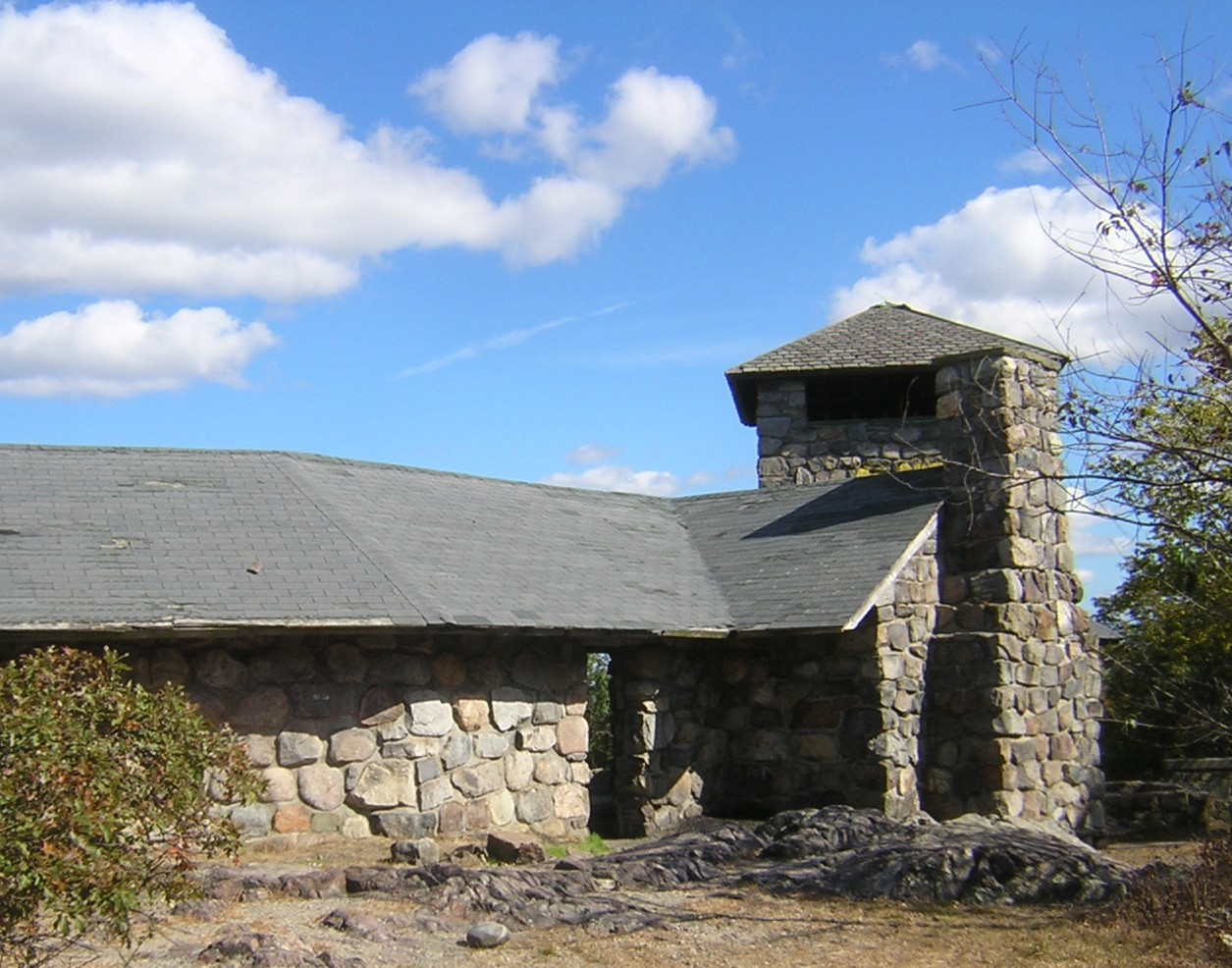

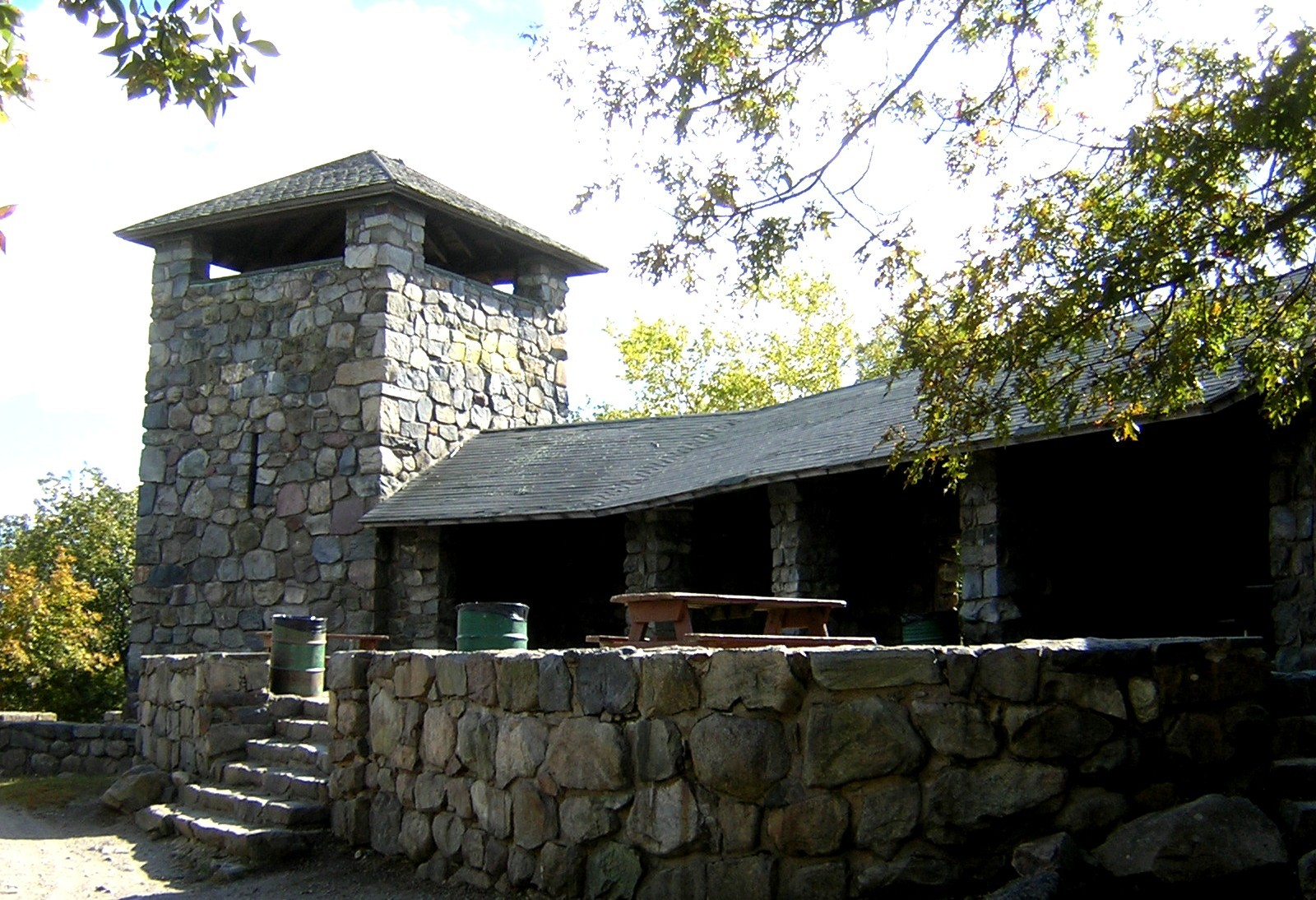

== See also ==
- National Register of Historic Places listings in Milton, Massachusetts
