= Ponkapoag Camp of Appalachian Mountain Club =

- U.S. National Register of Historic Places
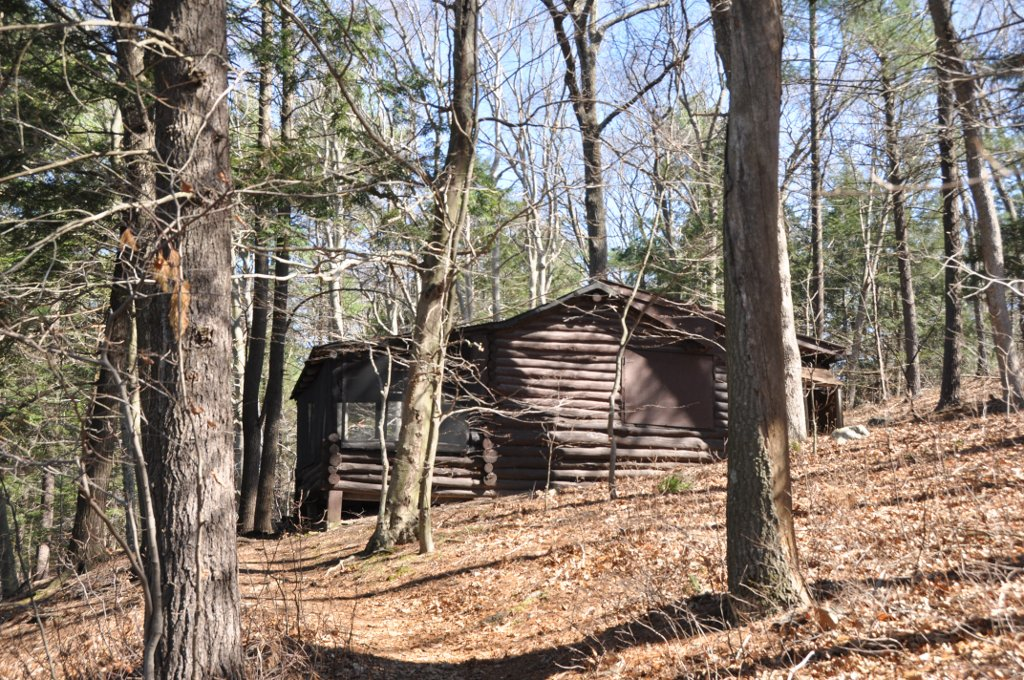
- The Folsom Cabin, one of the listed structures

- Location within Massachusetts Location within the United States
- Location: Randolph, Massachusetts
- Coordinates: 42°11′35″N 71°5′14″W
- Built: 1920
- MPS: Blue Hills and Neponset River Reservations MRA
- NRHP reference No.: 80000657
- Added to NRHP: September 25, 1980

The Ponkapoag Camp of Appalachian Mountain Club is a camp of the Appalachian Mountain Club located on the eastern shore of Ponkapoag Pond in Randolph, Massachusetts. The camp consists of a collection of 20 cabins, dispersed across a wooded area, that typically sleep 4-6 people. No electricity or potable water is available at the camp. In the summer the camp also makes available two tent sites for camping. The camp was established in 1921.

Two of the camp's oldest surviving cabins were listed on the National Register of Historic Places in 1980.

== See also ==
- National Register of Historic Places listings in Norfolk County, Massachusetts
