= Houghton's Pond =

Lake in Massachusetts, United States of America

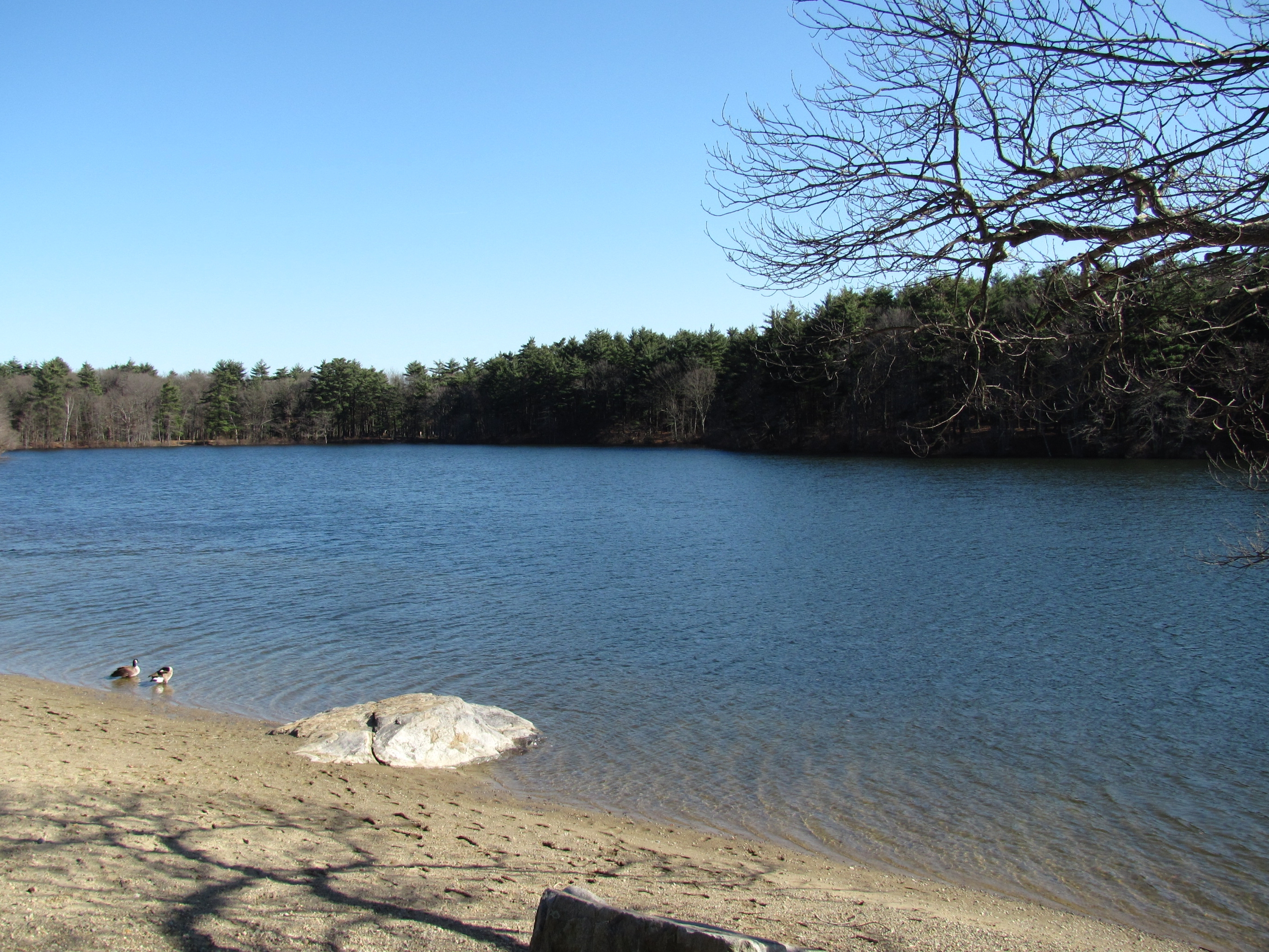
- Houghton's Pond

- Location within Massachusetts Location within the United States
- Location: Milton, Massachusetts
- Coordinates: 42°12′26″N 71°5′44″W
- Type: Glacial Pond
- Basin countries: United States
- Surface area: 24 acres (97,000 m^{2})
- Max. depth: 42 ft (13 m)

Houghton's Pond is a spring-fed kettle hole pond in Milton, Massachusetts, south of Boston. Like many ponds and lakes in the United States, it was formed by receding glaciers about 10,000 years ago. By the standard definition of lakes being bodies of water larger than 20 acres (8.1 ha), the 24-acre (9.7 ha) pond is technically a lake.

The pond is located within the Blue Hills Reservation and managed by the Massachusetts Department of Conservation and Recreation. The Massachusett tribe once fished the pond and hunted in the woodlands that surround it. The local indian tribe called it Hoosic-Whisick, but around 1690, a British settler named Ralph Houghton bought 360 acres of forest and land (including the pond) to farm. He used the pond as a source of ice, drinking water and fish. His 1690 farmhouse was demolished in 1894 during the development of the Blue Hills Reservation and once stood where the refreshment stand now stands.

The area is a popular destination for Massachusetts residents in all seasons. Near the city limits of Boston, the setting offers people the chance to quickly immerse themselves in a natural surrounding. The pond offers a visitor center, an exhibit of Civilian Conservation Corps (CCC) memorabilia, supervised swimming area, stocked fishing, picnic areas, and various outdoor sports. The refreshment stand is on the National Register of Historic Places. The pond is surrounded by an array of hiking trails within the Blue Hills Reservation. The area is most popular in the summer for swimming and cook-outs.

== Gallery ==
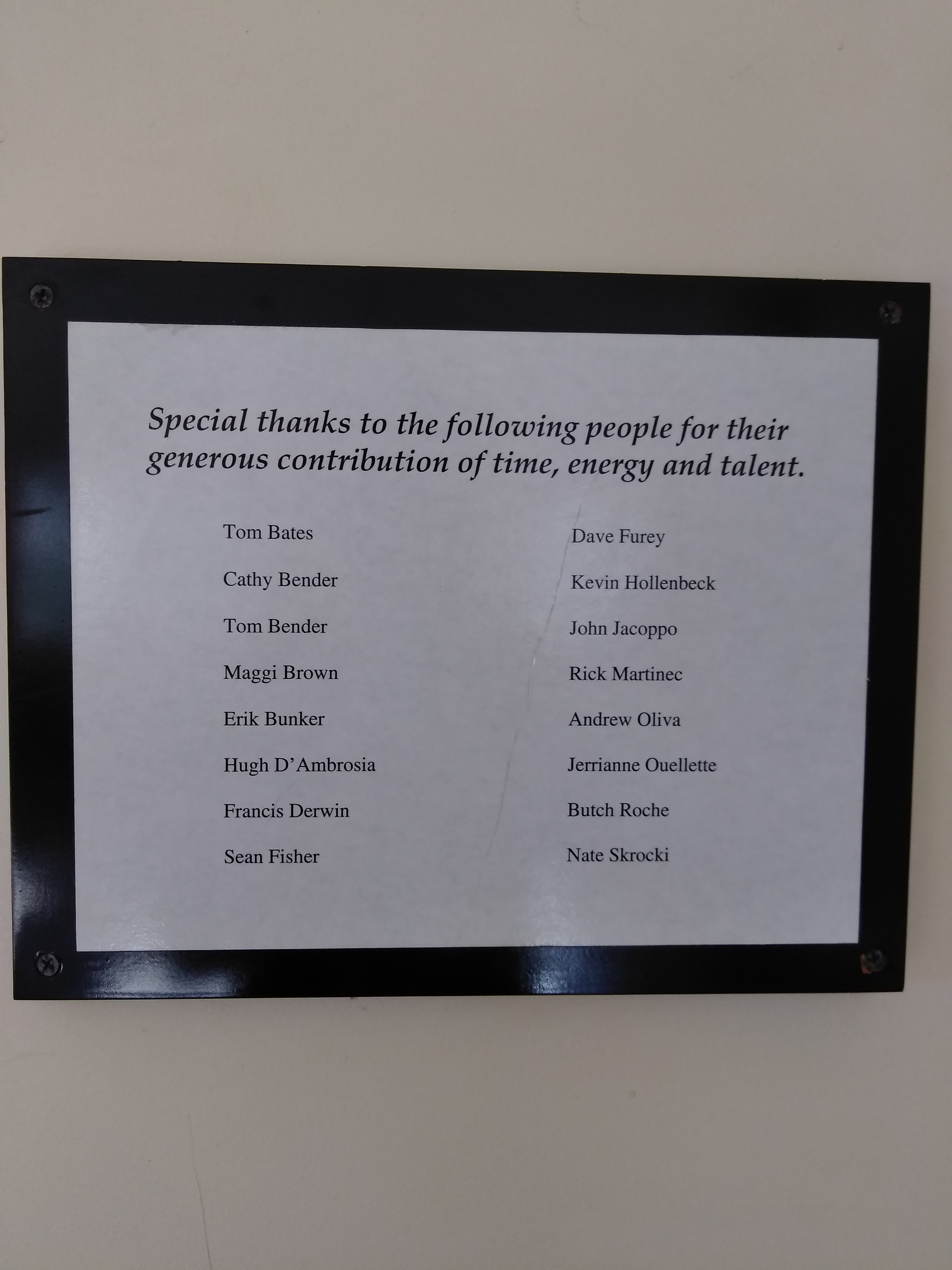
A plaque thanking those who contributed to the visitor center exhibit.

== See also ==
- Blue Hills Reservation
- Civilian Conservation Corps (CCC)
- List of beaches in New England
