= Blue Hills State Police Barracks Station H-7 =

- Blue Hills Headquarters
- U.S. National Register of Historic Places
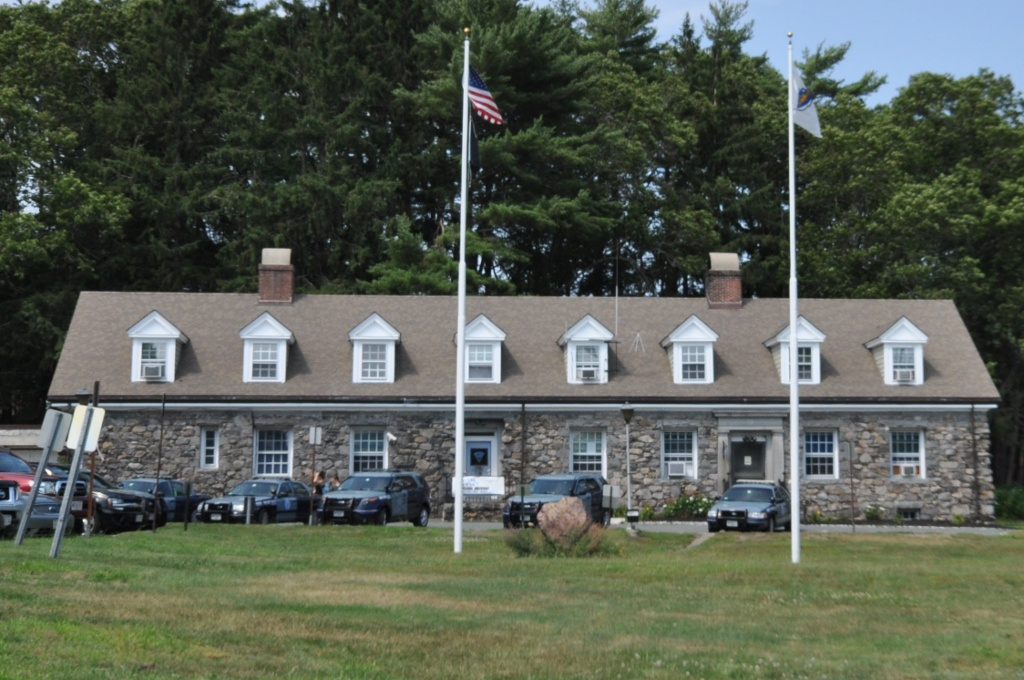

- Location within Massachusetts Location within the United States
- Location: Hillside St., Milton, Massachusetts
- Coordinates: 42.214826°N 71.09312°W
- Area: less than one acre
- Built: 1904
- Architect: Stickney & Austin
- Architectural style: Neo-Classical
- MPS: Blue Hills and Neponset River Reservations MRA
- NRHP reference No.: 80000654
- Added to NRHP: September 25, 1980

The Blue Hills State Police Barracks is on Hillside Street in Milton, Massachusetts. It houses the police and patrol offices of the Blue Hills Reservation, a Massachusetts state park administered by the Massachusetts Department of Conservation and Recreation (DCR). Built in 1904 by the DCR predecessor Metropolitan Parks Commission, it is one of several buildings designed by Stickney & Austin as the demand for services in the park increased in the early 20th century. The building was listed on the National Register of Historic Places as the Blue Hills Headquarters on September 25, 1980.

== Description and history ==
The police barracks stand among a cluster of four buildings making up the headquarters area of the Blue Hills Reservation on the northwest side of Hillside Street in southern Milton. It is a long 1 1/2-story Cape-style structure built out of Quincy granite and covered by a gabled roof. The long axis of the building is oriented perpendicular to the street, with the building facing toward the Metropolitan District Commission Stable, another Stickney & Austin design. It is eight bays across and three deep, and its roof line is pierced by eight evenly spaced gable dormers and two chimneys.

The Metropolitan Parks Commission (MPC) was established in the late 19th century to manage and develop public parklands in the Greater Boston area. The Blue Hills Reservation was one of its largest properties, and it became a popular destination for passive and active recreation. In order to properly manage the reservation, the MPC (which was later renamed the Metropolitan District Commission or MDC) commissioned Stickney & Austin, prominent Boston architects, to design the main elements of its headquarters complex. These included the stable and the superintendent's house, as well as the present building, which housed its constabulary headquarters. The building has always served as a police facility, housing MPC/MDC police before the agency was consolidated into the Massachusetts State Police in 1992.

== See also ==
- National Register of Historic Places listings in Milton, Massachusetts
