= Neponset =

Neponset may refer to:

- Neponset, Illinois
- Neponset, California
- Neponset, Boston, a district in the southeast corner of Dorchester, Boston, Massachusetts
- The Neponset River in eastern Massachusetts
- The Neponset River Reservation, a state park in Boston, along the Neponset River
- The Neponset Native American tribe of eastern Massachusetts

== See also ==
- Neponsit, a neighborhood on the Rockaway peninsula of Queens, New York
