= Truman Parkway =

Historic parkway in Massachusetts

- Truman Parkway-Metropolitan Park System of Greater Boston
- U.S. National Register of Historic Places
- U.S. Historic district
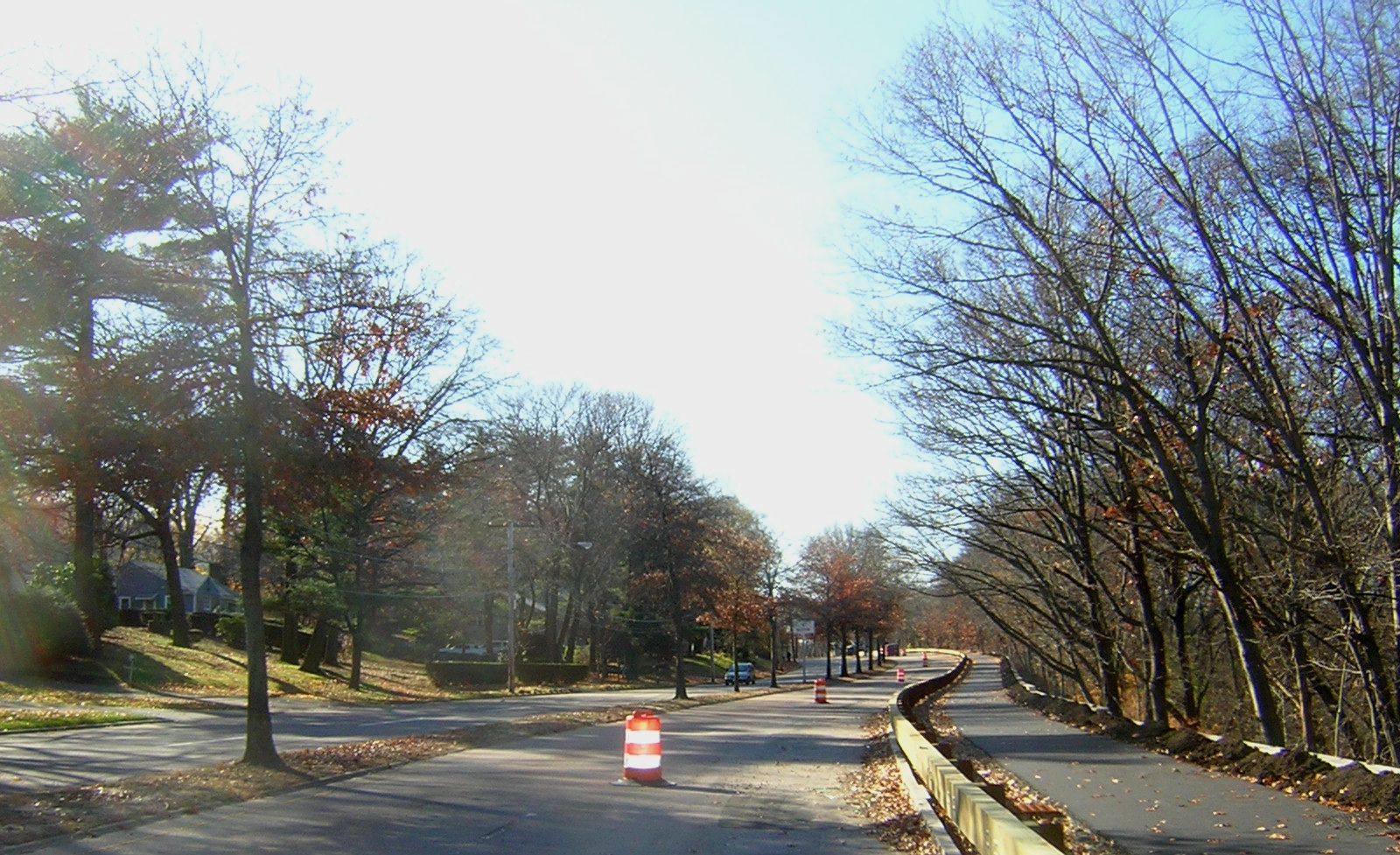
- Milton in the foreground, with Hyde Park down the road

- Location within Massachusetts Location within the United States
- Location: Truman Parkway, Boston and Milton, Massachusetts
- Coordinates: 42°15′29.8″N 71°6′43.7″W
- Area: 8 acres (3.2 ha)
- Built: 1931
- Architect: Massachusetts Dept. of Public Works
- MPS: Metropolitan Park System of Greater Boston MPS
- NRHP reference No.: 04001430
- Added to NRHP: January 5, 2005

The Truman Parkway is a historic parkway in Milton and southern Boston, Massachusetts. It runs along the southern boundary of a portion of the Neponset River Reservation and serves as a connection between the Neponset Valley Parkway and the Blue Hills Parkway. The parkway was built in 1931 and added to the National Register of Historic Places in 2005.

== Description ==
The northern terminus of the parkway is at a junction with Brush Hill Road in Milton, about 1/2 mile (0.80 km) south of its junction with Routes 28 and 138. The parkway, a four-lane road, with two lanes in each direction, with a grassy center median strip, then winds southward, roughly following the contours of the Neponset River on the southern edge of the Neponset River Reservation. It has a major junction with Beacon Street and Fairmount Avenue, the latter of which crosses the river into Boston. There is a small local commercial area at this intersection. It then passes through a section with houses lining both sides, until Dana Avenue, at which point a railroad right-of-way to its north separates it from the river. The railroad soon crosses the river, which turns south, and the parkway passes between a section of the Neponset River Reservation and a municipal playground before itself crossing the river into Boston and reaching its southern terminus at the Neponset Valley Parkway.

== History ==
Unlike other Boston-area parkways, the Truman Parkway was constructed by the Massachusetts Department of Public Works, and not the Metropolitan District Commission (MDC) or its predecessors. It was built in 1931, to standards similar to those used by the MDC for its parkways, and acquired by the MDC in 1956.

== See also ==
- National Register of Historic Places listings in Milton, Massachusetts
- National Register of Historic Places listings in southern Boston, Massachusetts
