= Paul's Bridge =

Bridge in Massachusetts, US

- U.S. National Register of Historic Places
- U.S. Historic district – Contributing property
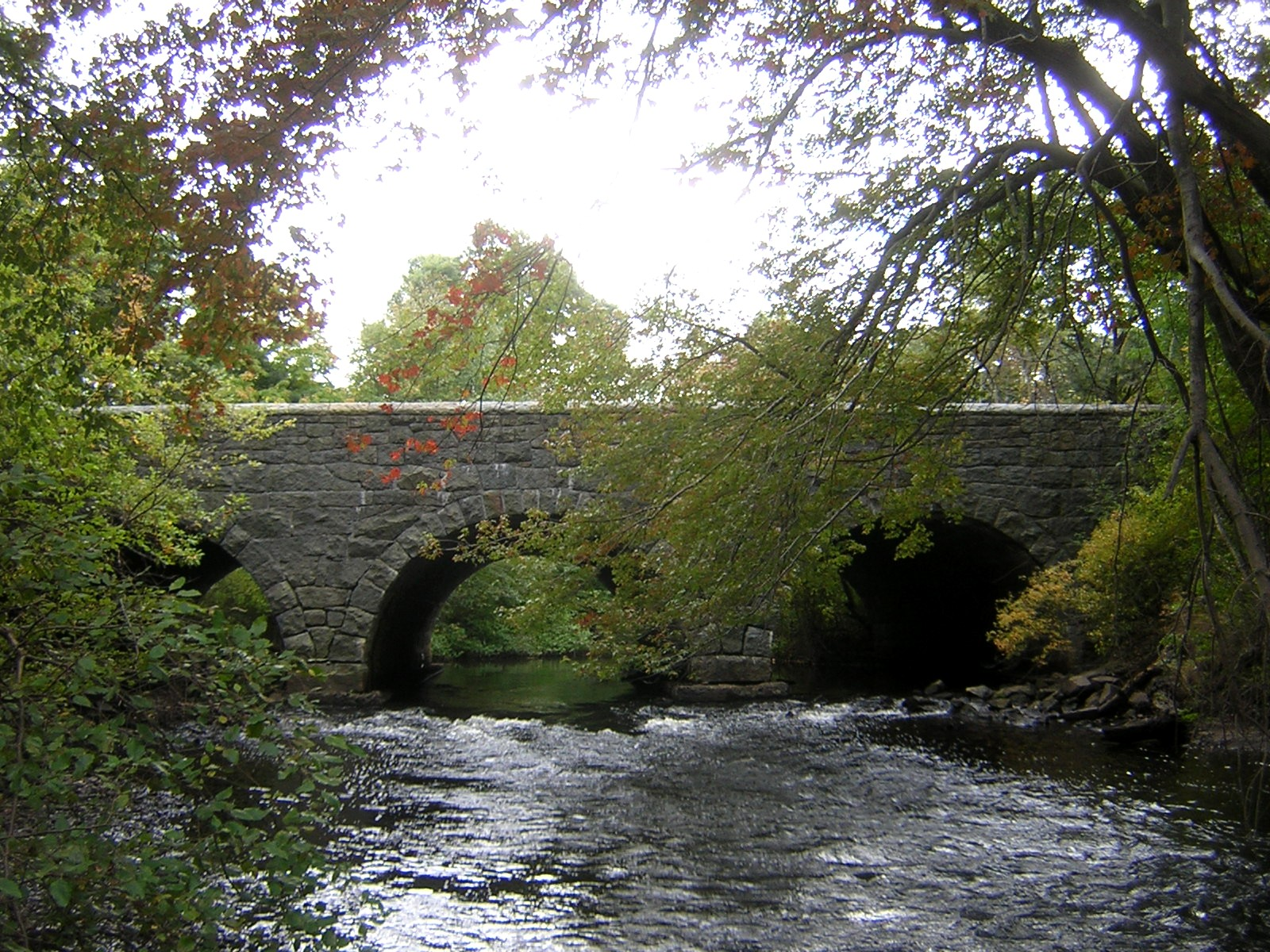
- North side

- Location within Massachusetts Location within the United States
- Location: Milton and Boston, Massachusetts
- Coordinates: 42°14′4″N 71°7′21″W
- Area: less than one acre
- Built: 1849
- Part of: Neponset Valley Parkway (ID04001573)
- NRHP reference No.: 72000140

Significant dates
- Added to NRHP: December 11, 1972
- Designated CP: January 24, 2005

Paul's Bridge is a stone bridge carrying the Neponset Valley Parkway over the Neponset River between Milton and southern Boston, Massachusetts. It was built in 1849 by Thomas Hollis, Jr., of Milton, but was later reconstructed using the original materials. It replaced the earlier Hubbard's Bridge (built prior to 1759), and a subsequent Paul's Bridge (so named at its 1807 reconstruction). Its current span is approximately 88 feet (27 m). The name "Paul" can be attributed to Samuel Paul, the owner of the adjacent land on the Readville (now Boston) side, which was part of Dedham at the time of the bridge's construction.

The 1849 bridge was 81 feet (25 m) long and 22 feet (6.7 m) wide, and was constructed of unmortared Quincy granite. Each round arch measures 20 feet (6.1 m) at the springline. The area between the arches is uncoursed rubblestone, and the arches are formed out of cut granite voussoirs. The bridge underwent a major rebuilding between 1932 and 1935 under the leadership of Arthur A. Shurcliff, FASLA and founder of the AIP, who made it a priority to widen the bridge. Most of the original stone was reused and solid stone parapets replaced the wooden side rails. Instead of a rubblestone finish between the arches on the extended side, it is finished in coursed stone.

Paul's Bridge was added to the National Register of Historic Places in 1972, and contributes to a historic district encompassing the Neponset River Parkway. It is located within the Neponset River Reservation, and is maintained by the Massachusetts Department of Conservation and Recreation.

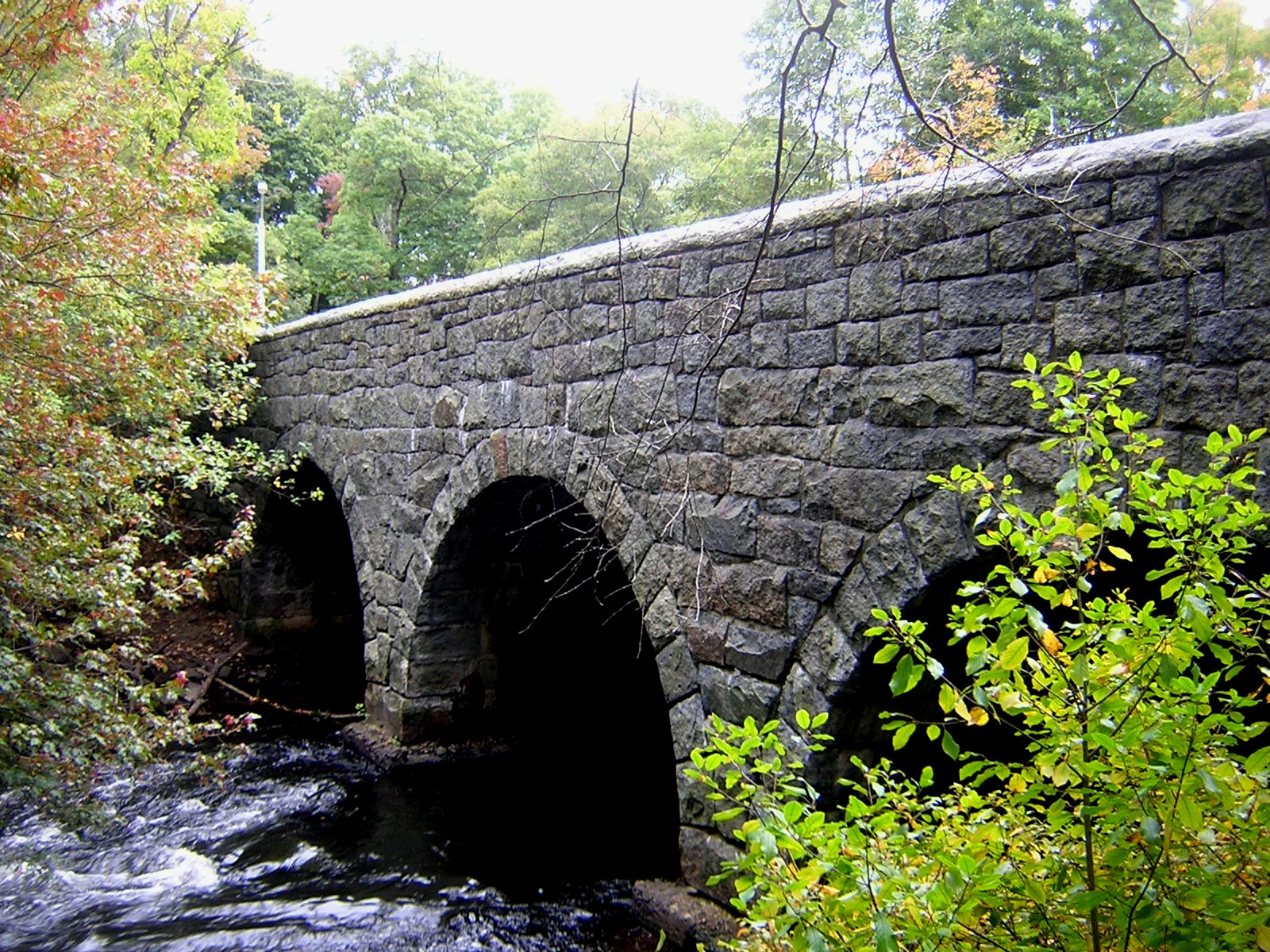
North side

== See also ==
- National Register of Historic Places listings in Milton, Massachusetts
- National Register of Historic Places listings in southern Boston, Massachusetts
- List of bridges on the National Register of Historic Places in Massachusetts
