= National Register of Historic Places listings in Milton, Massachusetts =

This is a list of properties and historic districts in Milton, Massachusetts, that are listed on the National Register of Historic Places.

The locations of National Register properties and districts (at least for all showing latitude and longitude coordinates below) may be seen in an online map by clicking on "Map of all coordinates".

This National Park Service list is complete through NPS recent listings posted July 31, 2026.

== Current listings ==
	Name on the Register	Image	Date listed	Location	City or town	Description
1	Belcher-Rowe House	Belcher-Rowe House	April 1, 1982 (#82002748)	26 Governor Belcher Lane; 42°15′34″N 71°02′58″W		
2	G.H. Bent Company Factory	G.H. Bent Company Factory	February 10, 2000 (#00000075)	7 Pleasant St. 42°14′42″N 71°04′10″W		
3	Blue Hills Headquarters	Blue Hills Headquarters	September 25, 1980 (#80000654)	Hillside St. 42°12′53″N 71°05′35″W		
4	Blue Hills Reservation Parkways-Metropolitan Park System of Greater Boston	Blue Hills Reservation Parkways-Metropolitan Park System of Greater Boston	August 11, 2003 (#03000746)	Parts of Blue Hill Rd., Chickatawbut Rd., Hillside St., Uniquity Rd., Wampatuck Rd., and Green St. 42°13′34″N 71°04′20″W		Extends into Quincy and into Braintree and Canton, elsewhere in Norfolk County
5	Blue Hills Parkway	Blue Hills Parkway	June 23, 2003 (#03000574)	Blue Hills Parkway, Milton; 42°15′21″N 71°05′38″W		
6	Brookwood Farm	Brookwood Farm	September 25, 1980 (#80000655)	Off Hillside Street; 42°12′34″N 71°06′41″W		Extends into Canton, elsewhere in Norfolk County
7	Brush Hill Historic District	Brush Hill Historic District	August 20, 1998 (#98001081)	Roughly Brush Hill Rd., from Robbins St. to Bradlee Rd., and Dana Ave., Brush Hill Ln. and Fairmount Ave. 42°14′45″N 71°06′35″W		
8	Comfort Station	Comfort Station	September 25, 1980 (#80000658)	Blue Hill Ave. 42°13′09″N 71°07′06″W		
9	Davenport Estate Historic District	Davenport Estate Historic District	May 17, 2018 (#100002421)	1465, 1485, 1493 Brush Hill Rd. 42°13′25″N 71°07′07″W		Now also known as the Wakefield Estate.
10	Dorchester-Milton Lower Mills Industrial District	Dorchester-Milton Lower Mills Industrial District	April 2, 1980 (#80000675)	Both sides of the Neponset River; also Adams, River, and Medway Sts., Millers Lane, and Eliot and Adams Sts. 42°16′16″N 71°04′08″W		Extends into Boston in Suffolk County; Second set of addresses represents a boundary increase
11	Eliot Memorial Bridge	Eliot Memorial Bridge	September 25, 1980 (#80000662)	Milton; 42°12′42″N 71°06′49″W		
12	Eustis Estate Historic District	Eustis Estate Historic District	March 22, 2016 (#16000099)	1400, 1421, 1424, 1426 and 1452 Canton Ave. 42°13′54″N 71°06′27″W		
13	Capt. Robert B. Forbes House	Capt. Robert B. Forbes House	November 13, 1966 (#66000651)	215 Adams St. 42°15′47″N 71°03′49″W		National Historic Landmark
14	Great Blue Hill Observation Tower	Great Blue Hill Observation Tower	September 25, 1980 (#80000661)	Milton; 42°12′43″N 71°06′49″W		
15	Great Blue Hill Weather Observatory	Great Blue Hill Weather Observatory	September 25, 1980 (#80000665)	Milton; 42°12′42″N 71°06′55″W		A National Historic Landmark as "Blue Hill Meteorological Observatory"
16	Dr. Amos Holbrook House	Dr. Amos Holbrook House	February 13, 1975 (#75000289)	203 Adams St. 42°15′55″N 71°03′59″W		
17	Gov. Thomas Hutchinson's Ha-ha	Gov. Thomas Hutchinson's Ha-ha	February 13, 1975 (#75000290)	100 and 122 Randolph Ave. 42°15′55″N 71°04′06″W		
18	Massachusetts Hornfels-Braintree Slate Quarry	Massachusetts Hornfels-Braintree Slate Quarry	September 25, 1980 (#80000653)	Address Restricted		Extends into Quincy.
19	Metropolitan District Commission Stable	Metropolitan District Commission Stable	September 25, 1980 (#80000663)	Hillside St. 42°12′56″N 71°05′33″W		
20	Milton Cemetery	Milton Cemetery	June 2, 2004 (#04000537)	211 Centre St. 42°15′24″N 71°03′55″W		
21	Milton Centre Historic District	Milton Centre Historic District	April 28, 1988 (#88000428)	Canton Ave. between Reedsdale Rd. and Thacher and Highland Sts. 42°15′12″N 71°04′47″W		
22	Milton Hill Historic District	Milton Hill Historic District	June 9, 1995 (#95000698)	Roughly bounded by Adams and School Sts., Randolph and Canton Aves., and Brook Rd. 42°15′52″N 71°03′59″W		
23	Neponset Valley Parkway, Metropolitan Park System of Greater Boston	Neponset Valley Parkway, Metropolitan Park System of Greater Boston	January 24, 2005 (#04001573)	Neponset Valley Parkway; 42°14′05″N 71°07′26″W		Extends into Boston in Suffolk County
24	Paul's Bridge	Paul's Bridge	December 11, 1972 (#72000140)	Neponset Valley Parkway over the Neponset River; 42°14′04″N 71°07′21″W		Extends into Boston in Suffolk County
25	Railway Village Historic District	Railway Village Historic District	March 6, 2000 (#00000111)	Roughly along Adams St., from Mechanic and Church Sts., and Washington St. 42°15′27″N 71°02′14″W		
26	Refreshment Pavilion	Refreshment Pavilion	September 25, 1980 (#80000659)	Hillside St. 42°12′31″N 71°05′52″W		
27	Scott's Woods Historic District	Scott's Woods Historic District	November 5, 1992 (#92001528)	Hillside St. between Randolph Ave. and MDC Blue Hills Reservation; 42°13′27″N 71°04′50″W		
28	Suffolk Resolves House	Suffolk Resolves House	July 23, 1973 (#73000308)	1370 Canton Ave. 42°14′03″N 71°06′32″W		
29	Truman Parkway-Metropolitan Park System of Greater Boston	Truman Parkway-Metropolitan Park System of Greater Boston	January 5, 2005 (#04001430)	Truman Parkway; 42°14′53″N 71°06′59″W		Extends into Boston in Suffolk County
30	US Post Office-Milton Main	US Post Office-Milton Main	May 30, 1986 (#86001213)	499 Adams St. 42°15′30″N 71°02′34″W		

== See also ==
- National Register of Historic Places listings in Norfolk County, Massachusetts
- List of National Historic Landmarks in Massachusetts
