= Neponset Valley Parkway =

Parkway in Greater Boston, Massachusetts

- Neponset Valley Parkway, Metropolitan Park System of Greater Boston
- U.S. National Register of Historic Places
- U.S. Historic district
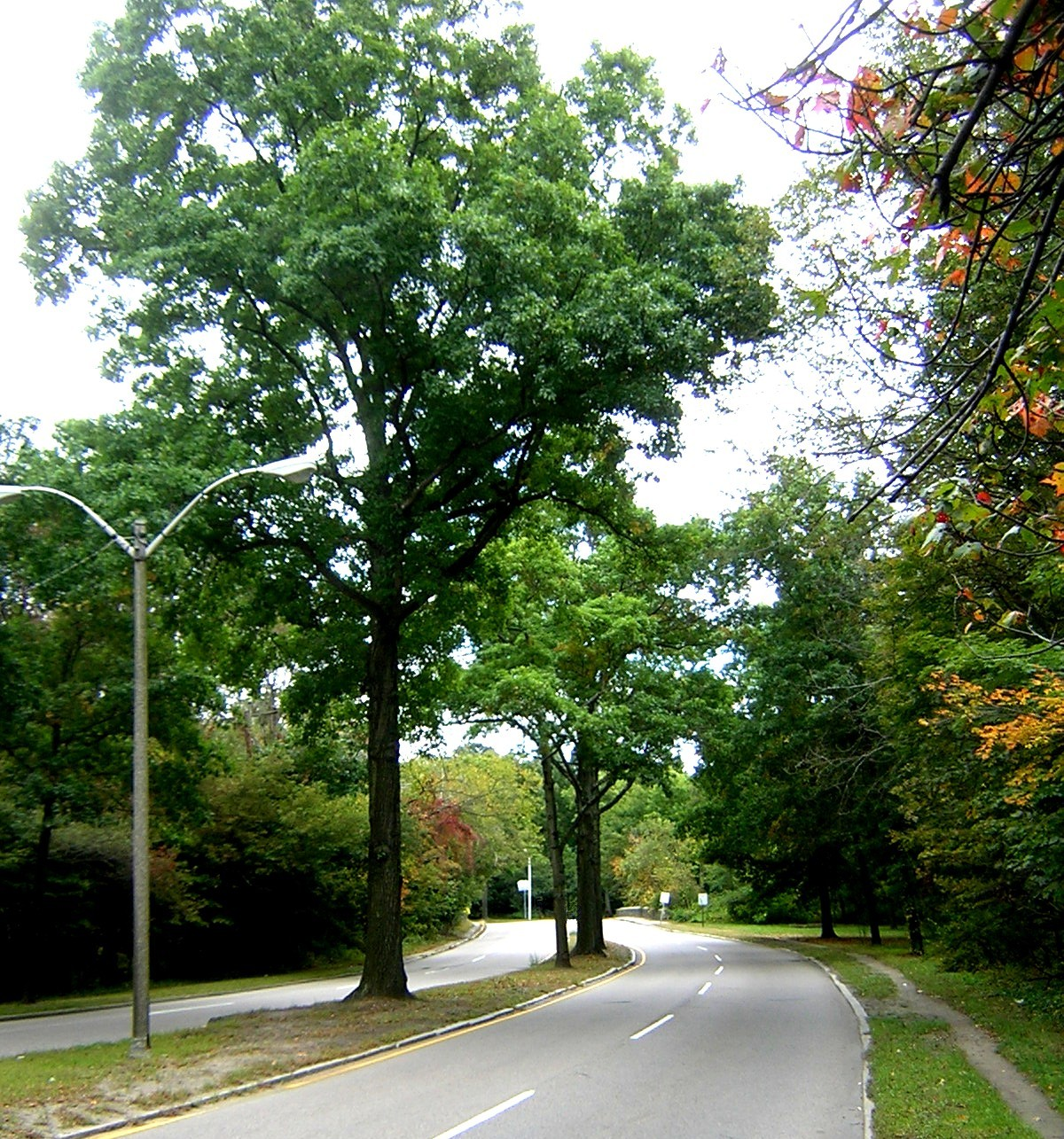
- Looking from Boston toward Paul's Bridge and Milton

- Location within Massachusetts Location within the United States
- Location: Boston and Milton, Massachusetts
- Coordinates: 42°14′5″N 71°7′26″W
- Area: 13 acres (5.3 ha)
- Built: 1898
- Architect: Charles Eliot, Olmsted Bros.
- MPS: Metropolitan Park System of Greater Boston MPS
- NRHP reference No.: 04001573
- Added to NRHP: January 24, 2005

The Neponset Valley Parkway is a historic parkway in southern Boston and Milton, Massachusetts, United States. It is a connecting parkway in the Greater Boston area's network, providing a connection between the Blue Hills Reservation, Neponset River Reservation, and the Stony Brook Reservation. The parkway was constructed between 1898 and 1929 with design assistance from Charles Eliot and the Olmsted Brothers. It was listed on the National Register of Historic Places in 2005.

== Description ==
The northern terminus of the parkway is at a junction with River Street, north of the Readville neighborhood of Boston and just south of the Mill Pond Reservation, a city park. On the far side of the Mill Pond Reservation is the southern end of Turtle Pond Parkway, one of the Stony Brook Reservation Parkways. It runs roughly east, as a two-lane road, until it meets a major railroad right-of-way, at which point it turns south. It makes a left turn to cross the railroad with Milton Street on the John Hart Bridge (a 1930s WPA construction), just north of the Readville MBTA station. It turns south, passing the station and then curves east again, crossing another branch of the railroad to enter Wolcott Square, a commercial area of Readville. From Wolcott Square it proceeds roughly southeast in a straight line, through a residential area, and widens to four lanes shortly before reaching the edge of the Neponset River Reservation and a junction with the southern terminus of the Truman Parkway. It then crosses the Neponset River into Milton on Paul's Bridge, an 1849 stone arch bridge which was rebuilt to widen it as part of the parkway construction. On the east side of the river it meets Milton Street and Brush Hill Road, briefly turning southwest before resuming its southeasterly course to its southern terminus at Blue Hill Avenue (Massachusetts Route 138).

== History ==
The parkway was built in three stages, and was one of the Metropolitan District Commission's (MDC) early connecting parkways. The segment between Wolcott Square and Brush Hill Road was acquired first, as an existing municipal street formerly called Neponset Street. This section was acquired by the MDC's predecessor in 1898 and upgraded to its parkway standards; Paul's Bridge was rebuilt in 1932–33. The section north of this was originally planned to be a new roadway (and land was even acquired in 1901), but the MDC decided in 1924 to instead acquire the present alignment, which was then called Regent Street. The John Hart Bridge was acquired by the MDC in 1956, replacing an earlier grade crossing. The southern segment of the parkway was built as a new roadway in 1904.

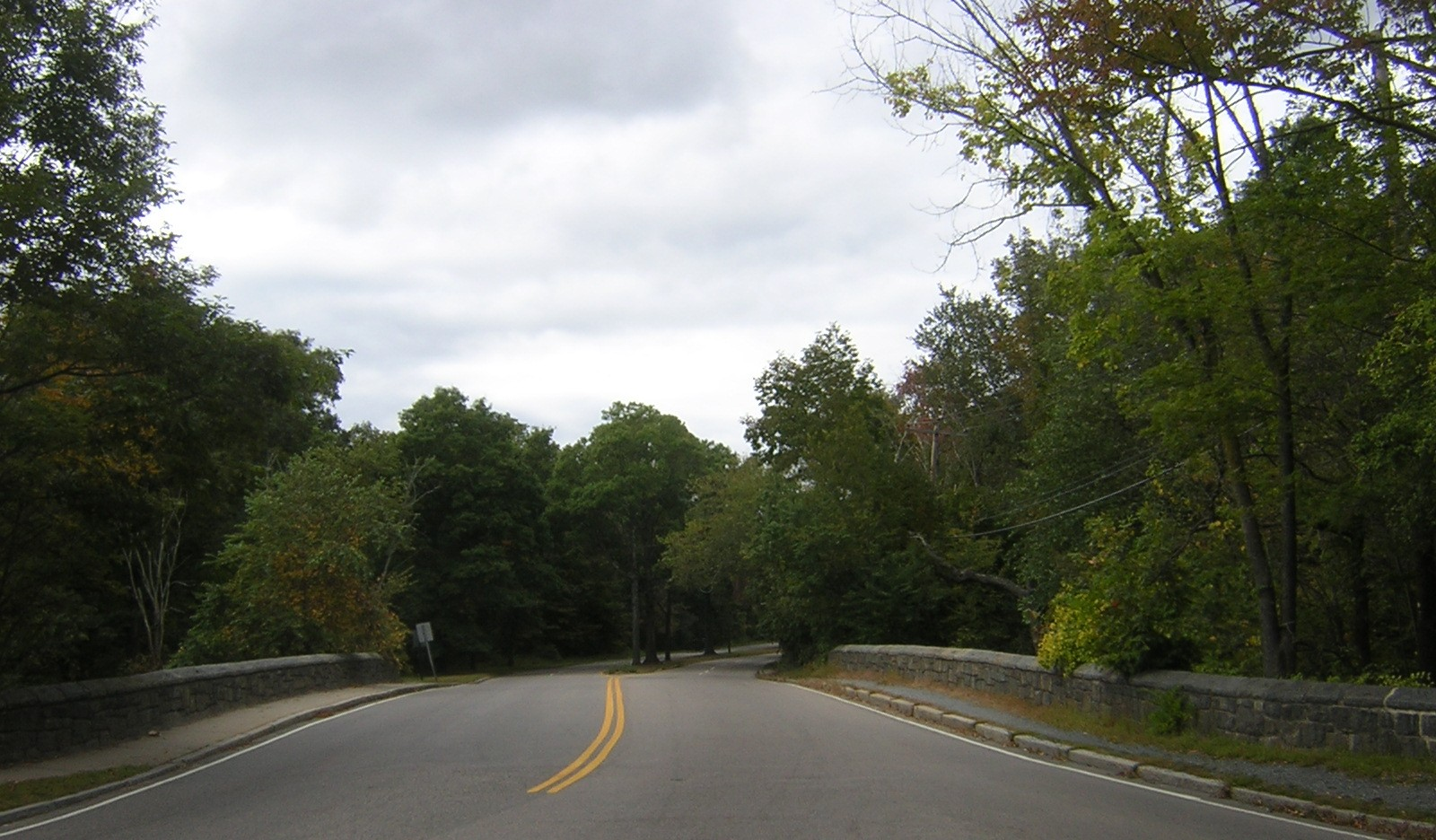
Looking over Paul's Bridge from Milton into Boston.

== See also ==
- National Register of Historic Places listings in Milton, Massachusetts
- National Register of Historic Places listings in southern Boston, Massachusetts
