= Scott's Woods Historic District =

Historic district in Massachusetts, United States

- U.S. National Register of Historic Places
- U.S. Historic district
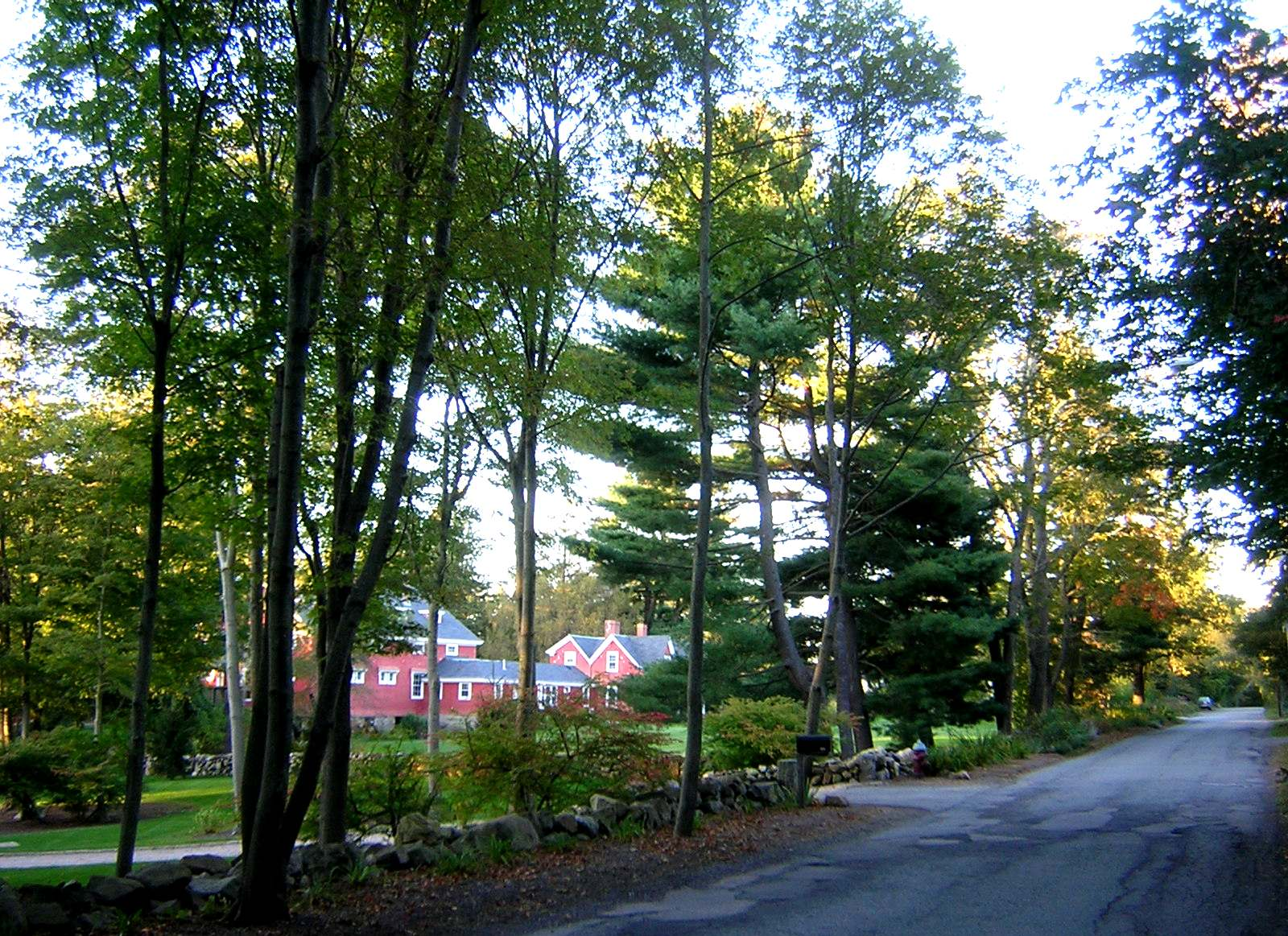

- Location within Massachusetts Location within the United States
- Location: Hillside St. between Randolph Ave. and Blue Hills Reservation, Milton, Massachusetts
- Coordinates: 42°13′27″N 71°4′50″W
- Area: 122.6 acres (49.6 ha)
- Architect: Hogg, Frank Trevor; Et al.
- Architectural style: Mid 19th Century Revival, Late 19th And 20th Century Revivals, Late Victorian
- NRHP reference No.: 92001528
- Added to NRHP: November 05, 1992

The Scott's Woods Historic District is a historic district on Hillside Street between Randolph Avenue and the Blue Hills Reservation in Milton, Massachusetts. This rural-residential area has a long history, and is named for the Scott family, who were early settlers of the area. This area preserves a concentration of agricultural and residential resources dating from the 18th to the early 20th centuries, with well-preserved houses, barns, and landscapes. The district was listed on the National Register of Historic Places in 1992.

== Description and history ==
The Scott's Wood area is located in southernmost central Milton, extending along Hillside Street roughly between Randolph Avenue (Massachusetts Route 28) and the border of the Blue Hills Reservation. The district covers about 122 acres (49 ha) of hilly terrain below the heights of the Blue Hills. The oldest house in the district, the First Period Bernard Capen House, was moved here in 1909 from Dorchester, which Milton was originally part of. Two houses built in the district in the mid-18th century survive, as do a number of 19th-century barns with relatively little modification.

The area was annexed to Milton in 1712, having originally been land owned by Boston that was supposedly settled by an otherwise undocumented Scott family. The oldest surviving house to be built in the district is that of Samuel Tucker, son of Manasseh Tucker who was an investor in the Boston property. That house, and that of Stephen Miller, son of another investor, set the pattern for rural agricultural development in the area that survived into the mid-19th century. In the late 19th century the farm properties became increasing subdivided, and eventually many were transformed into small country estates. After the First World War, the country estates began to be divided for purely residential development.

== See also ==
- National Register of Historic Places listings in Milton, Massachusetts
