= Massachusetts Hornfels-Braintree Slate Quarry =

- U.S. National Register of Historic Places
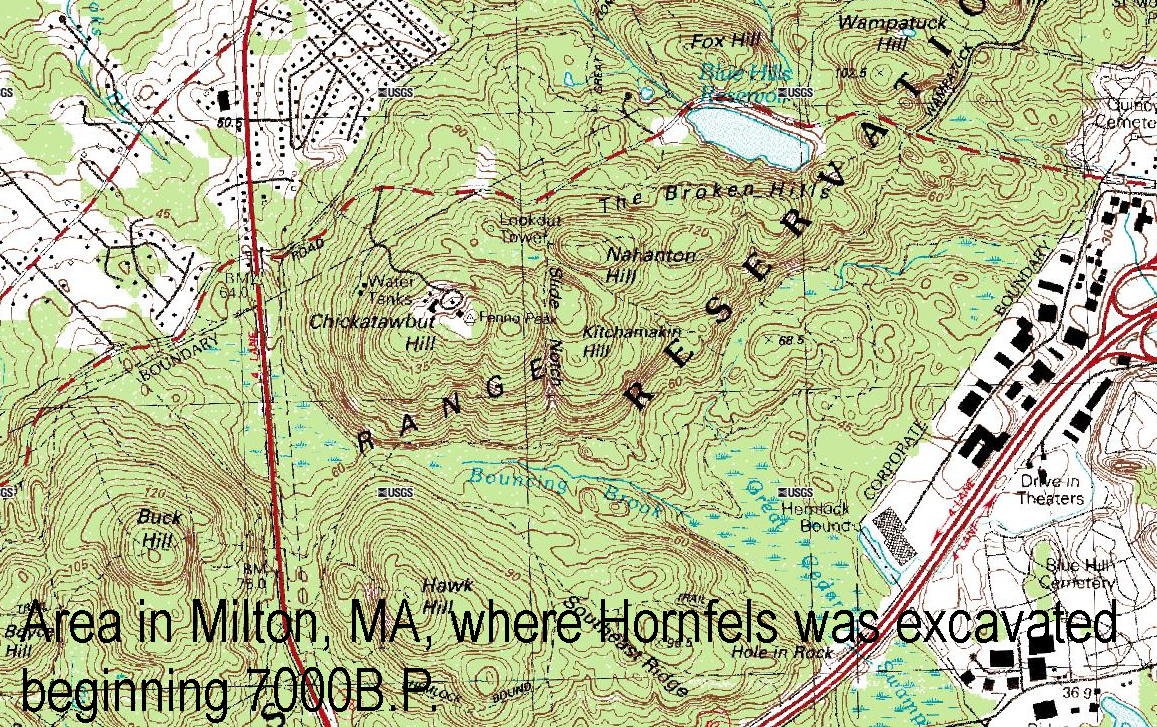
- Hornfels
- Nearest city: Milton, Massachusetts
- Area: 63 acres (25 ha)
- Built: 1825
- MPS: Blue Hills and Neponset River Reservations MRA
- NRHP reference No.: 80000653
- Added to NRHP: September 25, 1980

The Massachusetts Hornfels-Braintree Slate Quarry is a prehistoric archaeological site in Milton and Quincy, Massachusetts. It consists of a series of pits and trenches used from 5,000 B.C. until the early 17th century as a source of slate and hornfels used for chipped and ground tools. Pieces made from material quarried at the site are found over much of eastern Massachusetts. The site was added to the National Register of Historic Places in 1980.

== Description ==
The Hornfels Quarry was discovered in 1974 by amateur archaeologists seeking the source for stone tools that had been found in some abundance at a variety of prehistoric archaeological sites in eastern Massachusetts. The stone materials in question were originally thought to be of volcanic origin (based on basaltic sources). A site on a nearby river with a large quantity of this particular type of stone convinced researchers the source had to be nearby. The quarry was located while searching for prehistoric sites near a golf course construction project to the north of the Blue Hills Reservation.

The stone found at the quarry is not basaltic in origin, but a heavily metamorphized sedimentary slate known as hornfels, that has a significant amount of silica. This stone had the property of being extremely hard, a desirable property for the Native Americans seeking to produce tools. Finds at the site include diabase stone disks, used either as preforms from which edged tools were manufactured, or in the quarrying operations to extract more usable stone. Materials from these quarries have been found as far away as Rhode Island.

== See also ==
- National Register of Historic Places listings in Milton, Massachusetts
