= Brush Hill Historic District =

Historic district in Massachusetts, United States

- U.S. National Register of Historic Places
- U.S. Historic district
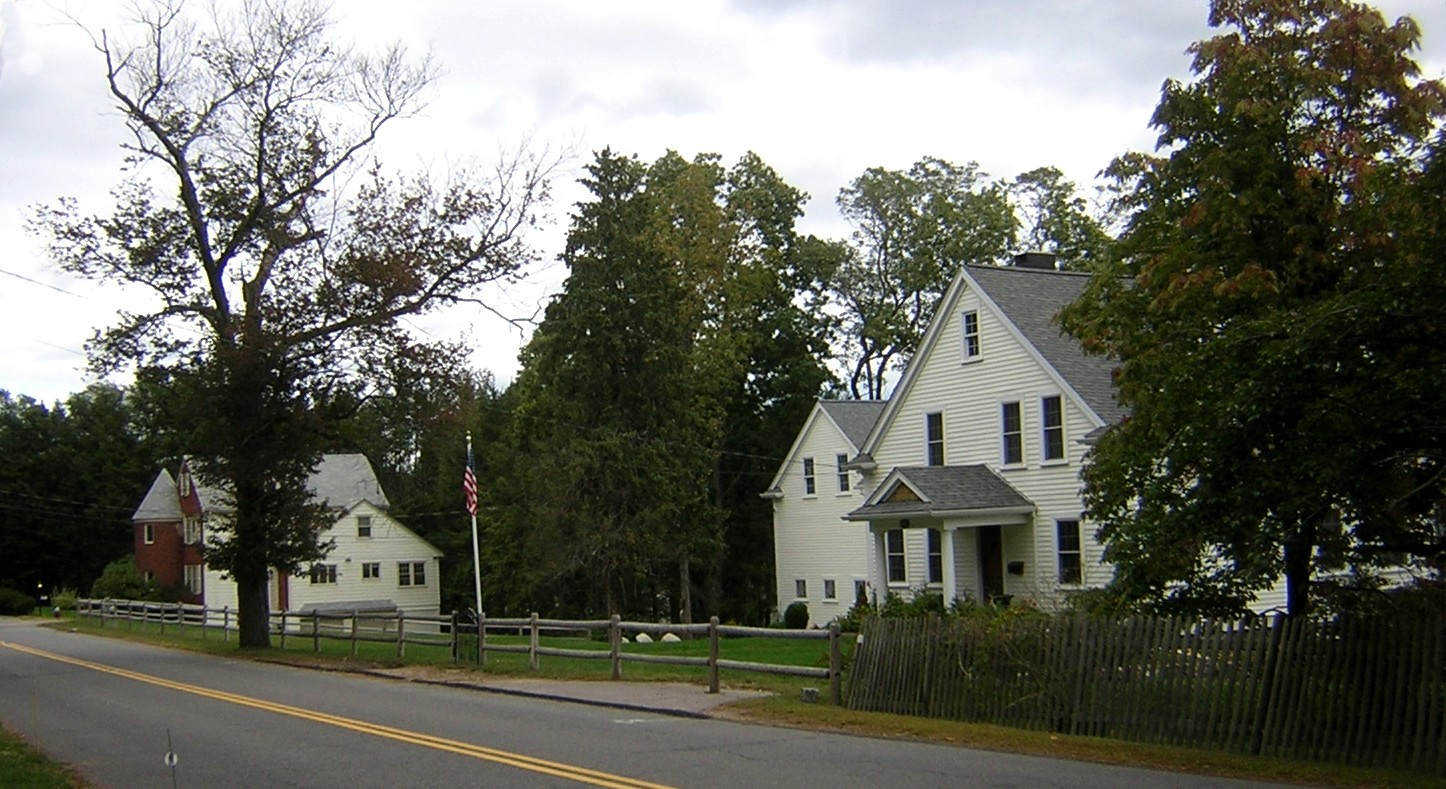

- Location within Massachusetts Location within the United States
- Location: Milton, Massachusetts
- Coordinates: 42°14′45″N 71°6′35″W
- Area: 68.5 acres (27.7 ha)
- Architect: multiple
- Architectural style: Colonial, Federal, Greek Revival
- NRHP reference No.: 98001081
- Added to NRHP: August 20, 1998

The Brush Hill Historic District is a residential historic district along Brush Hill Road in Milton, Massachusetts. First developed in the 1660s, the district now encompasses a diversity of rural-suburban residential architecture from the late-17th to mid-29th centuries, encapsulating the development of the town's predominantly residential character. The district was listed on the National Register of Historic Places in 1998.

== Description and history ==
Brush Hill Road is one of Milton's oldest roads, probably beginning as a Native American path prior to the arrival of English colonists. It extends across the top of Brush Hill a low rise of land between the larger Blue Hills to the south and the Neponset River to the north. Milton was a part of Dorchester until 1662, and the Brush Hill area was one of the last areas to be allocated by the early colonists, in 1660. The area remained generally agrarian, while other parts of Milton began to develop a more suburban residential character in the 19th century. The arrival of improved transportation beginning in the mid 19th century brought the development of summer estates in the Brush Hill area, and the subdivision of properties closer to the Neponset River for residential development. In the late 19th and early 20th centuries, many of the farm and estate properties were further subdivided, creating the suburban residential character seen today.

The historic district extends on the north side of Brush Hill Road from Dana Avenue to Brush Hill Lane, and on the south side from Bradlee Road to Robbins Street. The district includes a representative cross-section of residential development from c. 1670 to the late 1940s, and includes Milton's oldest house, the Robert Tucker House, at 678 Brush Hill Road.

== See also ==
- National Register of Historic Places listings in Milton, Massachusetts
