= Railway Village Historic District =

Historic district in Massachusetts, United States

- U.S. National Register of Historic Places
- U.S. Historic district
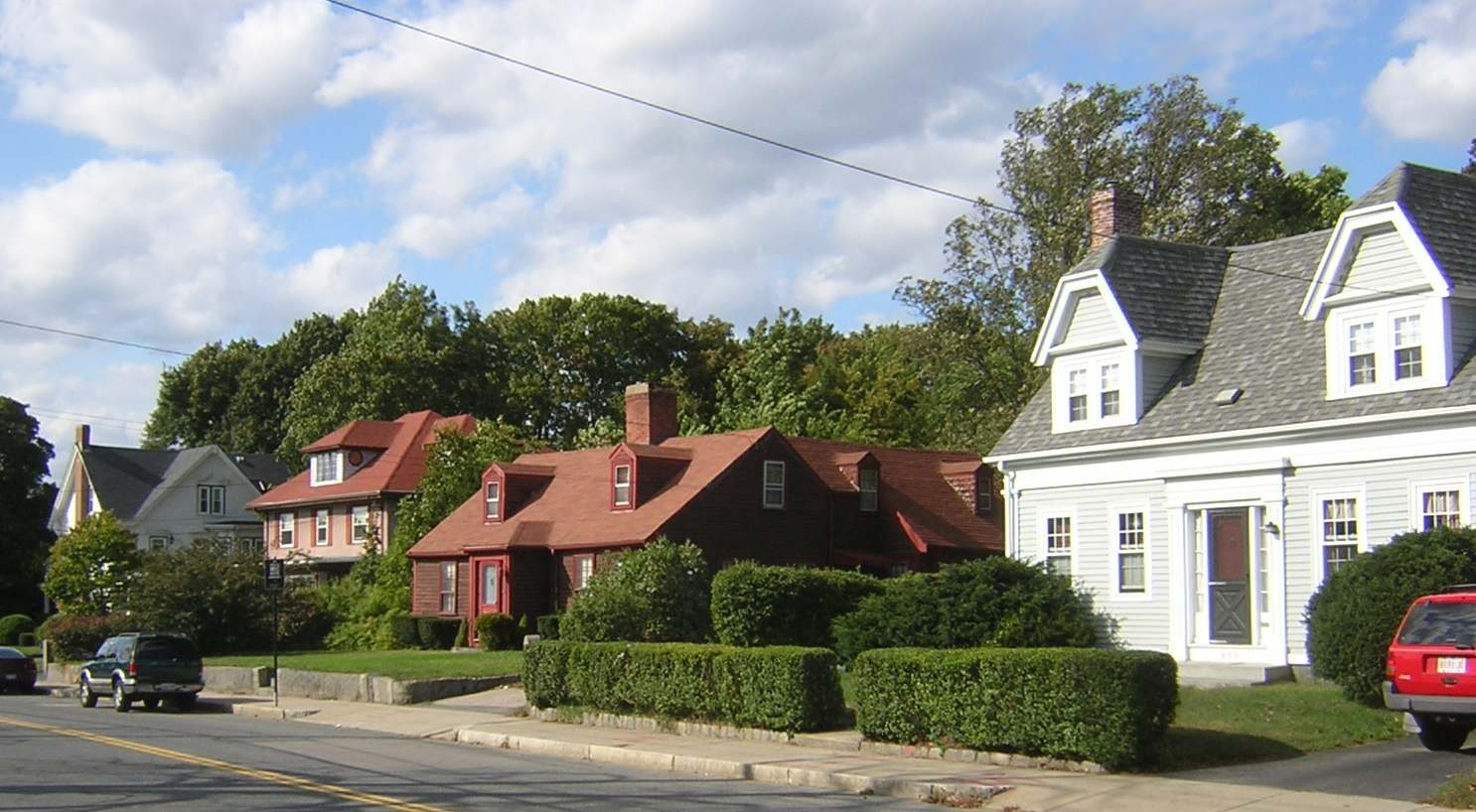

- Location within Massachusetts Location within the United States
- Location: Roughly along Adams St., from Mechanic and Church Sts., and Washington St., Milton, Massachusetts
- Coordinates: 42°16′1″N 71°2′12″W
- Area: 30 acres (12 ha)
- Architect: Arland A. Dirlam; et al.
- Architectural style: Colonial, Greek Revival, et al.
- NRHP reference No.: 00000111
- Added to NRHP: March 06, 2000

The Railway Village Historic District is a historic district encompassing a densely populated, predominantly residential, area of eastern Milton, Massachusetts. The 30-acre (12 ha) district lies roughly between East Milton Square and the town line with neighboring Quincy. The area's significant growth occurred after the 1826 construction of the Granite Railway, which transported stone from the nearby granite quarries to the Neponset River. This resulted in the movement to the area of stone workers and related interests. The principal thoroughfare of the district is Adams Street; the district extends along Pierce Street, Granite Place, and Washington Street, and includes properties on intervening and connecting streets.

The district was listed on the National Register of Historic Places in 2000.

== History ==
The area that is now eastern Milton was originally part of Dorchester in early colonial days, and became part of Milton when it incorporated in 1662. The area remained rural and agrarian in character until the early 19th century, with most of the land owned by Lancelot Pierce. Pierce built a house in 1748, which still stands on Adams Street, a road which began as a Native American trail. Development in the area was spurred in 1826 by the construction of the Granite Railway, which was built to transport stone from quarries in Quincy to the Neponset River for use in the Bunker Hill Monument. The railroad right-of-way was later taken over by the Old Colony Railroad, which operated service on it until 1940. These developments resulted in the growth of the village center at East Milton, and the residential area to its east that is the subject of this district. By 1870 there were more than 20 houses in the area, which rose to nearly 100 by the early 20th century. The latter growth was spurred in part by developers selling to people who were employed in downtown Boston, commuting to work on the train. The railroad line was shut down in 1940, and later parts were paved over for the Southeast Expressway.

== See also ==
- National Register of Historic Places listings in Milton, Massachusetts
