= Wakefield Estate =

- Davenport Estate Historic District
- U.S. National Register of Historic Places
- U.S. Historic district
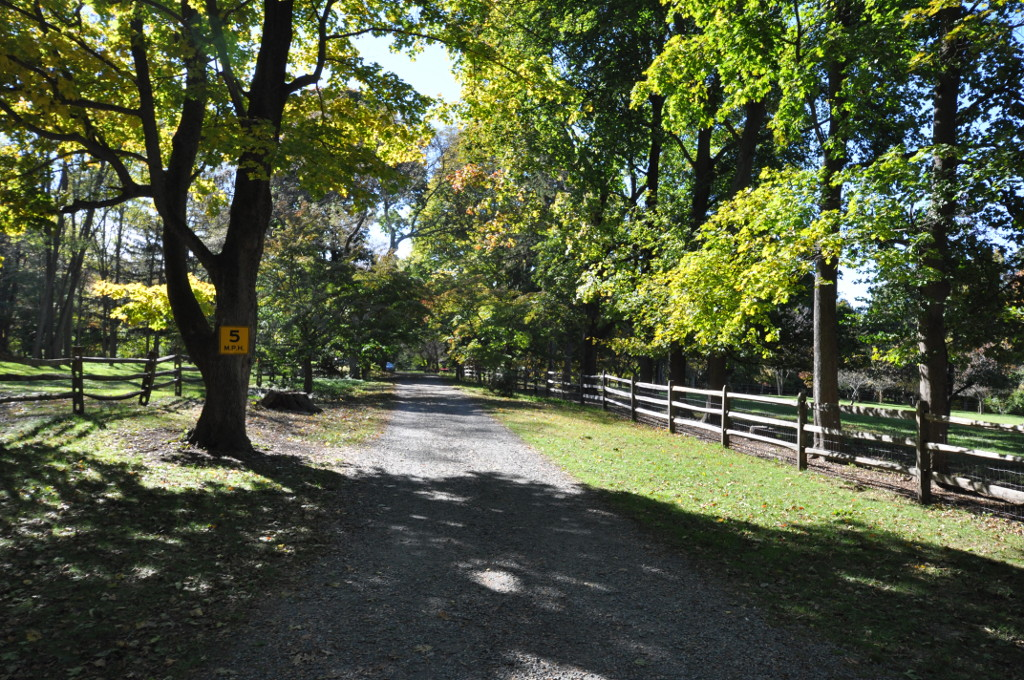

- Location within Massachusetts Location within the United States
- Location: 1465, 1485, 1493 Brush Hill Rd., Milton, Massachusetts
- Coordinates: 42°13′25″N 71°7′7″W
- Area: 22 acres (8.9 ha)
- Architect: multiple
- Architectural style: Georgian
- NRHP reference No.: 100002421
- Added to NRHP: May 17, 2018

The Wakefield Estate, formerly the Davenport Estate, is a historic country estate on Brush Hill Road in Milton, Massachusetts. The estate was owned and developed by the Davenport family for over 300 years before being taken over by its present owner, a charitable trust. The estate is managed by the Wakefield Trust as part of its educational mission, and its grounds are open to the public by appointment, or on announced occasions. It was listed on the National Register of Historic Places in 2018.

== Description and history ==
The Wakefield Estate occupies 22 acres (8.9 ha), a remnant of once-larger holdings, on the west side of Brush Hill Road just north of its intersection with Blue Hill Avenue in western Milton. The estate includes three residences and a number of outbuildings, used historically for agricultural and horticultural purposes.

The oldest house on the estate is that of John Davenport, which was probably built in the early 18th century, and retains elements of its First Period architecture. The main mansion house, built about 1794 by Isaac Davenport, has a history of substantial alteration and construction, reflective of the family's rise in economic success and adaptive use of the property.

The third house, known as Red Cottage, is a formerly agricultural building that was adapted about 1920 for residential use.

The present land of the estate is part of a large parcel of land acquired by John Davenport, who apparently moved here from neighboring Dorchester in 1707, the approximate date of construction of the first house. Davenport's grandson Samuel was a silversmith who was noted for sitting on the jury in the trials that followed the Boston Massacre.

Samuel's son Isaac was a successful merchant with offices in Boston, and his success began the transformation of the property to a country estate. The property eventually passed out of Isaac's line and into that of a cousin who was also descended from John Davenport.

Following the death of Mary "Polly" Davenport Wakefield in 1994, the property passed to a charitable trust established to preserve the property with an educational and horticultural mission. The property is known for its large number of Kousa dogwood trees, which bloom in profusion in early June.

== See also ==
- National Register of Historic Places listings in Milton, Massachusetts
