= Brookwood Farm =

- U.S. National Register of Historic Places
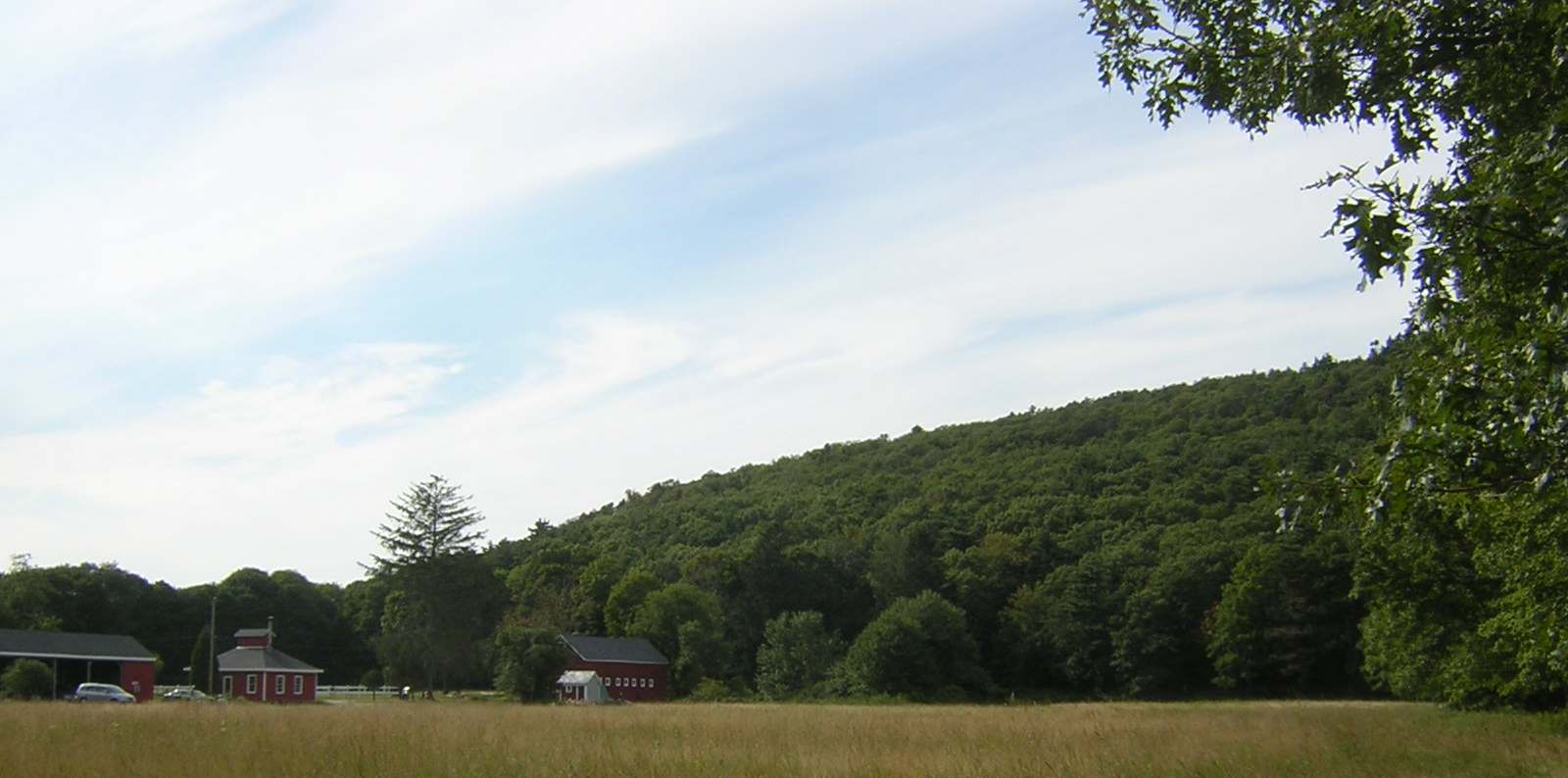
- Old Barn in center, Great Blue Hill behind

- Location within Massachusetts Location within the United States
- Location: Blue Hill River Road, Canton, Massachusetts
- Coordinates: 42°12′25.5″N 71°6′39.8″W
- Built: 1800
- Architectural style: Cape Cod
- MPS: Blue Hills and Neponset River Reservations MRA
- NRHP reference No.: 80000655
- Added to NRHP: September 25, 1980

Brookwood Farm is a historic farm on Blue Hill River Road in Canton, Massachusetts. Some of its fields, but none of the buildings, are in Milton. It is owned by the Commonwealth of Massachusetts and managed by the Department of Conservation and Recreation.

== Property ==
Its oldest building, the Old Barn was built in 1690. The Cape Cod style house located on the street was built in 1800. The larger house, set about 1,500 feet (500m) back from the street, converted from a hunting lodge in 1954, has been considered for a Governor's Mansion. There are also several outbuildings. All of the buildings, except the Old Barn, are suffering from a lack of funding for their upkeep.

The farm comprises about 70 acres (30ha), about half in woods and the balance in fields. There are three ponds. It is bounded on the south by Route 128 / I-93, on the east by residences, on the west by property owned by Meditech and on the north by Blue Hill River Road (which is called Hillside Street in Milton). Across Blue Hill River Road is Great Blue Hill.

== History ==
Its historical owner was General Samuel Parker, best known for his role in suppressing the 1919 Boston Police strike. The farm's most recent private owner was Henry Saltonstall Howe, an insurance executive, who bought it in 1951, built the house, and lived there as a bachelor gentleman farmer until his death in 1994. He had donated the property to the state with a life estate in 1976, so on his death it passed to the management of the Metropolitan District Commission which later became the Department of Conservation and Recreation. In 2006, the DCR granted a permit to Brookwood Community Farm, Inc., a non-profit, to organically farm 1-acre (4,000 m^{2}) for food and flowers. That has continued through 2010.

The farm was added to the National Register of Historic Places on September 25, 1980. The barn was added separately at the same time.

== Gallery ==
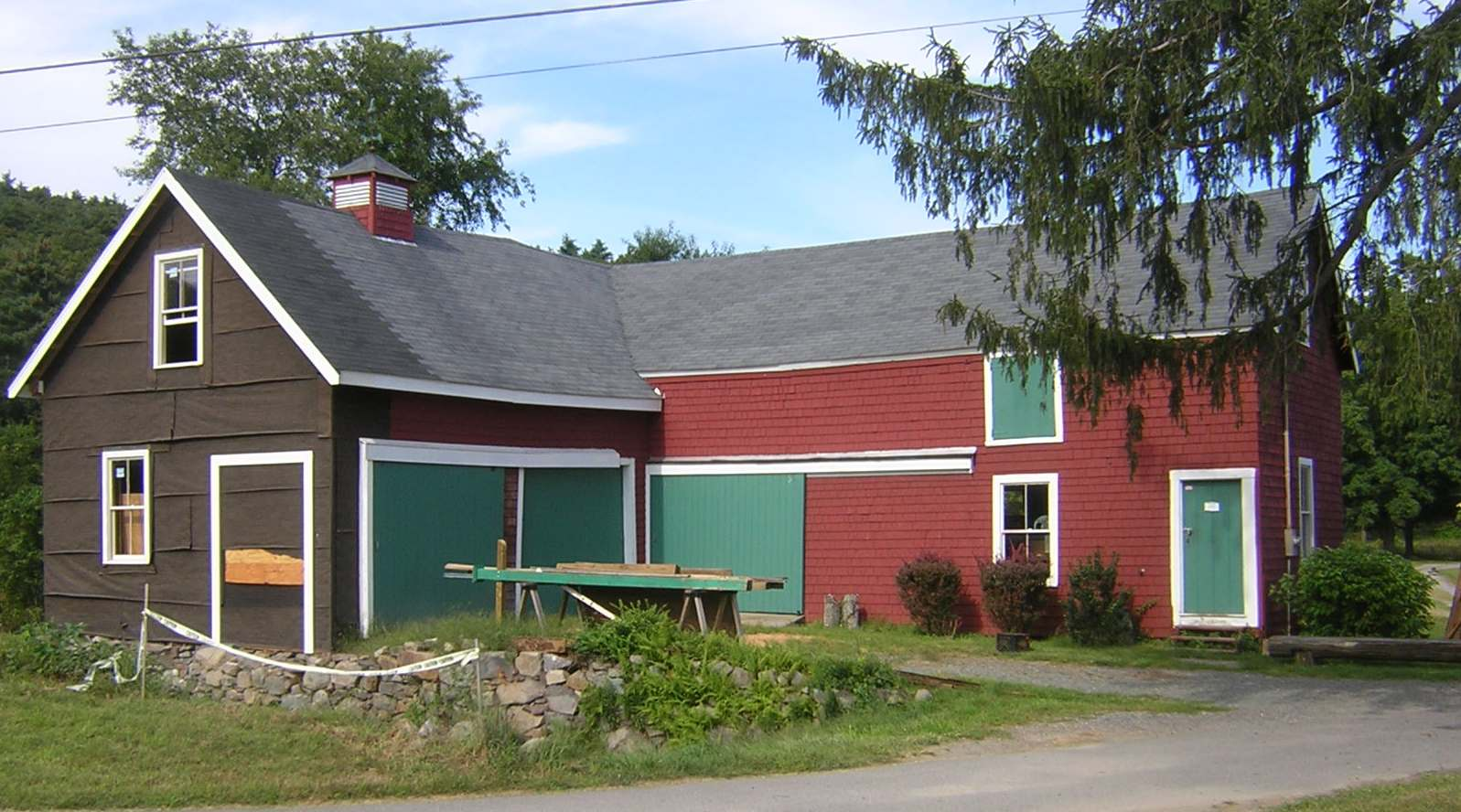
Old Barn

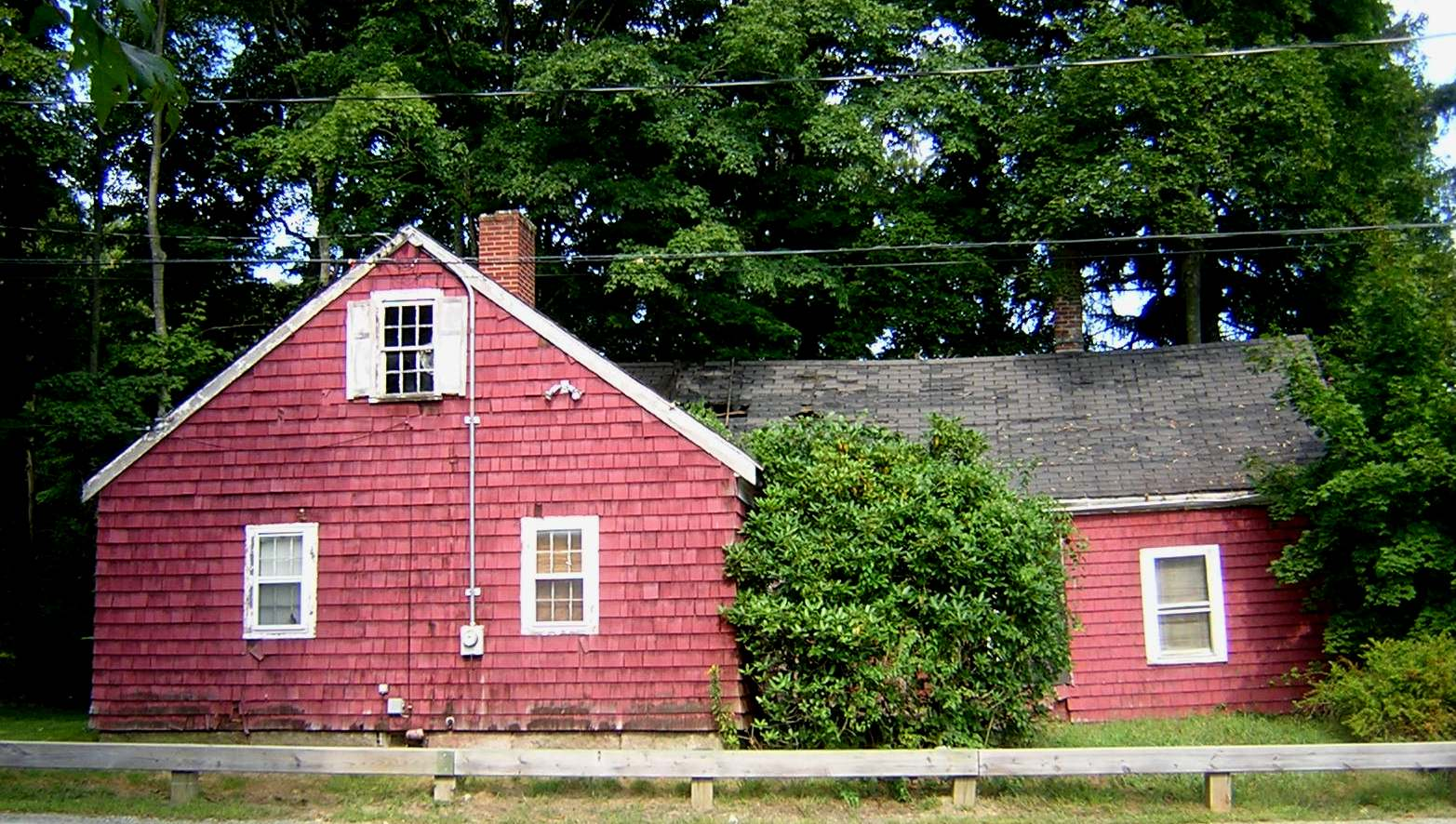
1800 Farmhouse
west side

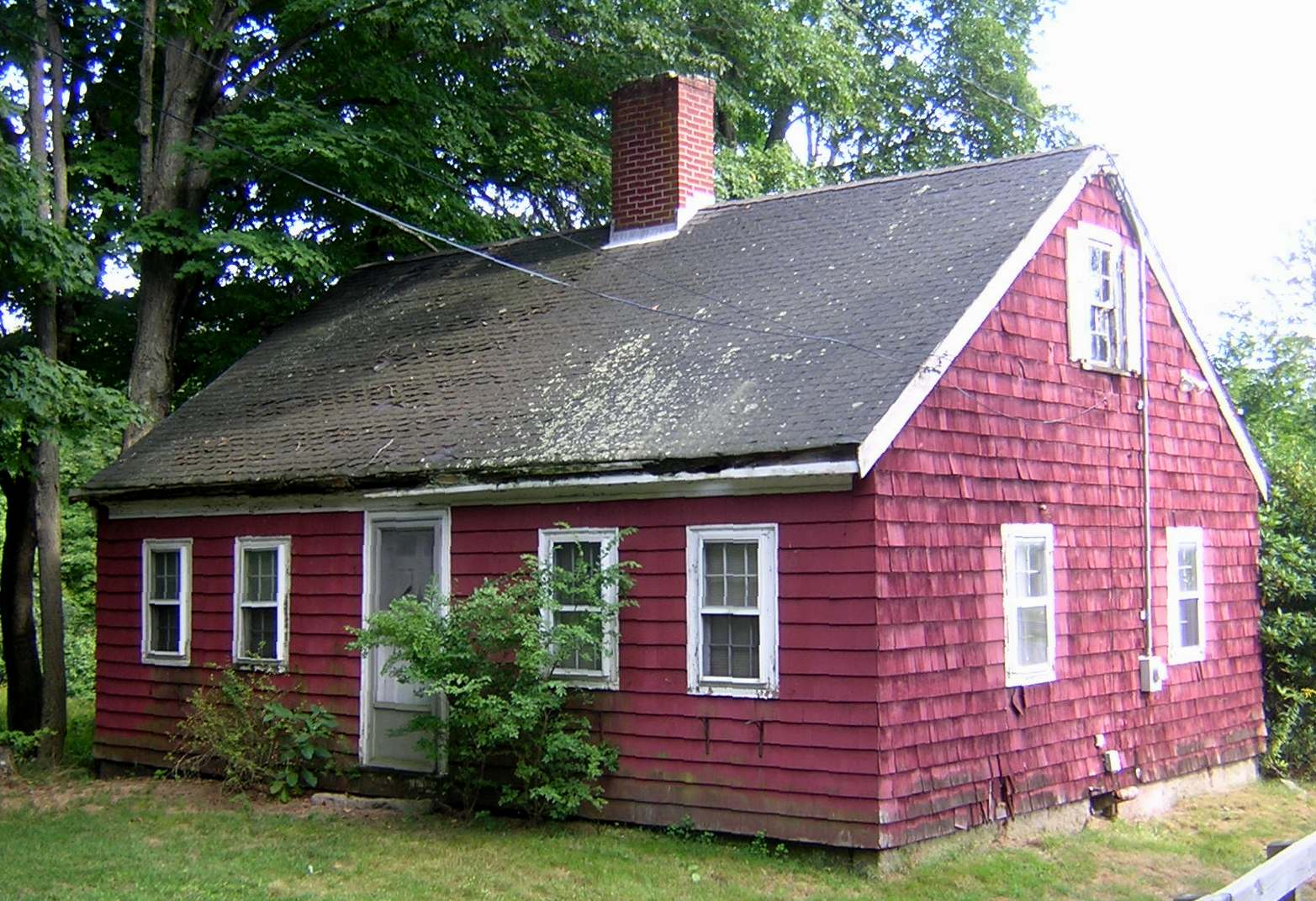
1800 Farmhouse
north and west sides

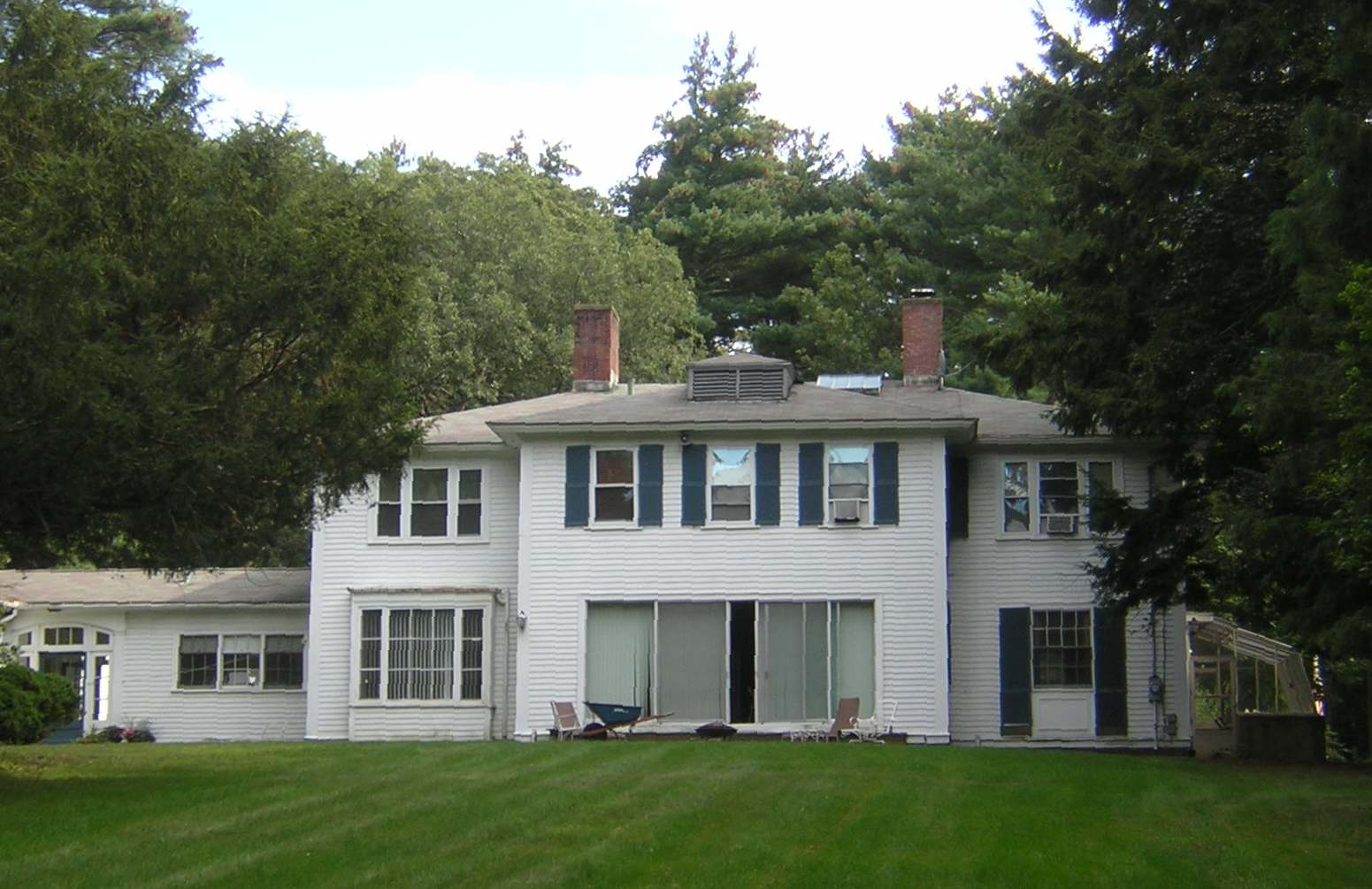
1954 Main House
north side

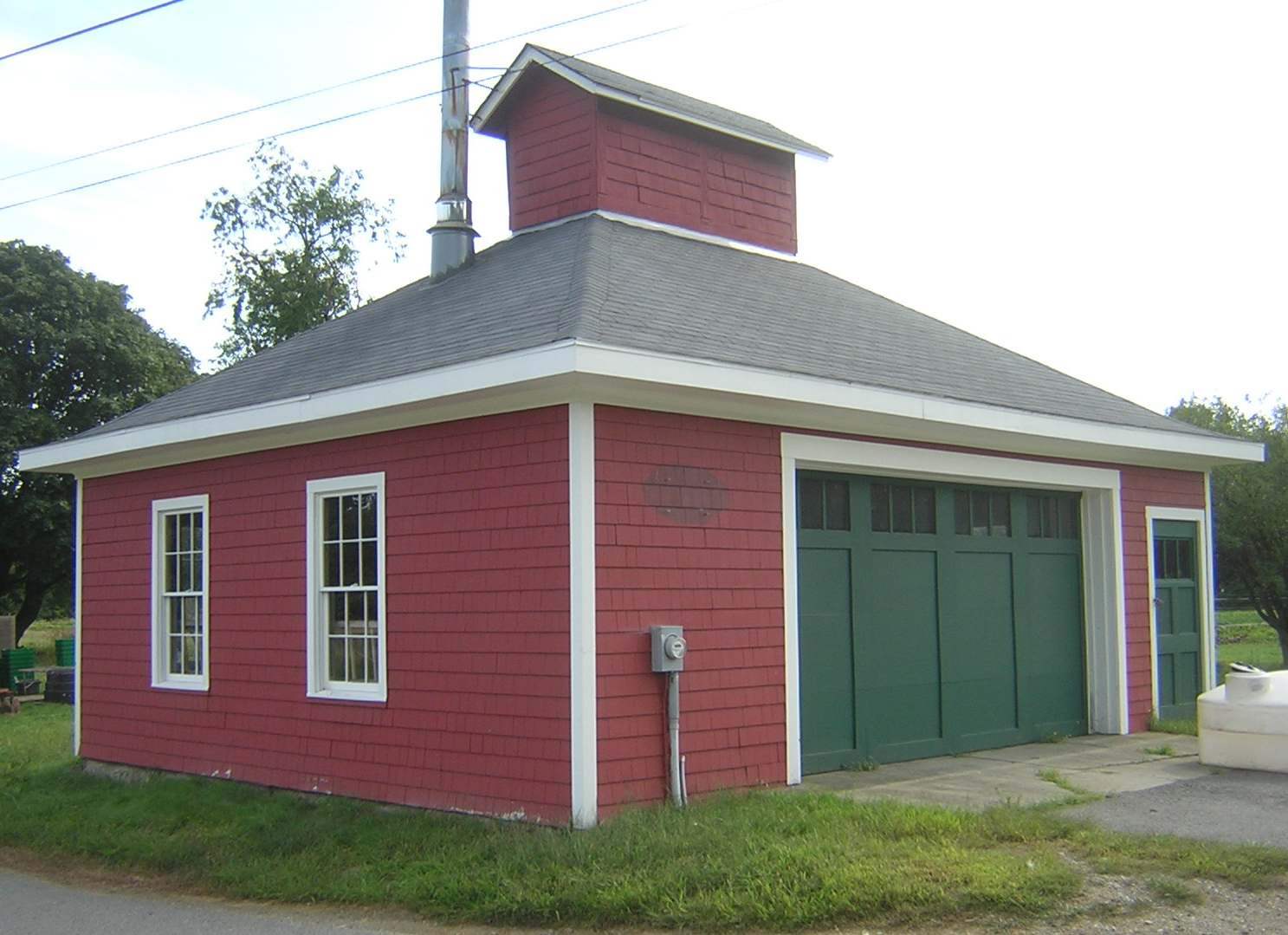
Garage
now the sugarhouse

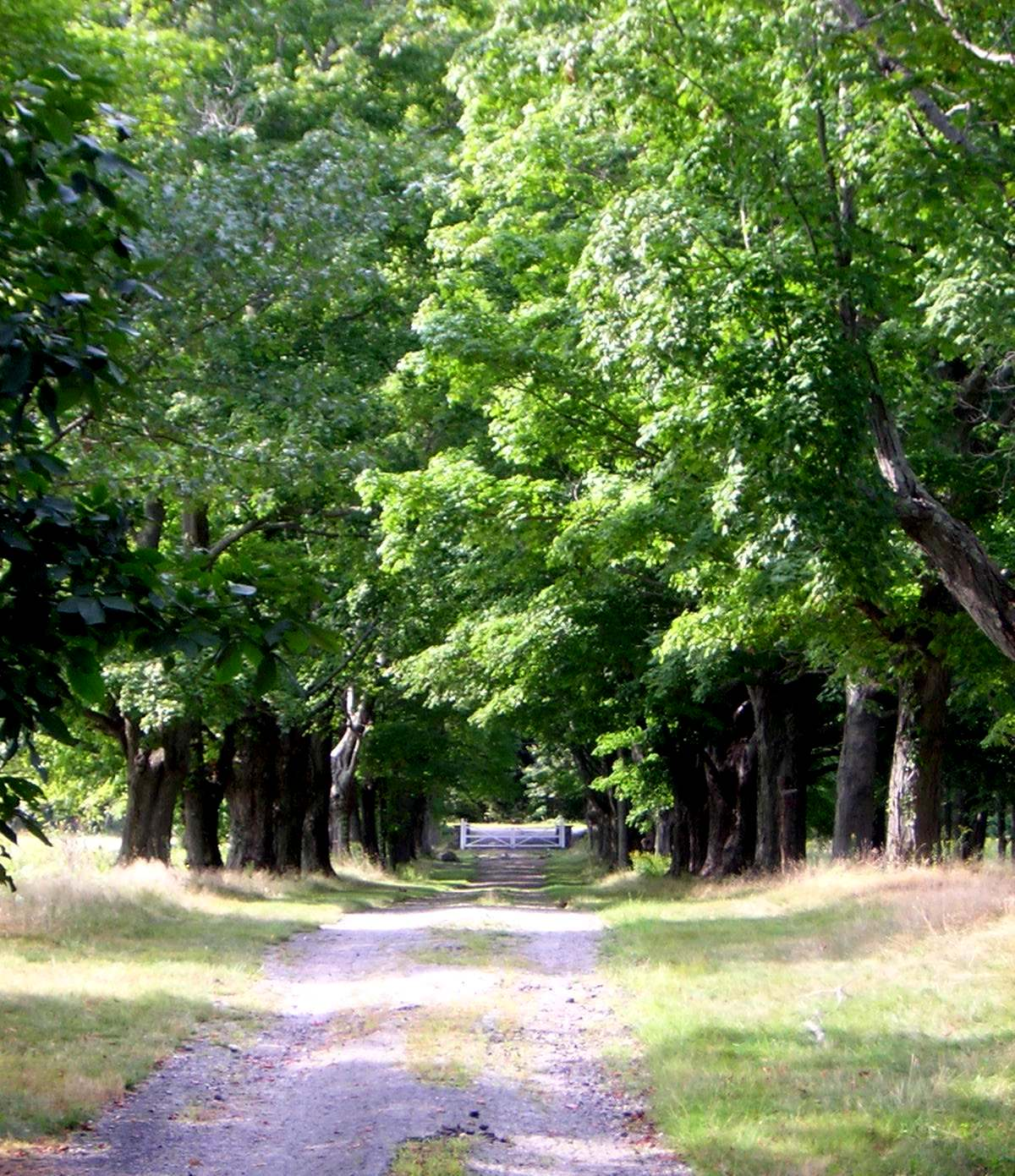
Maple lane. The trees supply sap for the sugaring every winter

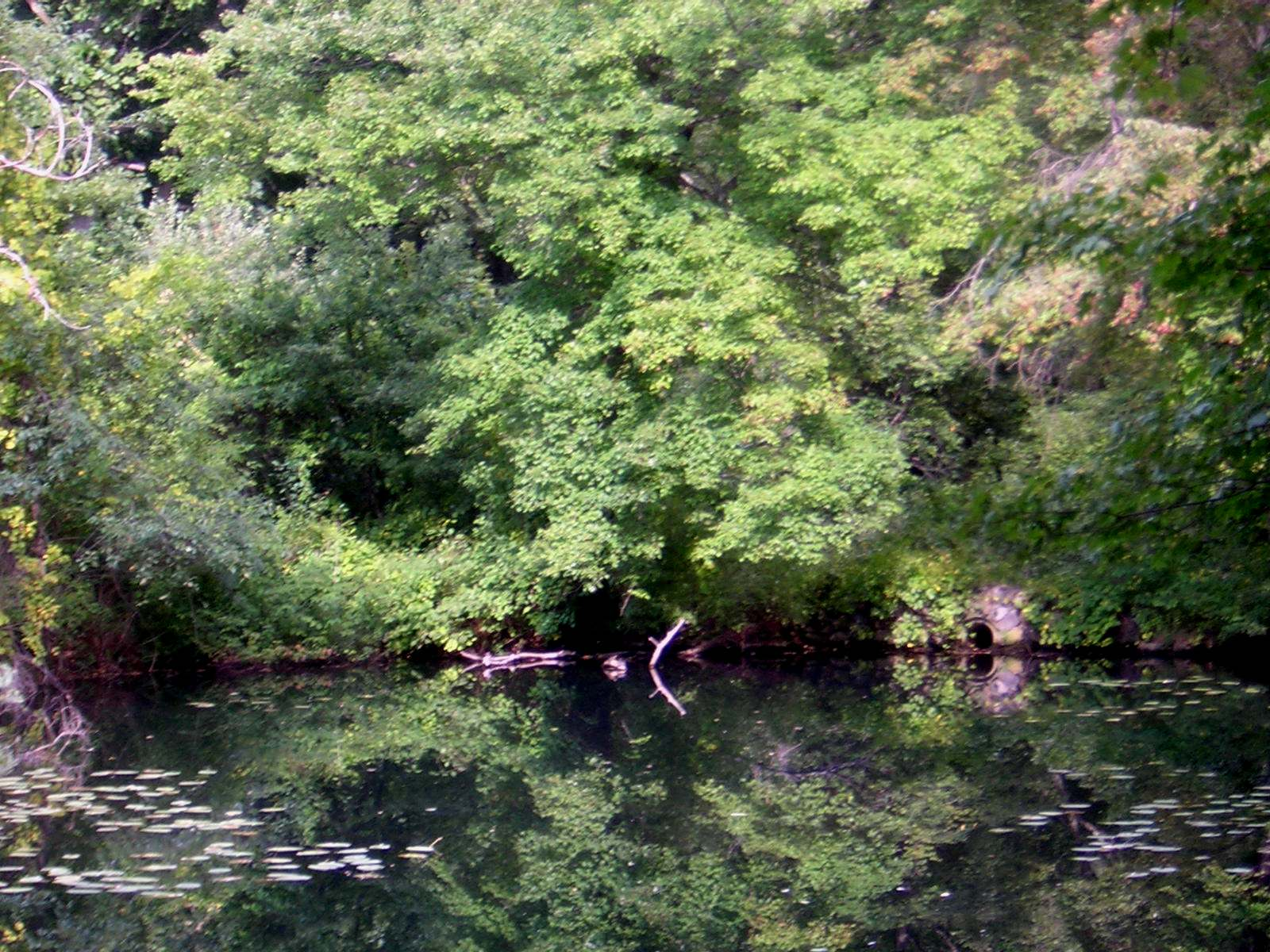
Upper pond, home of snapping turtles

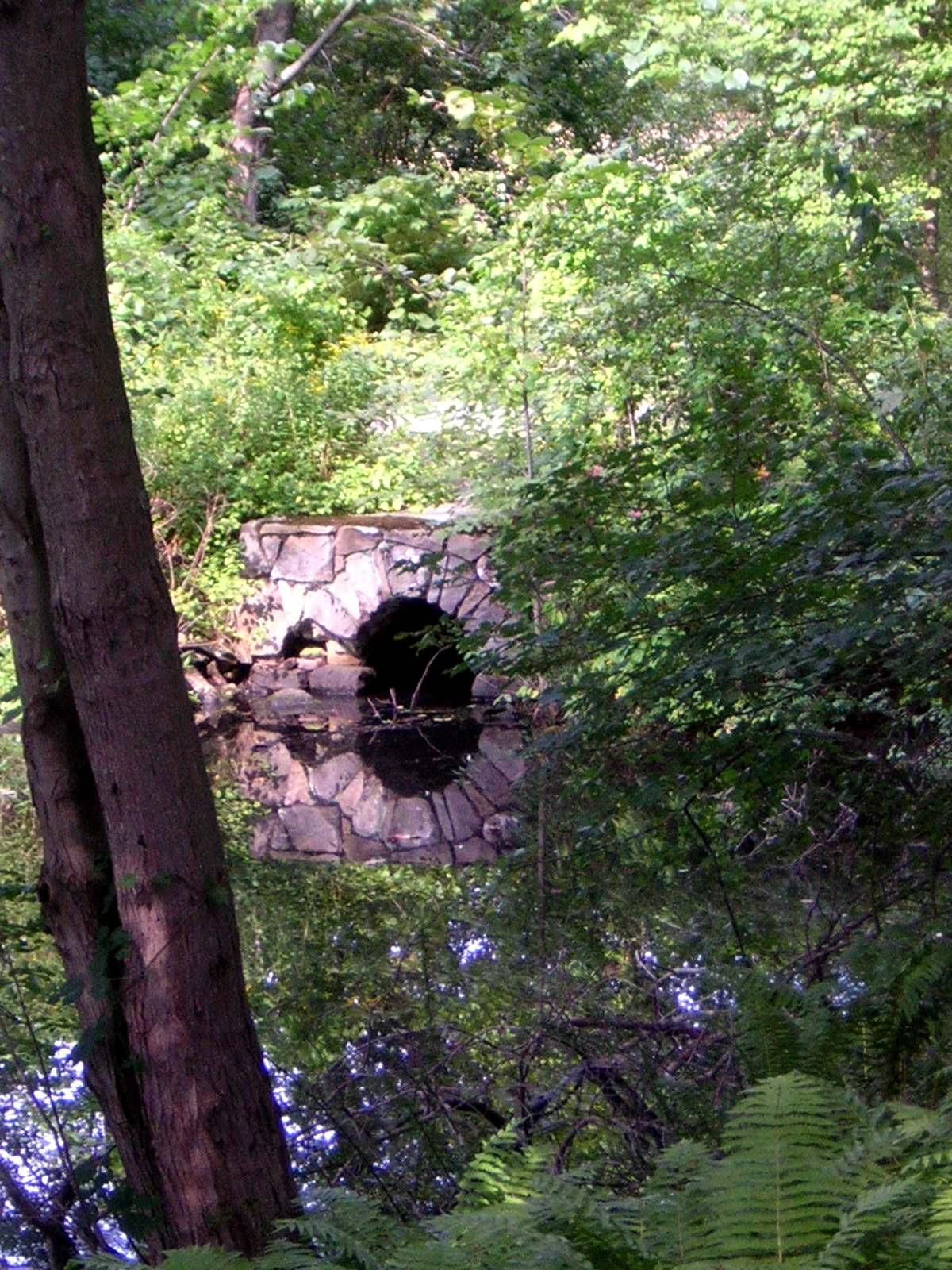
Lower pond

== See also ==
- National Register of Historic Places listings in Milton, Massachusetts
- National Register of Historic Places listings in Norfolk County, Massachusetts
