= Old Barn (Canton, Massachusetts) =

- U.S. National Register of Historic Places
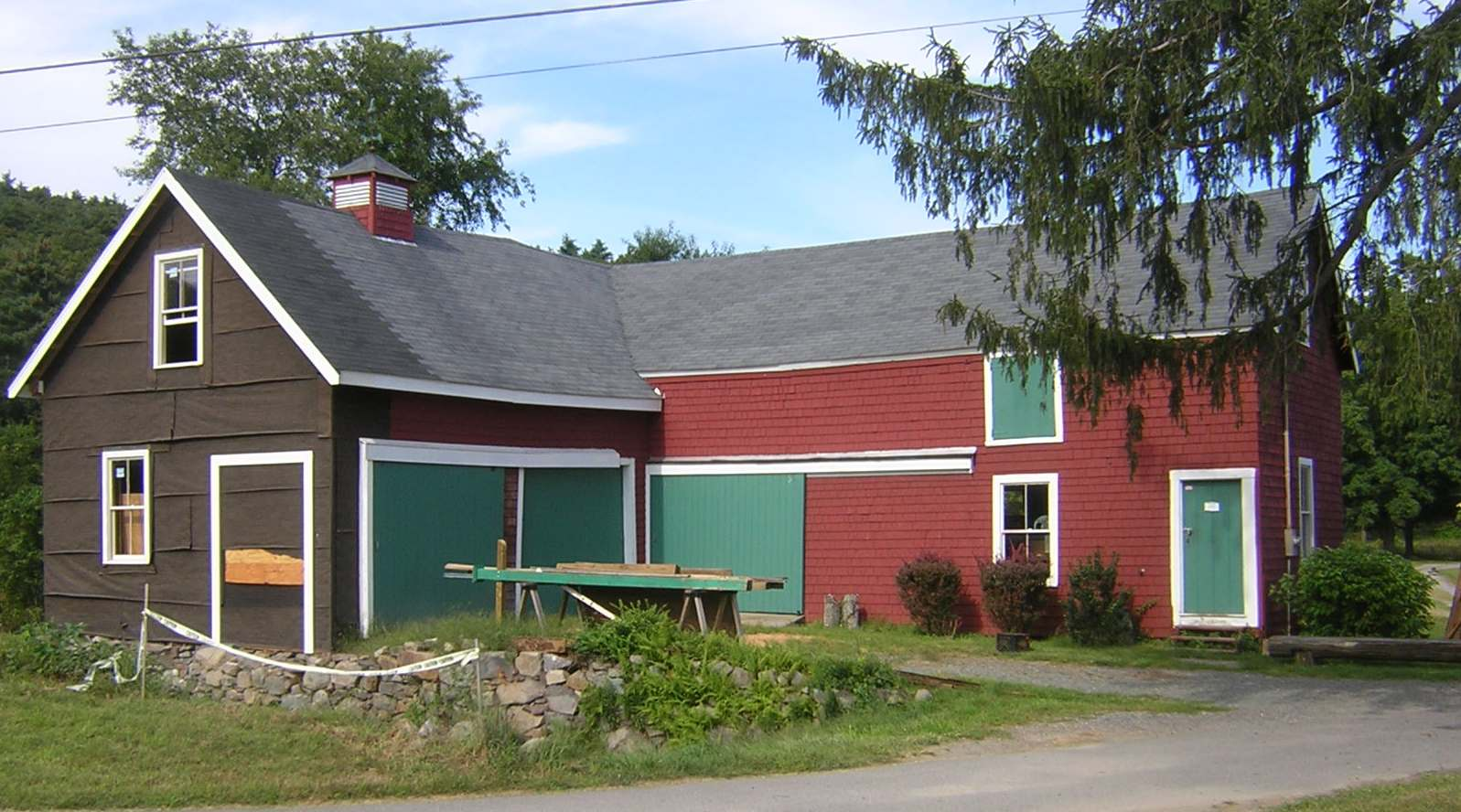
- West and south faces

- Location within Massachusetts Location within the United States
- Location: Off Blue Hill River Road in Canton, Massachusetts
- Coordinates: 42°12′25.5″N 71°6′39.8″W
- Built: 1690
- MPS: Blue Hills and Neponset River Reservations MRA
- NRHP reference No.: 80000660
- Added to NRHP: September 25, 1980

The Old Barn is a historic barn off Blue Hill River Road in Canton, Massachusetts.

Based on the construction methods used, it is estimated to have been built between 1690 and 1720, and is the oldest building on Brookwood Farm. It is currently undergoing a major restoration undertaken by the North Bennet Street School. They have removed the oldest 20-by-20-foot (6.1 m × 6.1 m) section for major work to repair rot and insect damage. It is expected to be returned to the site in 2010 or 2011. All of the photographs here are of the portions of the barn built after the original barn.

The barn was added to the National Register of Historic Places as Old Barn on September 25, 1980.

== Gallery ==
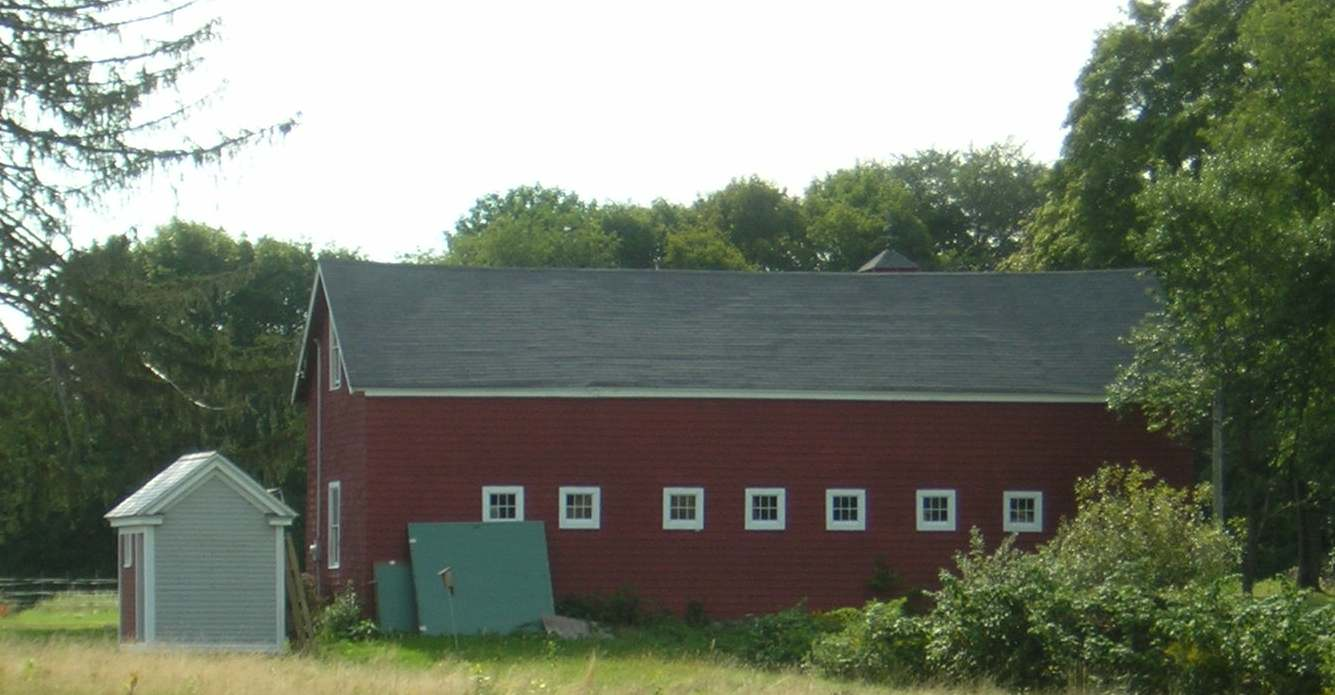
East face

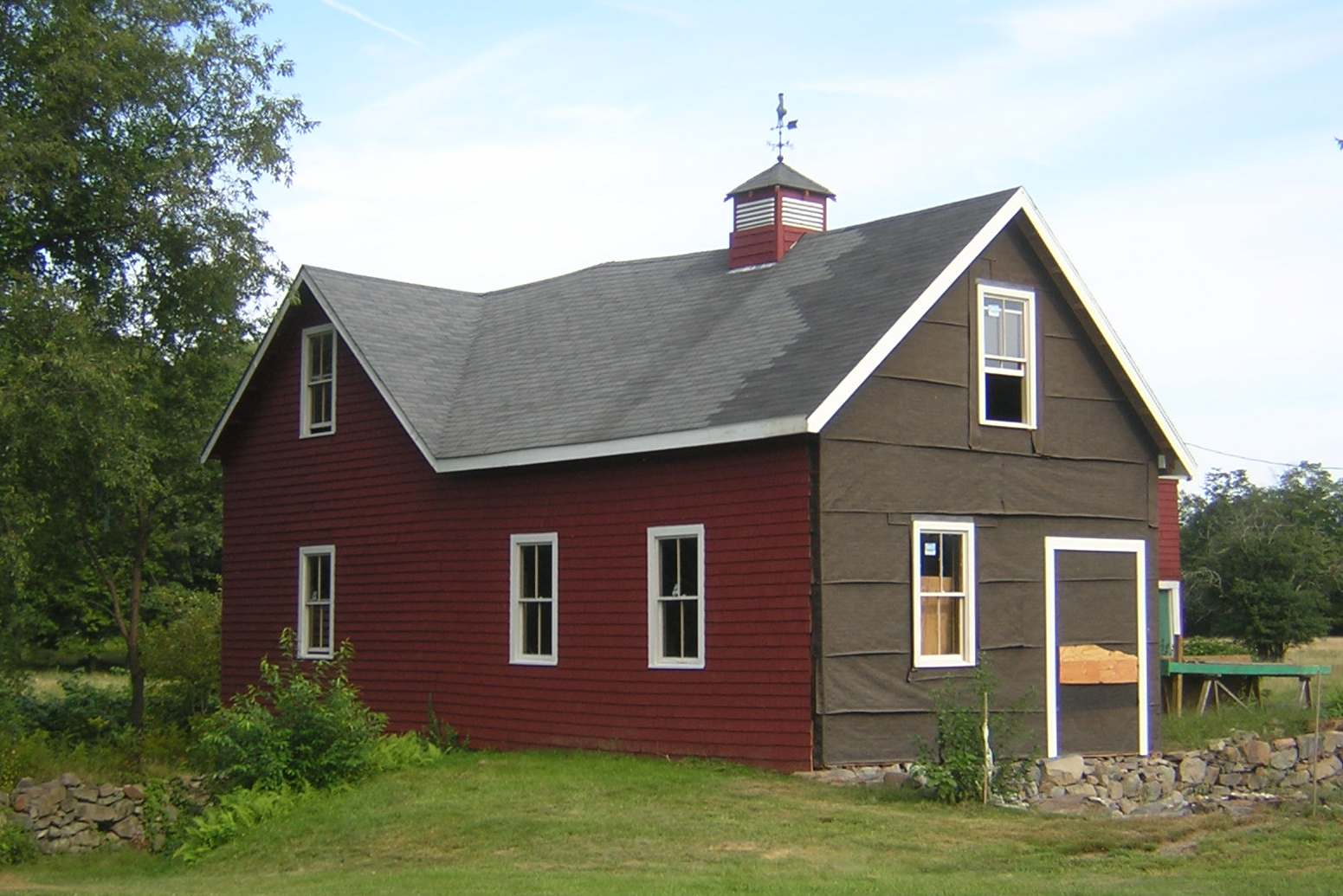
North and west faces

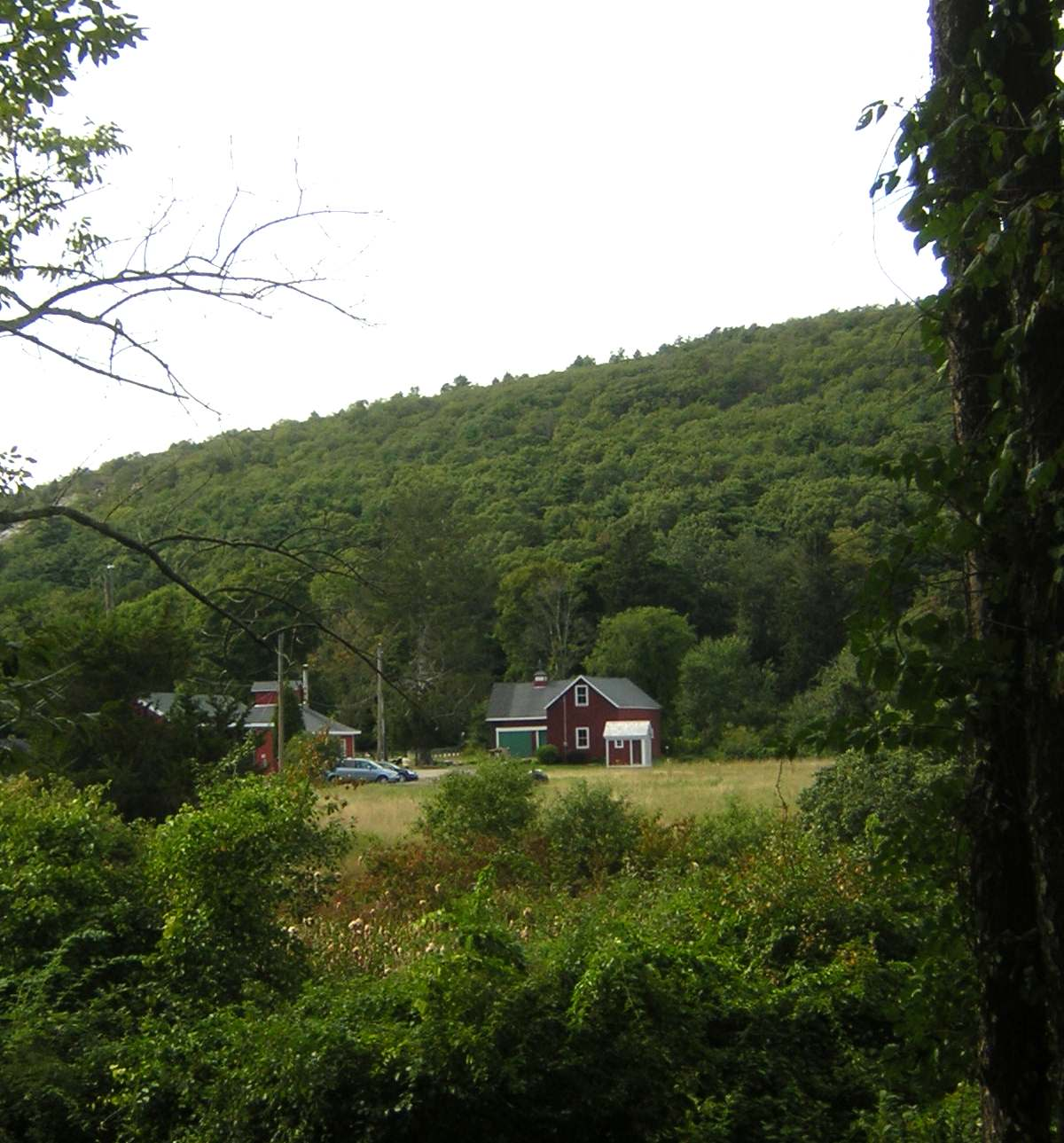
Great Blue Hill in background

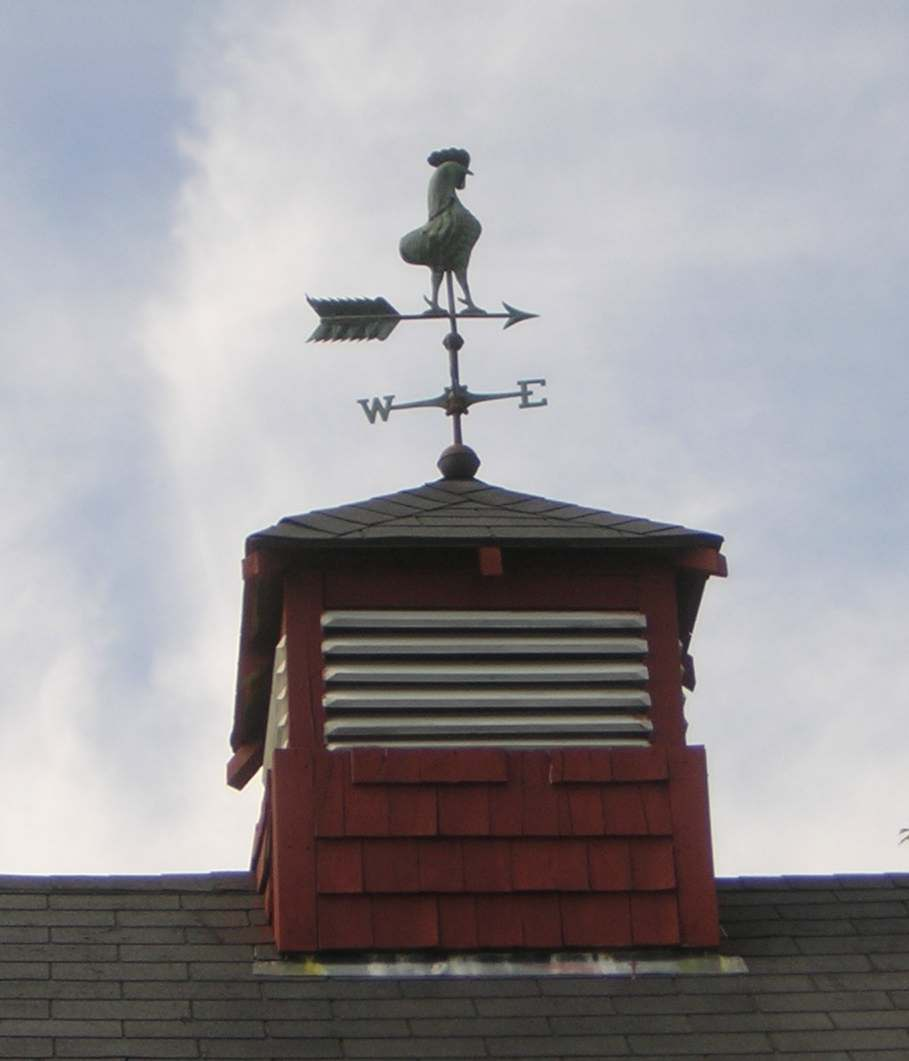
Weathervane. The cock's tail is in the barn.

== See also ==
- National Register of Historic Places listings in Norfolk County, Massachusetts
