= United States Post Office–Milton Main =

- US Post Office-Milton Main
- U.S. National Register of Historic Places
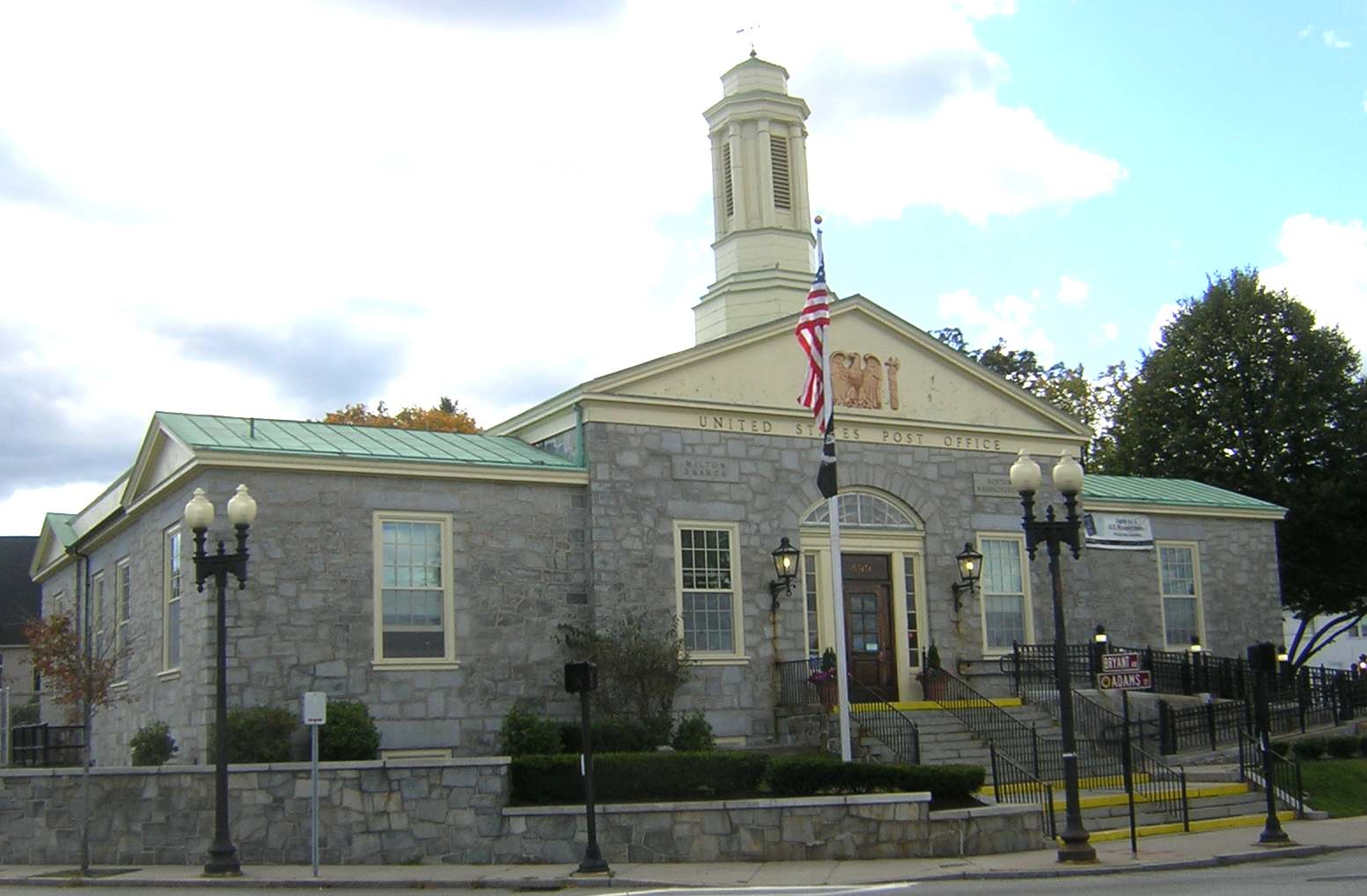

- Location within Massachusetts Location within the United States
- Location: 499 Adams St., Milton, Massachusetts
- Coordinates: 42°15′30″N 71°2′32.5″W
- Built: 1936; 90 years ago
- Architect: Simon, Louis A.
- Architectural style: Colonial Revival
- NRHP reference No.: 86001213
- Added to NRHP: May 30, 1986

The Milton Main Post Office is a historic post office building at 499 Adams Street in Milton, Massachusetts. Built in 1936, the building is a good example of Great Depression-era public works projects, and a fine local example of Colonial Revival architecture. The building, still active as a post office, was listed on the National Register of Historic Places in 1986.

== Description and history ==
Milton's main post office is located on the west side of East Milton Square, overlooking the Southeast Expressway from a lot bounded on the east by Bryan Ave, the north by Adams Street, and the south by Edge Hill Road. It is a single-story structure, built out of locally quarried granitee. It is topped by a copper-clad gabled roof with stuccoed end pediments, and the building is topped by an octagonal tower with louvered sides and an ornate Colonial Revival cupola. The main facade faces roughly northeast, and is five bays wide, with a projecting center section. The main entrance is at the center, flanked by sidelight windows and topped by an eyebrow window.

The interior public lobby has terrazzo marble flooring, and white marble wainscoting, with the walls above finished in plaster. The ceiling is ringed by an ornamental plaster cornice. One wall is decorated by a mural depicting scenes of the American Revolution painted by Elizabeth Tracy and funded by the Treasury Section of Painting and Sculpture, a Depression-era jobs program.

The building was constructed in 1936-1937 with funding from the Public Works Administration (PWA), to a design from the office of Treasury architect Louis A. Simon. The PWA building programs emphasized speed of construction, but construction of this building was delayed by a fire in a warehouse holding building supplies and by backordered equipment. It is not known if the stone used in its construction was sourced within the town of Milton, whose granite quarries were in decline at the time.

== Gallery ==
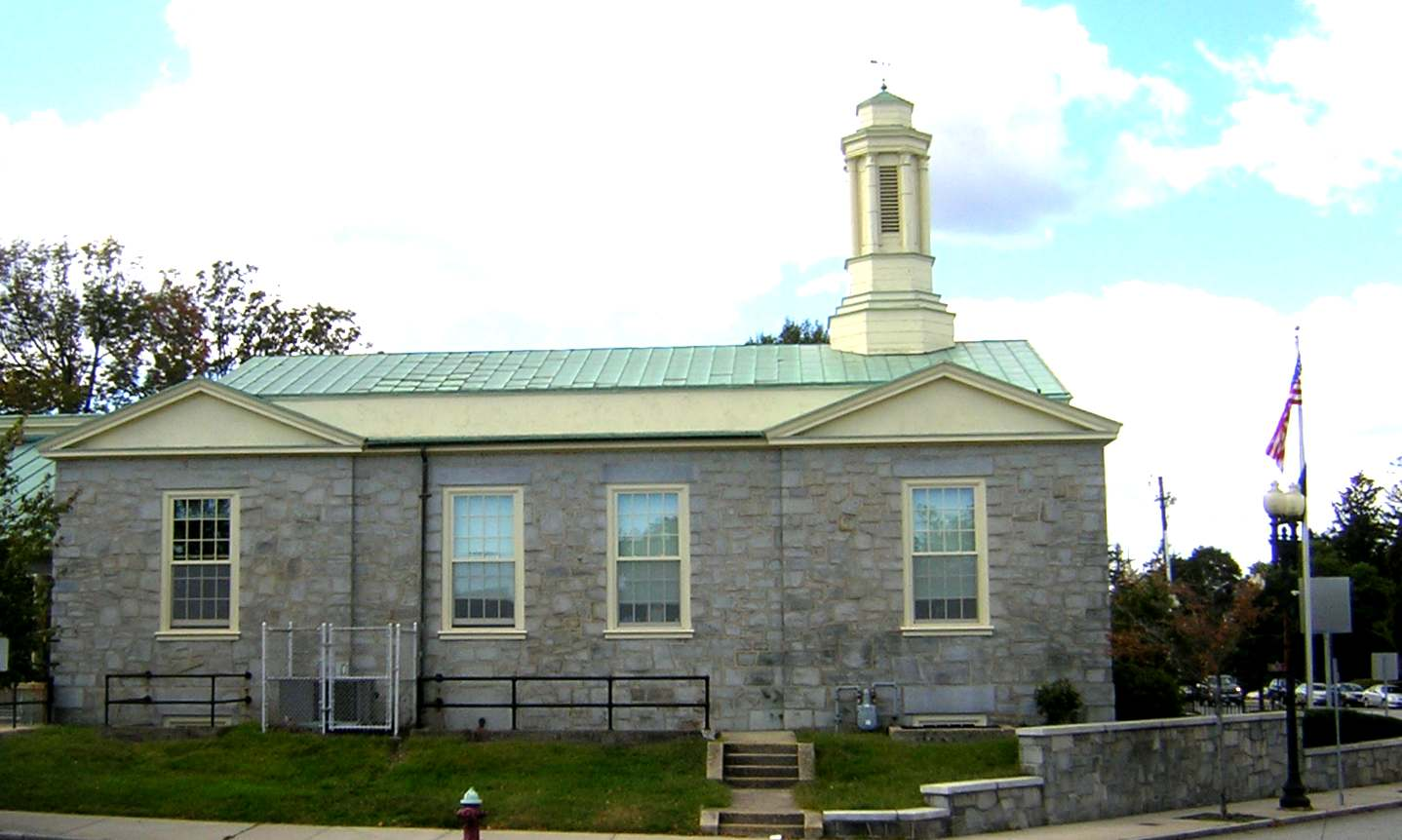
Southeast side

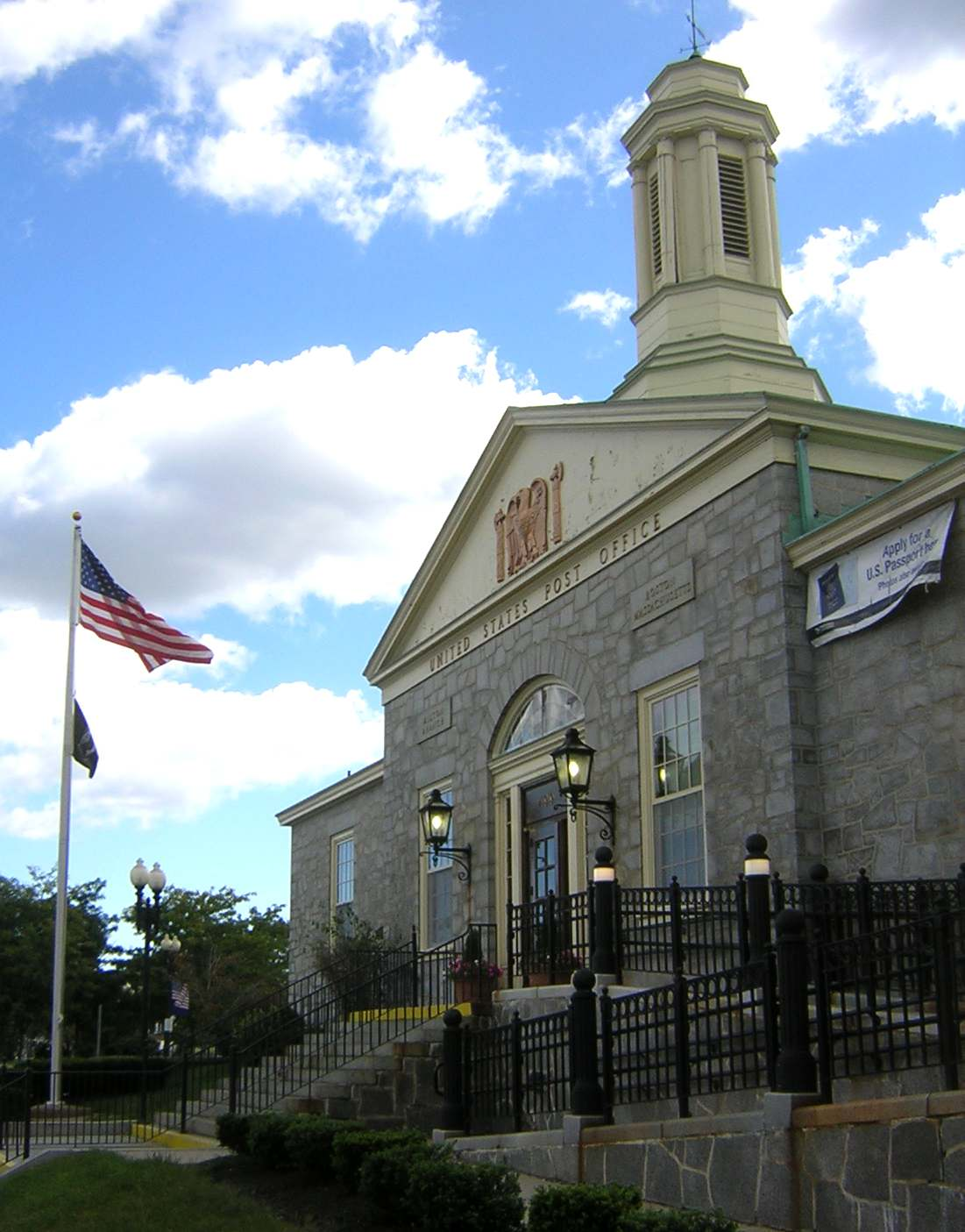

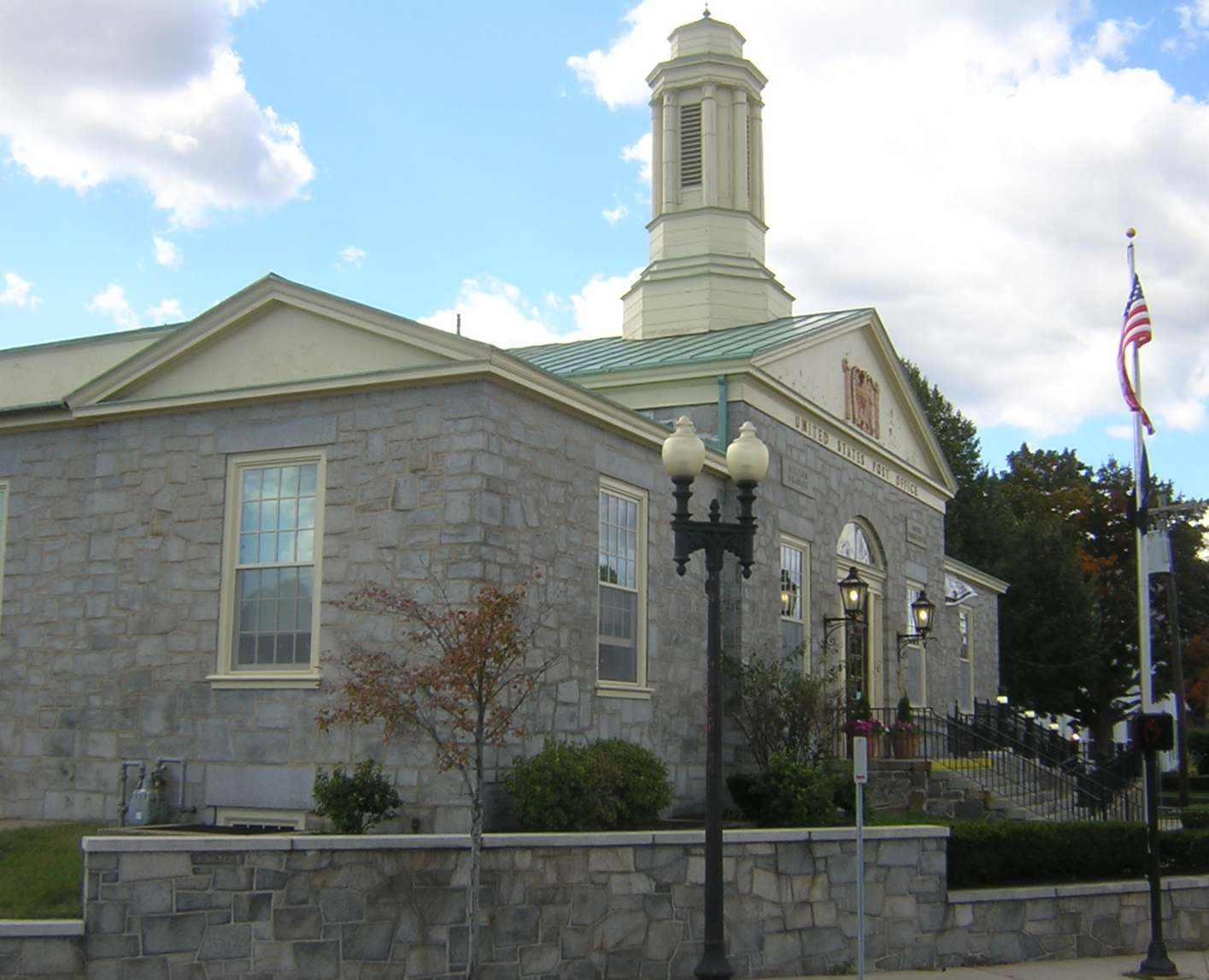

== See also ==
- National Register of Historic Places listings in Milton, Massachusetts
- List of United States post offices
