= National Register of Historic Places listings in Boston =

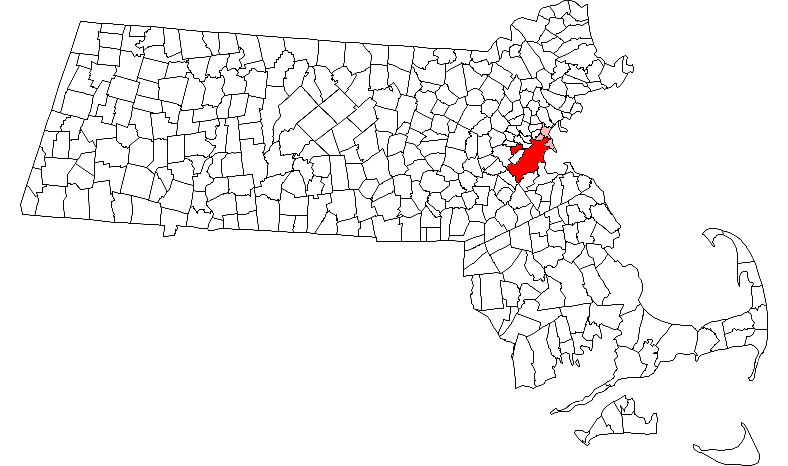
Location of Boston in Massachusetts

As a city with a long and rich history, Boston, Massachusetts naturally has a great many properties and districts listed on the National Register of Historic Places. There are 354 properties and districts listed on the National Register in Suffolk County, Massachusetts, including 59 National Historic Landmarks. The city of Boston is the location of 330 of these properties and districts, including 58 National Historic Landmarks. Properties and districts located in the county's other three municipalities are listed separately.

Contents: Counties in Massachusetts

Barnstable | Berkshire | Bristol | Dukes | Essex | Franklin | Hampden | Hampshire | Middlesex | Nantucket | Norfolk | Plymouth | Suffolk | Worcester

This National Park Service list is complete through NPS recent listings posted June 20, 2025.

== Current listings ==
Because of the large number of listings, the list has been split into northern and southern listings, divided by the Massachusetts Turnpike. Two historic districts overlap into both northern and southern Boston: the 1767 Milestones, and the Olmsted Park System.

Area	Image	First Date listed	Last Date listed	Count
Northern		October 15, 1966	December 26, 2023	149
Southern		October 15, 1966	May 6, 2024	184

== See also ==
- List of National Historic Landmarks in Massachusetts
- National Register of Historic Places listings in Massachusetts
