= Neponset, California =

Unincorporated community in California, United States

Neponset
- Unincorporated community
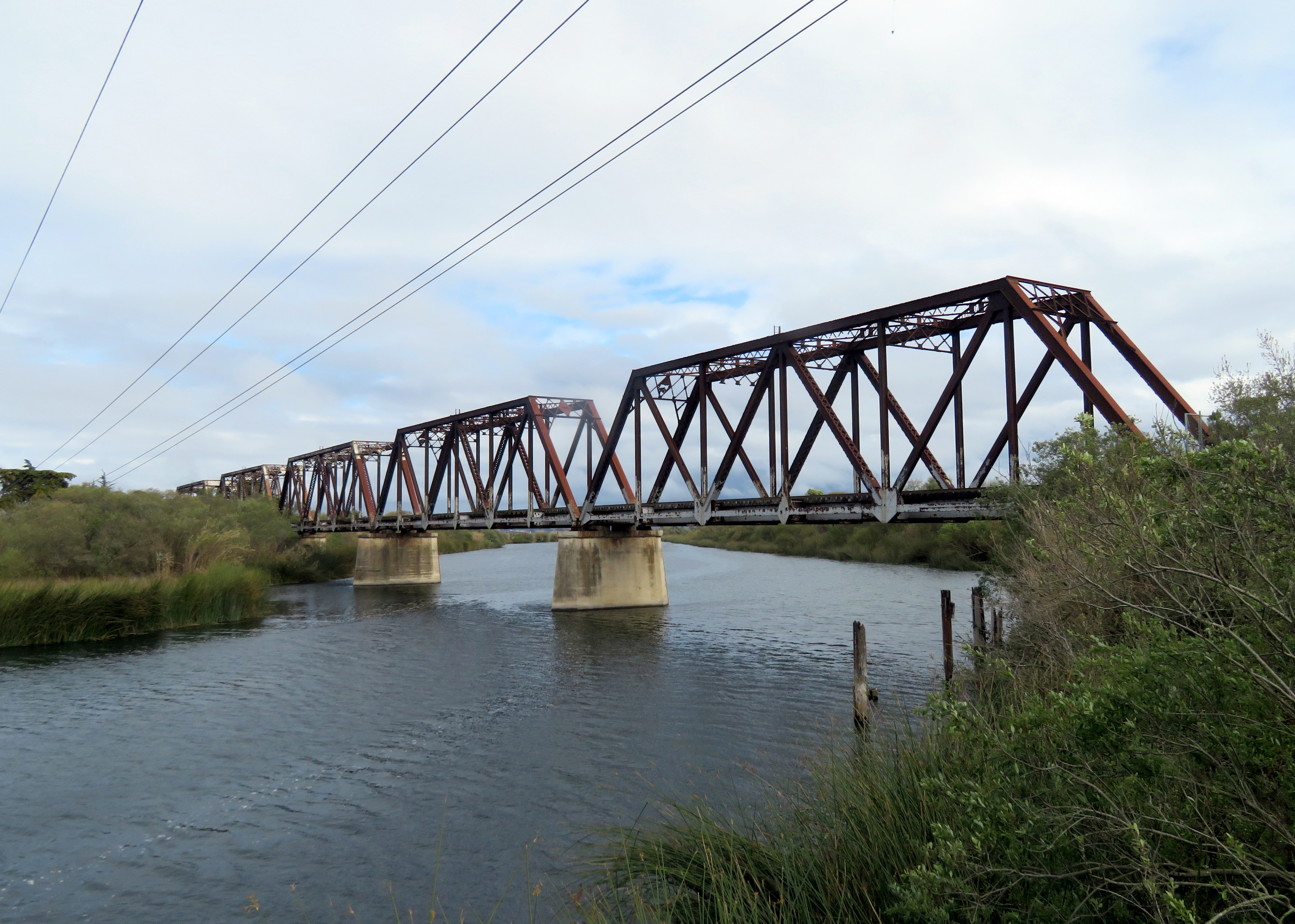
- Railroad bridge over the Salinas River at Neponset

- Location in Monterey County and the state of California Neponset (the United States)
- Coordinates: 36°43′43″N 121°47′5″W
- Country: United States
- State: California
- County: Monterey
- Elevation: 187 ft (57 m)
  - Summer (DST): UTC-7 (PDT)
- ZIP code: 93908
- Area code: 831

Neponset (Martin's Station until 1900) is an unincorporated community in Monterey County, California, United States. It is located along the Southern Pacific Railroad and California State Route 1 between Marina and Castroville, and 8.5 miles (14 km) northwest of Salinas, at an elevation of 23 feet (7 m).

== History ==
In 1890, Martin's Station had a school house and several ranches.

Martin's Station was renamed in 1900 to "Neponset", after Neponset, Boston, Massachusetts. In the early 1900s, several announcements of families living in Neponset were listed in The Californian newspaper. The Neponset Temperance Club was started by local men.

== Railroad information ==
Monte Road is a frontage road that runs beside State Route 1, south of the Salinas River crossing. The railroad tracks still exist outside the Dole Food Company plant. The tracks break off just at the staff parking lot. Neponset Road wraps around the plant on its southern edge.

== See also ==
- Coastal California
- List of school districts in Monterey County, California
- List of tourist attractions in Monterey County, California
