= Neponset River Reservation =

Park in Massachusetts, US

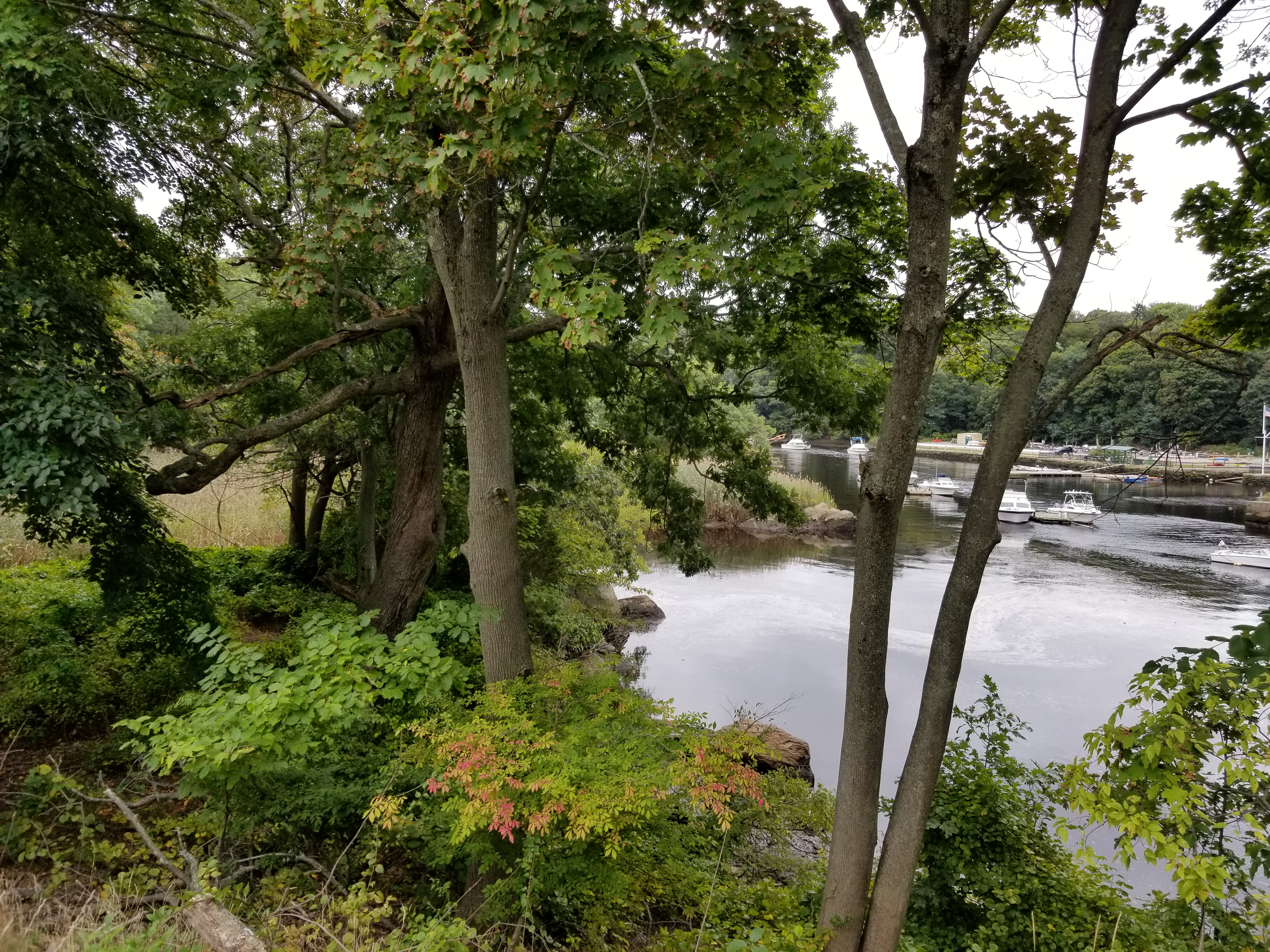
- View from Dorchester side to Milton on the other side of the river

- Location within Greater Boston area Location within Massachusetts Location within the United States
- Location: Milton and Dorchester, Massachusetts, United States
- Coordinates: 42°16′47″N 71°2′42″W
- Area: 1,880 acres (760 ha)
- Established: 1896
- Administrator: Massachusetts Department of Conservation and Recreation
- Website: Official website

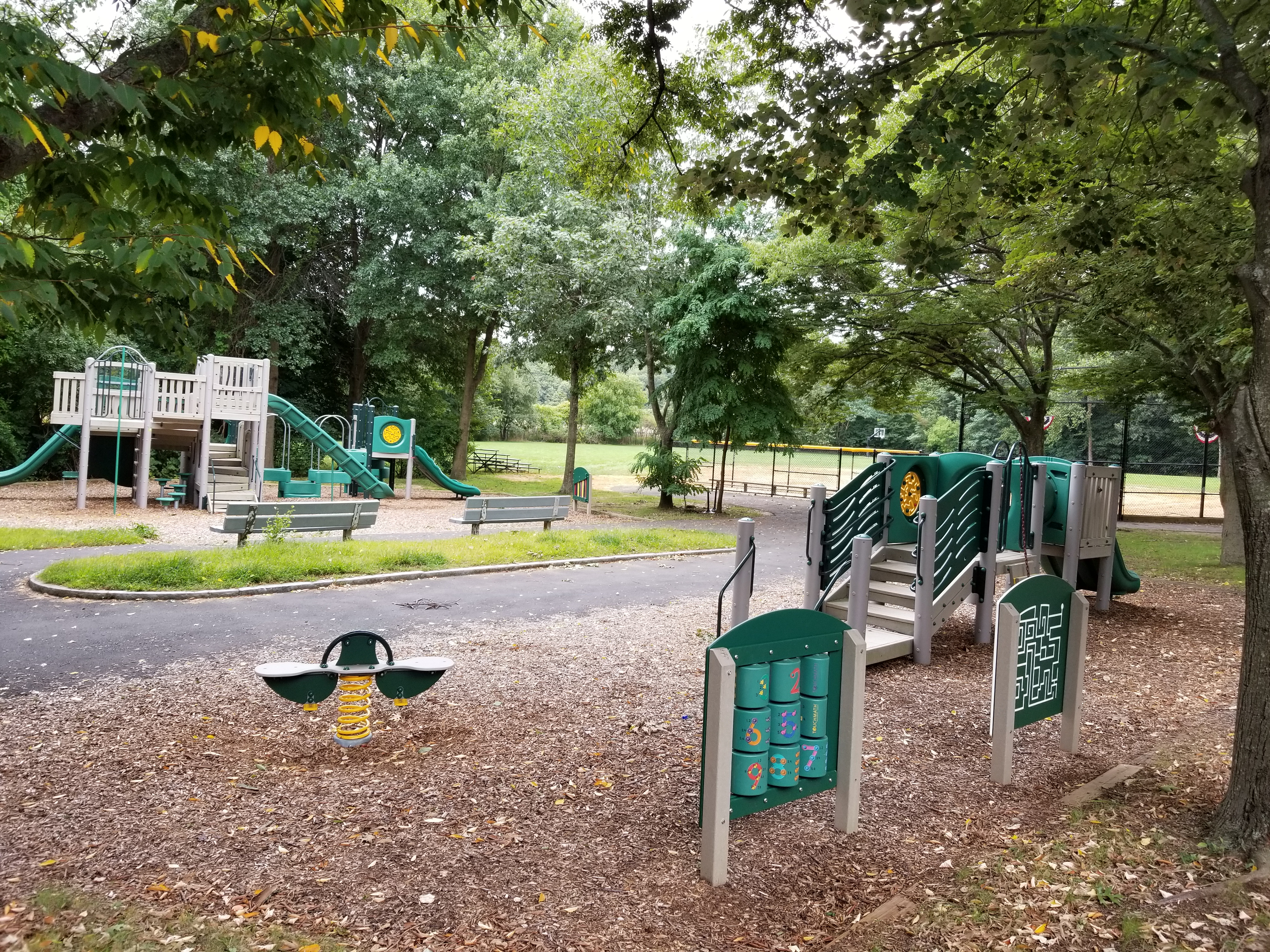
Ventura Street Playground in the Reservation in Dorchester

Neponset River Reservation is a Massachusetts state reservation along the Neponset River in the towns of Milton and Dorchester, near where the river flows through an estuary into the Boston Harbor. It is adjacent to the Dorchester-Milton Lower Mills Industrial District along the river. This was some of the last land retained by Cutshamekin (Massachusett) before he deeded much of the land comprising Dorchester and Milton to English colonists in the 17th century.

In February 2022, Massachusetts Governor Charlie Baker announced an $8.2 million project to construct a 0.7-mile shared-use path from Tenean Beach on the reservation to Morrissey Boulevard. It will connect the Boston Harborwalk with Neponset via Morrissey (including a 670-foot boardwalk in the salt marshes near the National Grid gas tank). The project will be one funded under the $9.5 billion in federal funds the state government received under the Infrastructure Investment and Jobs Act.

In March 2022, the United States Environmental Protection Agency (EPA) placed 3.7 miles of the Neponset River, between Mother Brook in Hyde Park to the Lower Mills, on the National Priorities List of the Superfund program for remediation due to sediment containing elevated levels of PCBs.
