= Historic Curatorship Program =

The Massachusetts Historic Curatorship Program is a leasing program under the Massachusetts Department of Conservation and Recreation (DCR) that promotes private investment in historic, public properties that are currently empty and in various states of disrepair. Through the Program, a curator is selected to restore and maintain one of the Program's properties in a “work for credit” exchange system. A curator is chosen through an open application process that can be found on the DCR's website. Average lease terms range from twenty to thirty years. As of 2021, twenty-two of the Program's properties were under agreement. The Program includes residential, commercial and institutional properties that are significant to the history of the Commonwealth.

== Properties Under Agreement ==
Wachusett Superintendent's House, Wachusett Mountain State Reservation (Princeton, MA)

Officers' Quarters, Fort Revere Park (Hull, MA)

Gatekeeper's House, Maudslay State Park (Newburyport, MA)

Bell House and Barn, Maudslay State Park (Newburyport, MA)

Coachman's House and Outbuildings, Maudslay State Park (Newburyport, MA)

Farmhouse, Maudslay State Park (Newburyport, MA)

Gatekeeper's House and Barn, Lowell Heritage State Park (Lowell, MA)

Horseneck Lifesaving Station, Horseneck Beach State Reservation (Westport, MA)

Smith Farmhouse, Borderland State Park (Easton, MA)

Wilbur Farmhouse, Borderland State Park (Easton, MA)

E.F. Dodge (Kerighan) House, Bradley Palmer State Park (Hamilton, MA)

Lamson House, Bradley Palmer State Park (Topsfield, MA)

Bradley Palmer Mansion, Coach House, and Carriage Garage, Bradley Palmer State Park (Topsfield, MA)

Bascom Lodge, Mount Greylock State Reservation (Adams, MA)

Crosby Mansion, Sully House, and Graham House, Nickerson State Park (Brewster, MA)

Harlow House, Ellisville Harbor State Park (Plymouth, MA)

Walter Baker Administration Building, Dorchester-Milton Lower Mills Industrial District (Boston, MA)

Glenledge Cottage (Viereck House), Halibut Point State Park (Rockport, MA)

Swann Lodge and Barn, Beartown State Forest (Monterey, MA)

Barton House, F. Gilbert Hills State Forest (Foxborough, MA)

Litchfield House, Great Brook Farm State Park (Carlisle, MA)

Speedway Administration Building, Charles River Reservation (Brighton, MA)
