= William D. Austin =

American architect

- Born: May 15, 1856; Dorchester, Massachusetts, United States
- Died: May 26, 1943 (aged 87); Cambridge, Massachusetts, United States
- Occupation: Architect

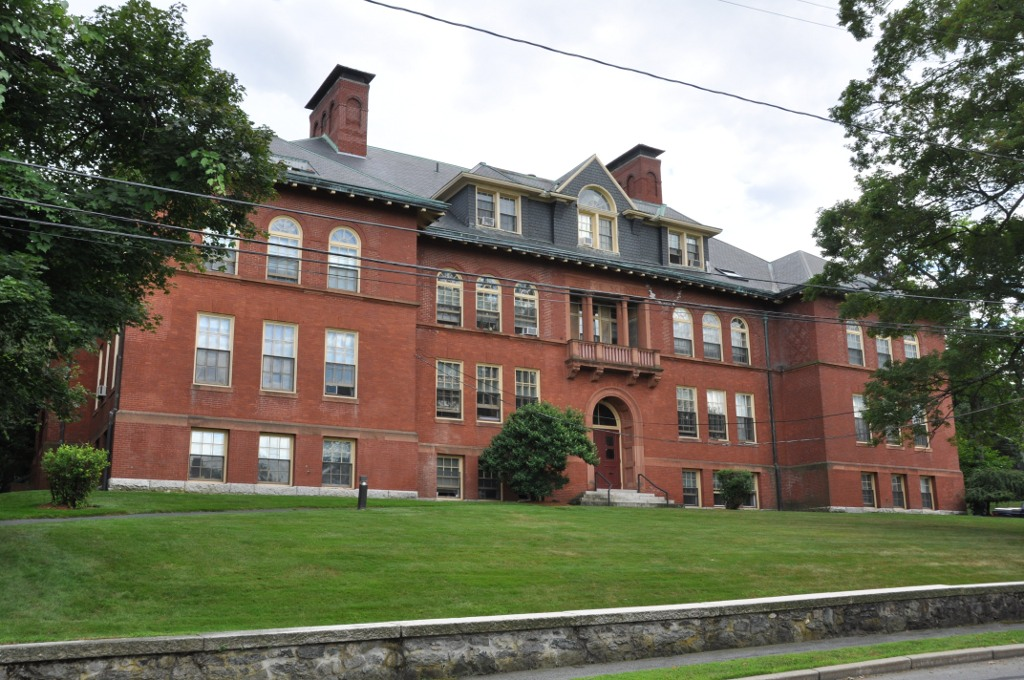
The former Peirce School (1895) in Newton, designed in the Colonial Revival style

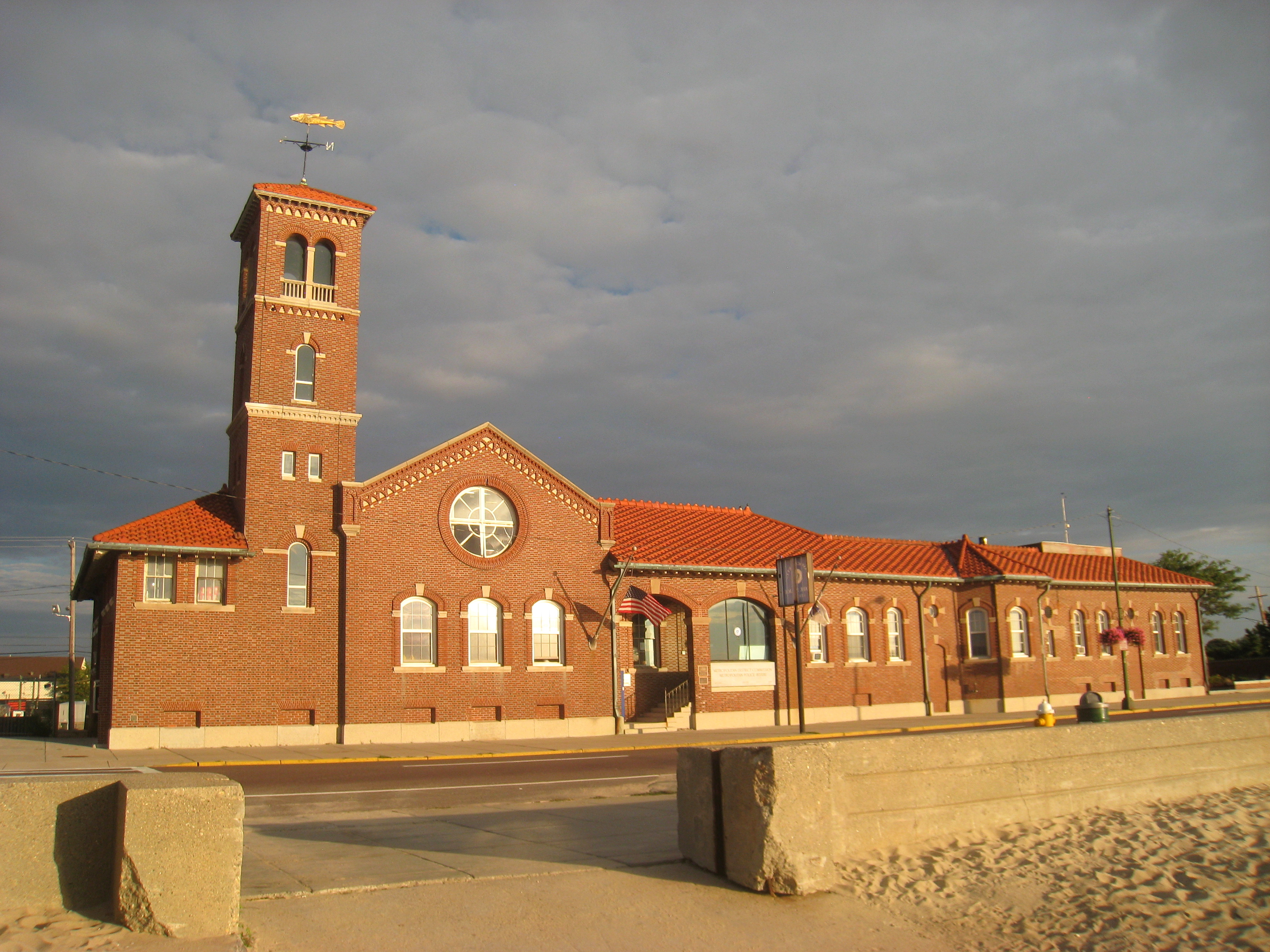
The Massachusetts State Police station (1899) at Revere Beach, designed in the Renaissance Revival style

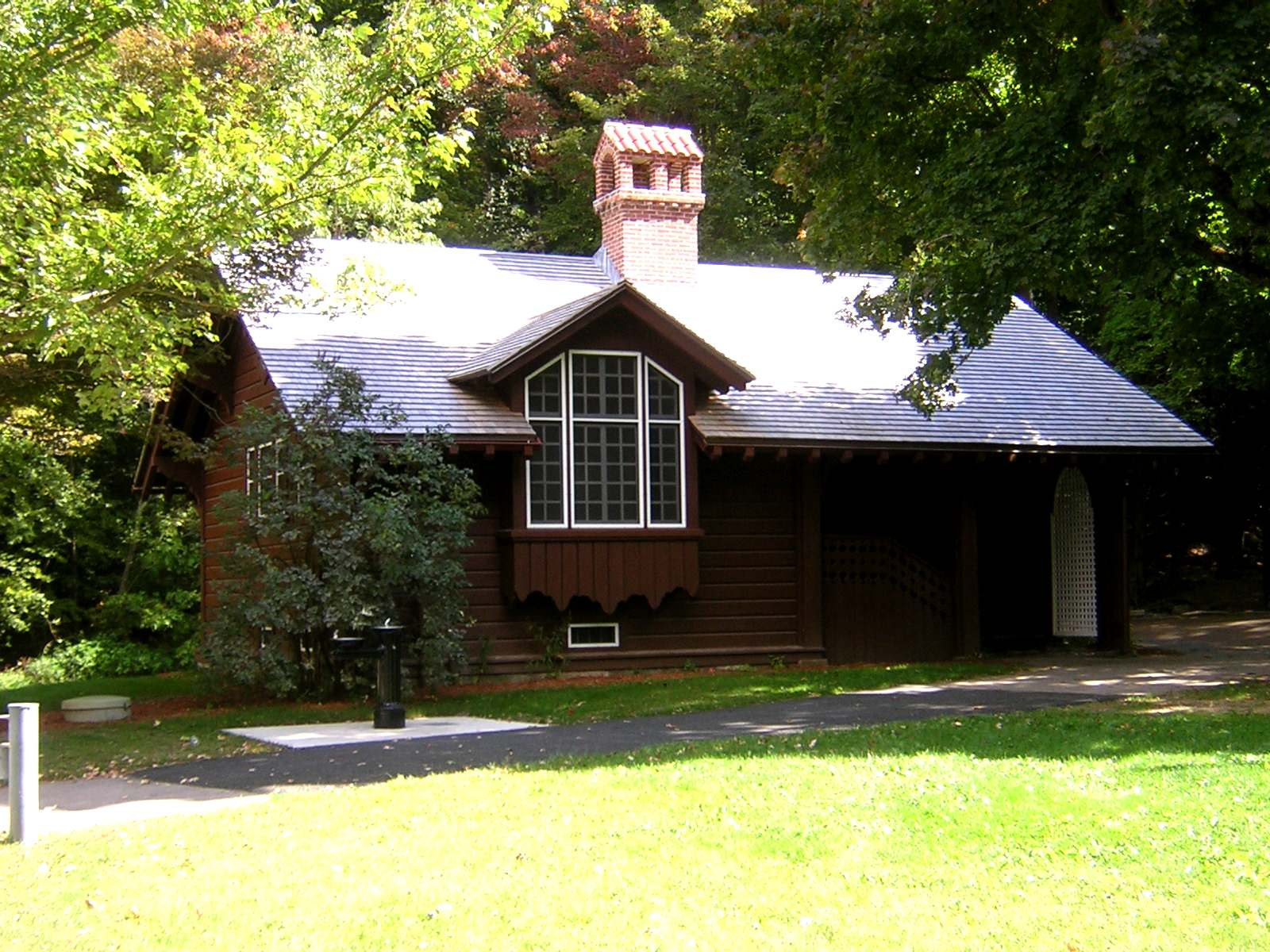
The Comfort Station (1904) in the Blue Hills Reservation, designed in the Swiss chalet style

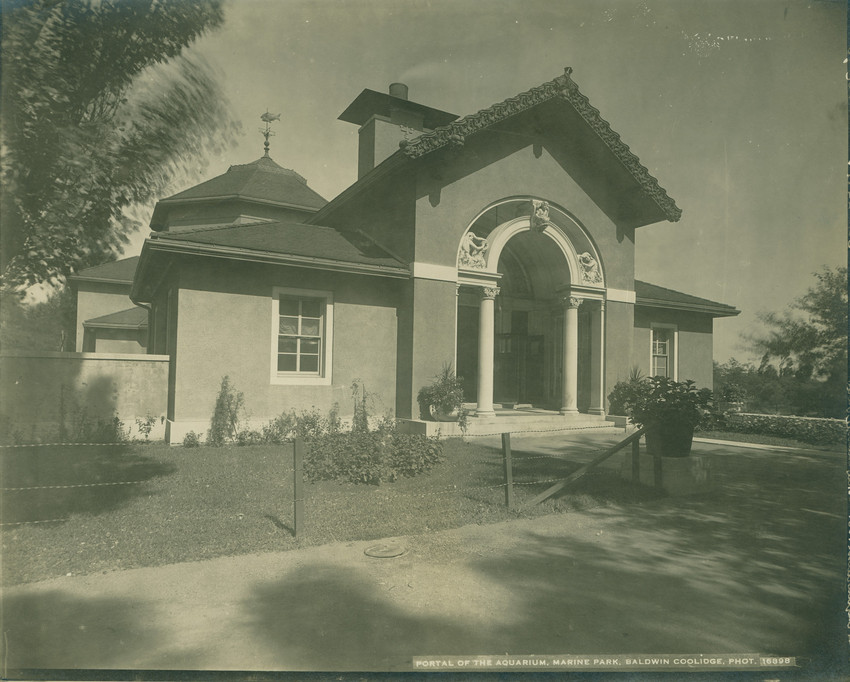
The South Boston Aquarium (1912, demolished), designed in the Renaissance Revival style

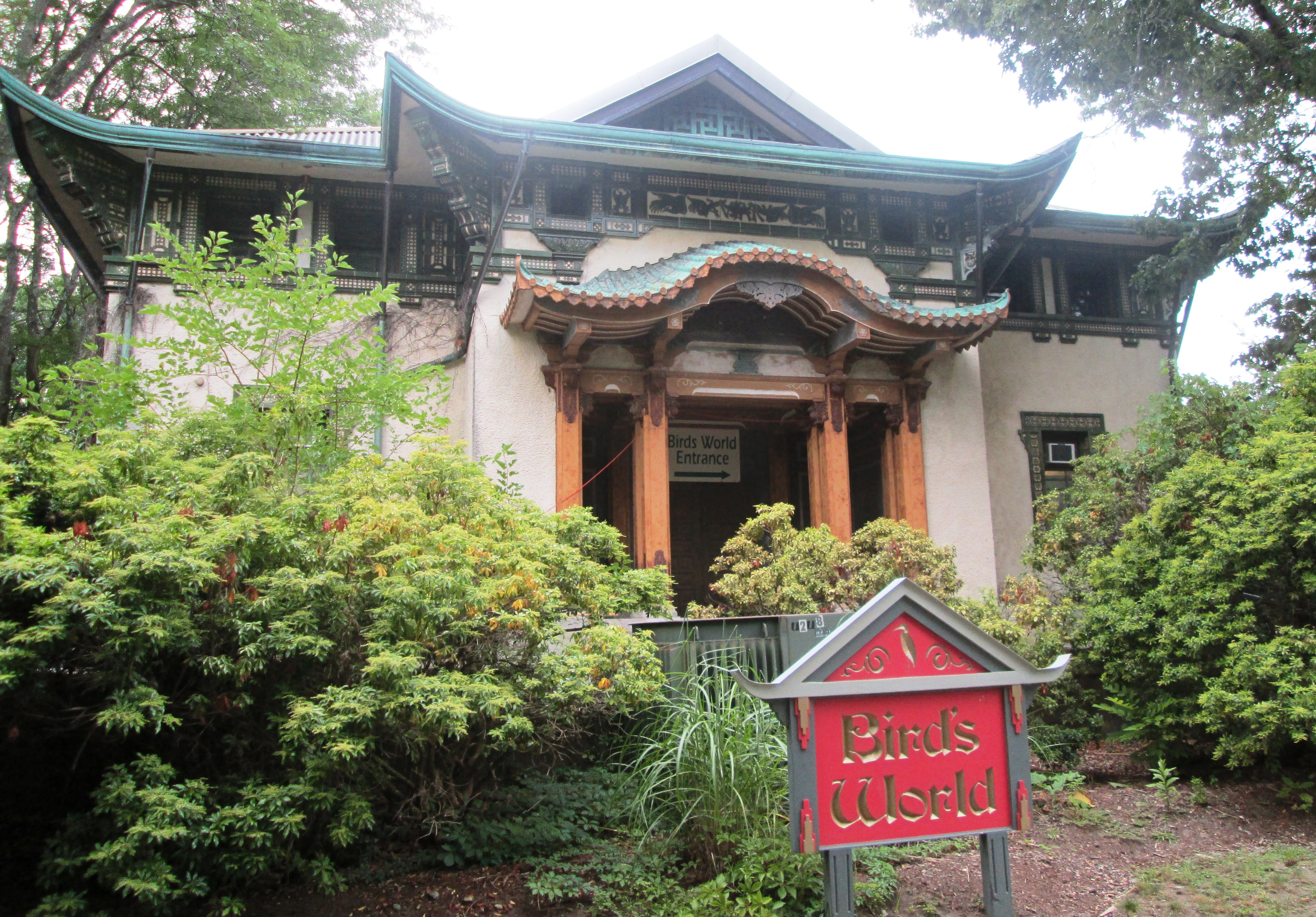
Bird's World (1913) at Franklin Park Zoo, designed in an eclectic Chinese style

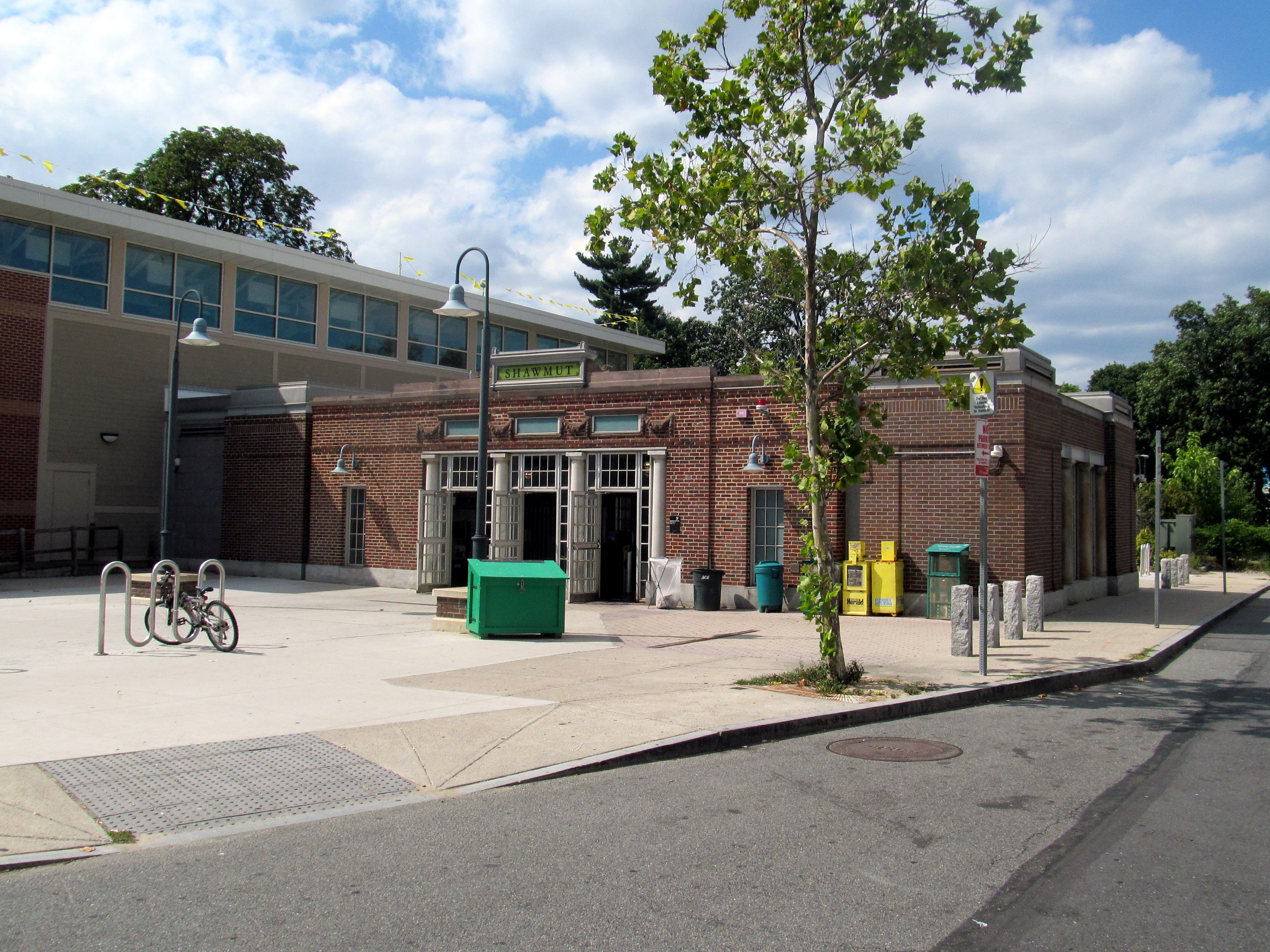
Shawmut station (1928) in Dorchester, designed in the Colonial Revival style

William D. Austin (May 15, 1856 – May 25, 1944) was an American architect and author. Austin practiced architecture in Boston from c. 1883 until his retirement in 1930. From c. 1890 to 1892 he worked in partnership with William E. Chamberlin; from then until c. 1900 he worked with Frederick W. Stickney. Austin is best remembered for the work he completed for the Metropolitan Park System of Greater Boston.

== Early life and professional career ==
William Downes Austin was born May 15, 1856, in Dorchester, Massachusetts, now annexed to Boston, to William Downes Austin Sr. and Catherine Downer Austin, née Austin. He was educated at the Massachusetts Institute of Technology (MIT), studying with the class of 1876 from 1872 to 1875. Listings in the Boston Directory indicate that Austin worked as a draftsman for Ware & Van Brunt from 1876 to 1880 and for Carl Fehmer in 1882 before beginning to practice independently c. 1883. By 1886 he had located at 6 Beacon Street, a building occupied by many architects including Chamberlin & Whidden, the partnership of William E. Chamberlin and William M. Whidden. Both overlapped with Austin at MIT: Chamberlin graduated as a member of the class of 1877; Whidden studied with that class in 1873–75.

In 1889 Whidden, who had moved to Portland, Oregon, to handle work for the firm, separated from Chamberlin to establish the firm of Whidden & Lewis; by 1890 Austin had joined Chamberlin to form Chamberlin & Austin. Their works include the Malden home of furniture manufacturer Albert H. Davenport (1892), founder of A. H. Davenport and Company. In March 1892, after Chamberlin's retirement, Austin and Frederick W. Stickney announced the formation of the firm of Stickney & Austin. Stickney too had attended MIT, studying with the class of 1875 in 1874–75. Initially operating from a single office in Lowell's Hildreth Building, a second office in Boston was announced in January 1893. The arrangement was such that Stickney managed the Lowell office while Austin managed the Boston office. It is not clear how design responsibilities were divided, especially for work outside of those two cities.

In the 1890s the firm was hired as architect for the recently established Metropolitan Park Commission, later the Metropolitan District Commission and a predecessor to the Department of Conservation and Recreation. For some twenty years, Austin embellished the commission's parks with park headquarters, boathouses, public toilets, stables, shelters and other buildings. Sometime after 1900 the partnership was dissolved, though Stickney and Austin kept both their names on their respective letterhead for years afterward. In addition to his work for the parks, during the 1920s Austin was responsible for the architectural work for stations of the Boston Elevated Railway, of these only Shawmut station (1928) is extant. He concluded his career with an administration building (1930, demolished) for what is now Logan International Airport. He retired to his home in Cambridge in 1930.

== Personal life ==
Austin was married in 1887 to Emily Wilder Barker; they had five children, including two sons and three daughters.

Austin was a Fellow of the American Institute of Architects (AIA) and a member and president of the Boston Society of Architects (BSA). In his retirement Austin wrote a never-published history of the BSA. Austin died May 26, 1943, in Cambridge at the age of 87. He was buried in Mount Auburn Cemetery.

== Architectural works ==
- 1895: Peirce School, Newton, Massachusetts
  - NRHP-listed
- 1897: Bathhouse, Revere Beach Reservation, Revere, Massachusetts
  - Demolished
- 1898: The Cambridge Homes, Cambridge, Massachusetts
- 1899: Administration building and police headquarters, Revere Beach Reservation, Revere, Massachusetts
  - Contributes to the NRHP-listed Revere Beach Reservation Historic District
- 1899: Charles River Reservation (Speedway)-Upper Basin Headquarters, Charles River Reservation, Brighton, Boston
  - NRHP-listed
- 1899: Metropolitan District Commission Stable, Blue Hills Reservation, Milton, Massachusetts
  - NRHP-listed
- 1901: Bathhouse, Nahant Beach Reservation, Nahant, Massachusetts
  - Demolished
- 1904: Blue Hills Headquarters, Blue Hills Reservation, Milton, Massachusetts
  - NRHP-listed
- 1904: Charles River Reservation headquarters, Newton, Massachusetts
  - As of 2026, occpied by Paddle Boston
- 1904: Comfort Station, Blue Hills Reservation, Milton, Massachusetts
  - NRHP-listed
- 1905: Arthur Holbrook Wellman house, Topsfield, Massachusetts
- 1907: Charlestown High School (former), Charlestown, Boston
- 1912: South Boston Aquarium, Marine Park, South Boston, Boston
  - Demolished
- 1913: Bird's World, Franklin Park Zoo, Boston
- 1913: Boathouse, Jamaica Pond, Jamaica Plain, Boston
- 1916: Riverway Studios, Boston
  - A studio building, tenants of which included William McGregor Paxton; then until 2022, the Wheelock College and Boston University Wheelock College of Education and Human Development library
- 1921: Feline House, Franklin Park Zoo, Boston
  - Demolished
- 1928: Shawmut station, Dorchester, Boston
- 1930: Administration building, Logan International Airport, East Boston, Boston
  - Demolished
