= South Boston Aquarium =

Public aquarium in Boston, Massachusetts

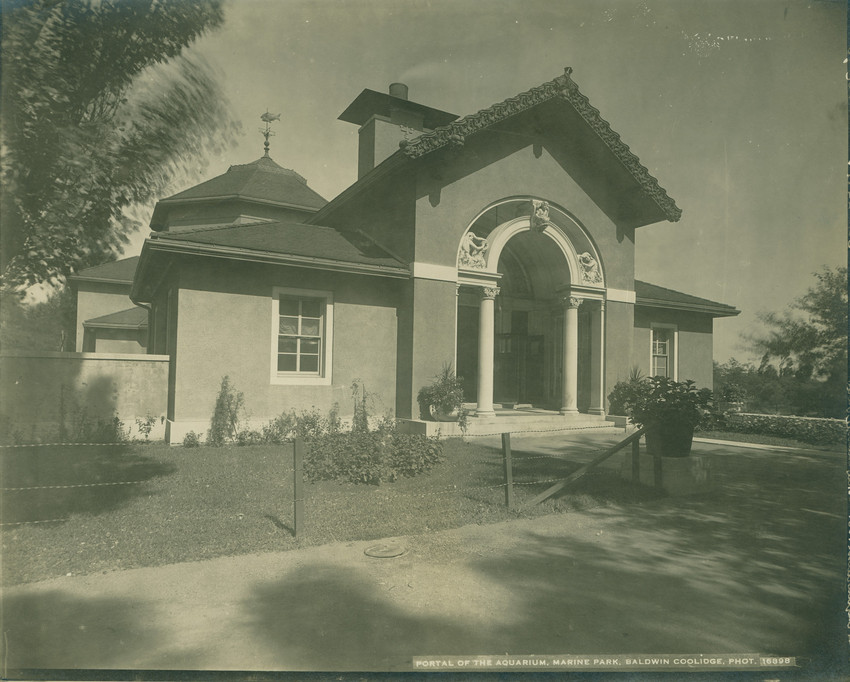
The entrance archway of the South Boston Aquarium in 1915.

The South Boston Aquarium was a public aquarium in Boston, Massachusetts.

== Previous Aquariums ==
Boston was one of the first cities in the U.S. to have a public aquarium in the form of the Boston Aquarial Gardens, also known as Cutting and Butler's Grand Aquaria, which opened on Bromfield Street adjacent to Boston Common in 1859. In addition to "learned" (trained) Atlantic harbor seals, curious Bostonians could view wood and glass tanks containing marine life kept alive by the oxygenation provided by aquatic plants and James Cutting's patented aerators, although both the water and glass were certainly less clear than in modern aquariums. The Aquarial Gardens existed in one form or another until P. T. Barnum closed the Barnum Aquarial Gardens on Washington Street in 1863.

== History ==
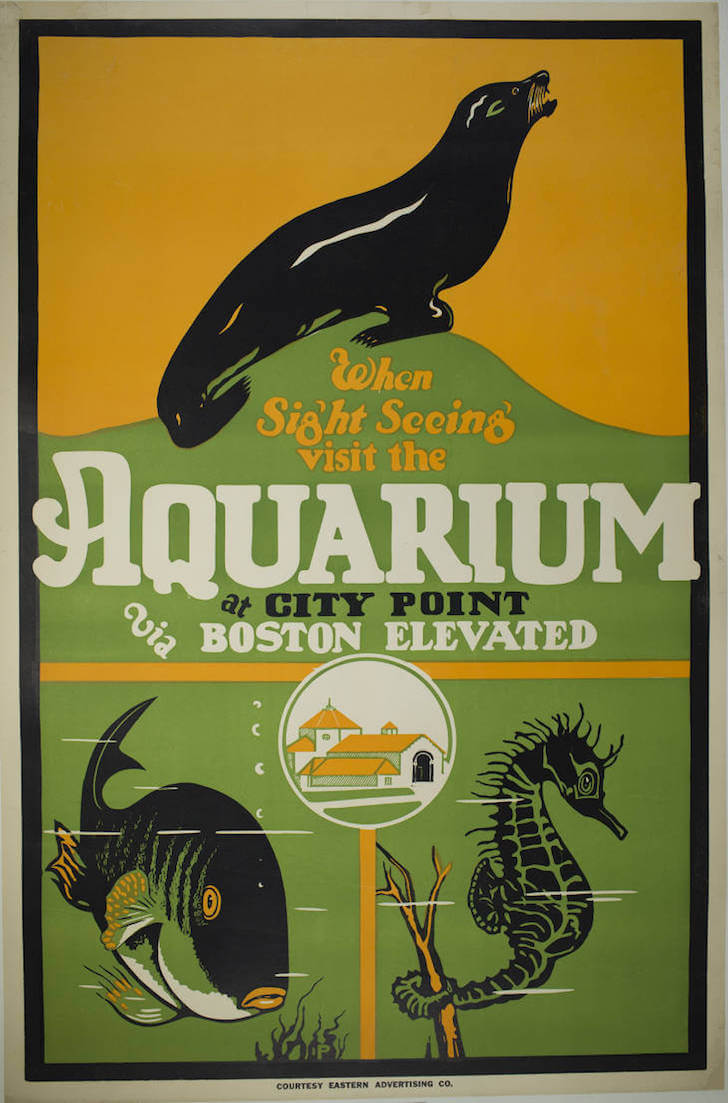
Advertisement for the South Boston Aquarium ca. 1915.

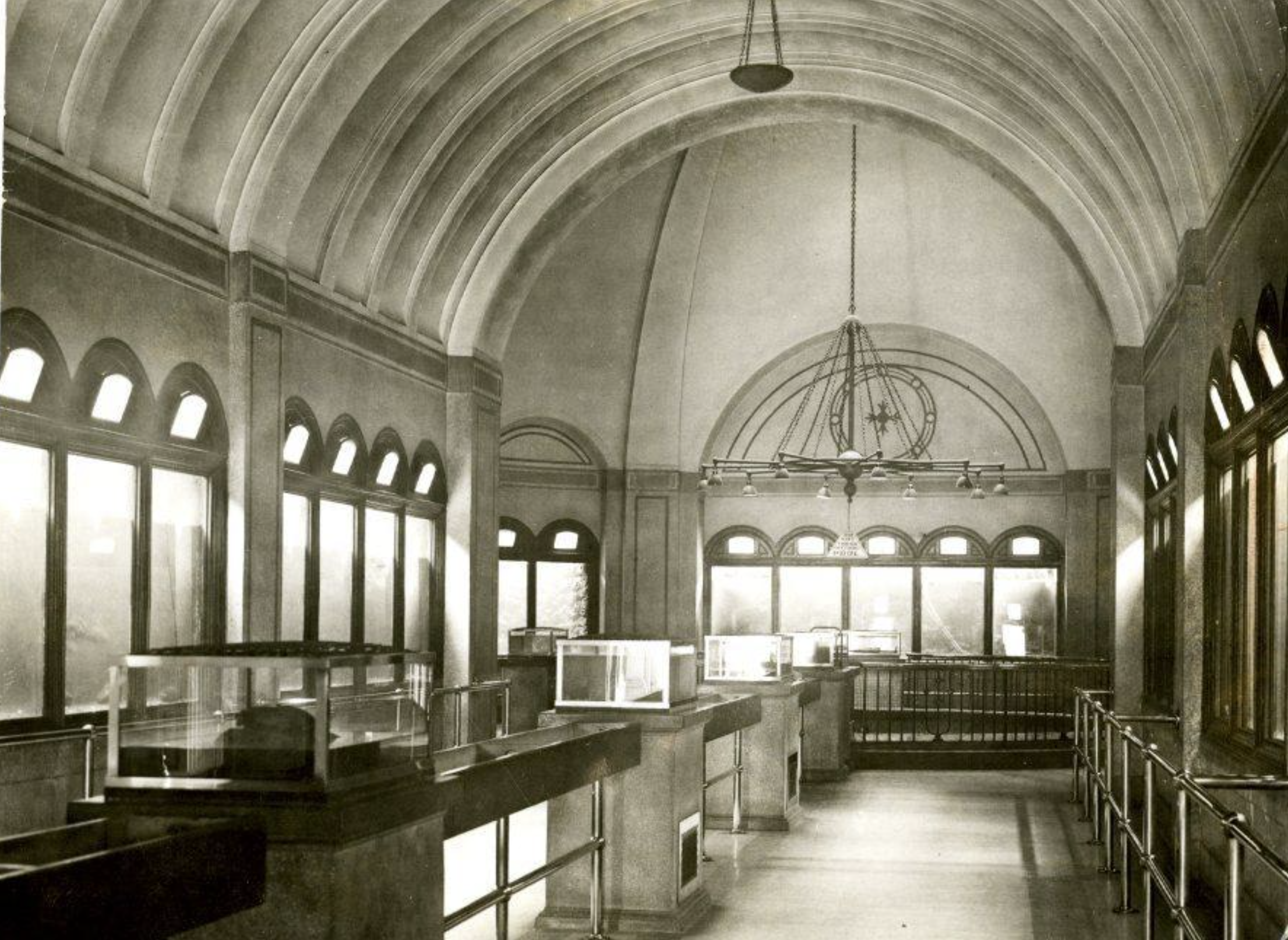
The interior of the South Boston Aquarium looking from the main gallery towards the central seal pool in 1921.

The aquarium was first proposed in the late nineteenth century by the Boston Society of Natural History as an attraction for the newly created Marine Park at City Point in South Boston. However, a lack of funds after the construction of the park prevented the City of Boston from building the aquarium until 1912. The architect, William Downes Austin, had also designed the Detroit Aquarium. The building encompassed 8,000 square feet (740 m^{2}) of land, and the total cost came to $135,778 ($3,943,835 in 2021). It was developed alongside the Franklin Park Zoo, and both were administered by the Parks Department.

Originally intended to be cruciform-shaped like a church with a central nave and two apses, the aquarium building was ultimately L-shaped without the west apse. A bronze weathervane in the shape of a cod topped the domed nave. Inside, from behind brass railings, visitors could view 55 wooden tanks, lit by natural sunlight during the day and electricity after dark, through plate glass windows. A large pool for Atlantic harbor seals and California sea lions, with a chandelier hanging overhead, occupied the area under the dome, and the gallery of smaller tanks exhibited saltwater and freshwater fishes and turtles. The freshwater exhibits were supplied by city water, while a reservoir of seawater pumped in from Boston Harbor supplied the saltwater exhibits.

The aquarium, which reportedly had an annual attendance of 300,000 (and more than 15,000 visitors on its first day alone), was popular, and admission was free. Unlike at previous aquariums in Boston, there was a concerted effort to present animals to visitors in naturalistic exhibits. The exhibits were populated with specimens obtained from other aquariums or on staff collecting trips to the Caribbean. Behind the scenes, as had occurred between Cutting and Butler, there was tension between the curators, who wanted to be seen as a scientific institution, and management, who prioritized drawing crowds. Ultimately, the Great Depression and World War II forced the City of Boston to reallocate most of the aquarium's funding, and Mayor John Hynes finally ordered the neglected facility closed on September 30, 1954, and the remaining animals sent to other institutions. A tennis court now stands on the former site of the aquarium.

The idea of a public aquarium in Boston would remain popular, and a new, privately owned aquarium, the New England Aquarium, would open in 1969.

== In media ==
In For the Union Dead (1964), Pulitzer Prize-winning poet and Boston native Robert Lowell describes the abandoned South Boston Aquarium, which stood adjacent to a still-standing statue of Civil War admiral David Farragut:

The old South Boston Aquarium stands

in a Sahara of snow now. Its broken windows are boarded.

The bronze weathervane cod has lost half its scales.

The airy tanks are dry.

== See also ==
- Boston Aquarial Gardens
- New England Aquarium
- Franklin Park Zoo
