= Ellisville, Massachusetts =

Village in Massachusetts, United States

Coordinates: 41°50′40″N 70°32′32″W

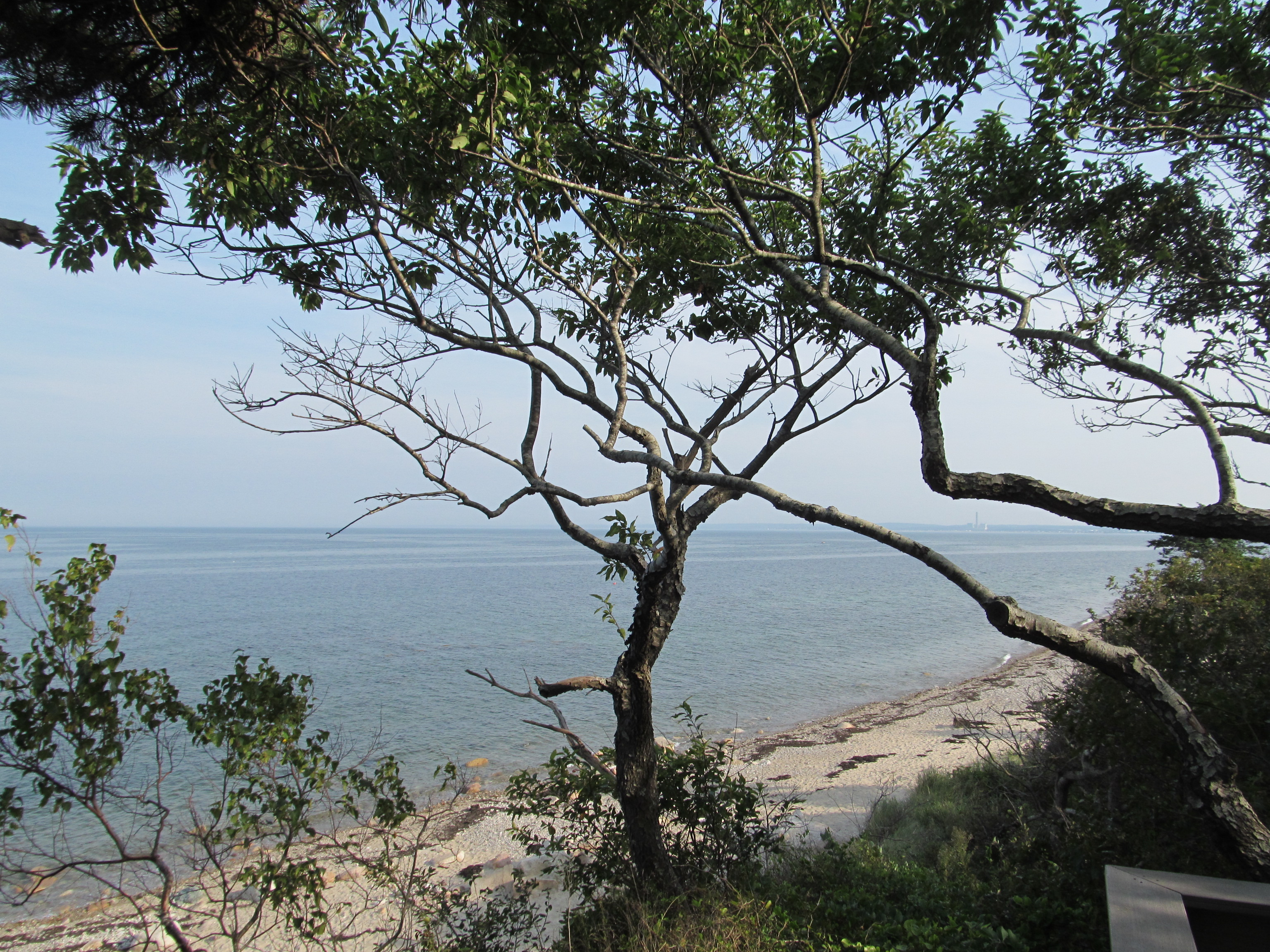
Ellisville Harbor State Park

Ellisville is a village in southeastern Plymouth, Massachusetts, United States. It is located on Cape Cod Bay, and is situated south of Vallerville and north of Cedarville. The neighborhoods within Ellisville include Harlow's Landing and Eastland Heights. Ellisville Harbor State Park, in the northern part of the village, has a natural harbor and beach.

Ellisville is named after the original owner of the property, Lt. John Ellis, who commanded the town of Sandwich militia. It is believed that he was a victim of an ambush during King Philip's War.

== See also ==
- Neighborhoods in Plymouth, Massachusetts
