= Charles River Speedway =

Former bicycle and harness racing track in Massachusetts, US

Coordinates: 42°21′58.22″N 71°8′3.82″W

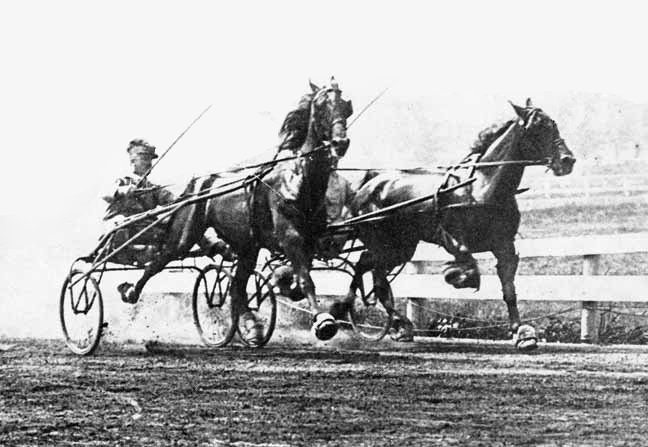
H.B. Ralston driving at the speedway

The Charles River Speedway was a former bicycle and harness racing track located in Allston, Massachusetts, which has been redeveloped into an upscale market.

== History ==
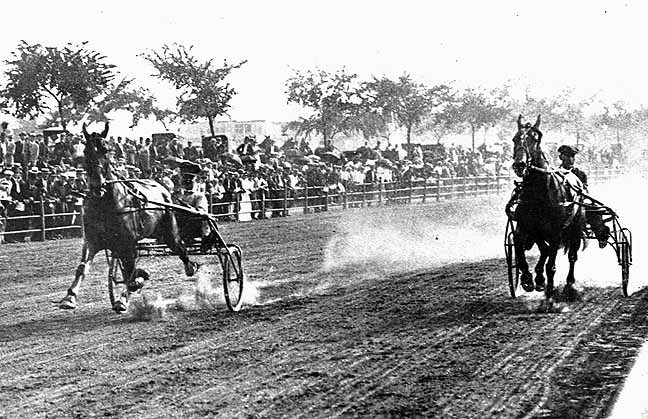
Race at the Charles River Speedway

The speedway itself was constructed in 1899 along the Charles River. It began around Market and Arsenal Street and extended all the way to the Harvard Stadium. It was designed by a firm co-founded by Frederick Law Olmsted.

One of the functions of the speedway was to move the racing of horses and other pleasurable activities off of Brighton Road (now Commonwealth Avenue) west of Kenmore Square and Beacon Street in Brookline. As traffic on the roads increased, it became necessary to build the speedway.

Amenities to the facility included a bicycle racing course, a 1 mile (1.6 km) long race course, a 1.75 miles (2.82 km) driveway, and use of the original Soldiers Field Road. At some point, the track was shortened to an oval around where the center of the original track now stands and use ended in the 1960s.

One of the bigger events at the speedway occurred on October 13, 1930 when a new course speed record was set. After seven hours of competition, which was viewed by thousands of spectators, a time of 2:05.5 was set for the 1 mile (1.6 km) race. The horse team was driven by a Mr. Grattan, the pacer of Mrs. Charles F. Adams.

Only the superintendent's building (Charles River Reservation (Speedway)-Upper Basin Headquarters) remains today. It was listed on the National Register of Historic Places. The building was even listed on the National Register of Historic Places featured properties and districts list on July 30, 2010. Additionally, it was listed on July 19 of that year. At some point before 1941, the building itself was turned into a police substation for the Boston Police Department.

In 2021, the site was redeveloped as an upscale marketplace and community gathering spot, including a microbrewery.

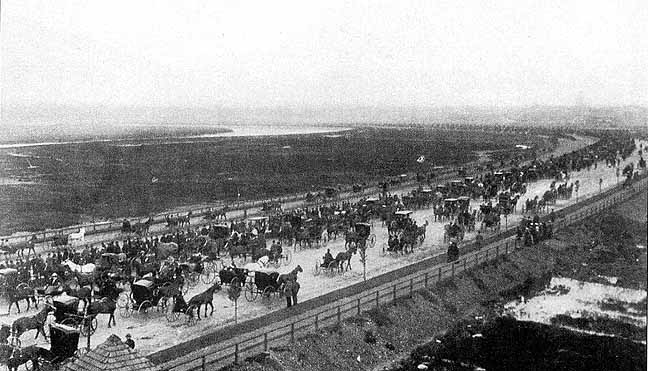
1902 Third Annual Speedway Parade near the Superintendent's Building
