= Charles River Reservation (Speedway)-Upper Basin Headquarters =

- Charles River Reservation – Upper Basin Headquarters
- U.S. National Register of Historic Places
- Boston Landmark
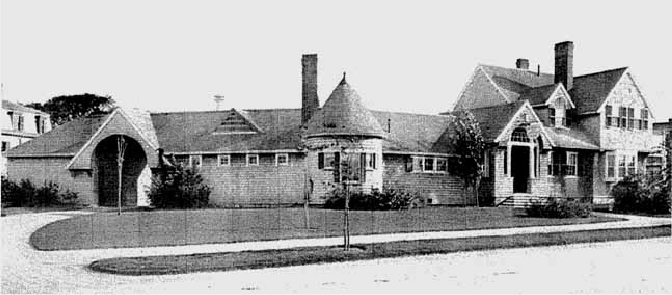
- View of the headquarters, c. 1900

- Location within Greater Boston area Location within Massachusetts Location within the United States
- Location: 525 Western Avenue, Boston, Massachusetts
- Coordinates: 42°21′43.3″N 71°8′43.2″W
- Built: 1899-1940
- Architect: William D. Austin
- Architectural style: Shingle and Colonial Revival
- NRHP reference No.: 10000506

Significant dates
- Added to NRHP: July 19, 2010
- Designated BOSL: April 23, 2013

The Charles River Reservation (Speedway)-Upper Basin Headquarters (Speedway Headquarters) is located at the corner of Western Avenue and Soldiers Field Road in the Brighton neighborhood of Boston, Massachusetts. It is a complex of seven buildings designed by architect William D. Austin in the Shingle and Colonial Revival styles and built between 1899 and 1940. The site served as the headquarters of the State-managed Charles River Reservation and as horse stables for the Charles River Speedway, a harness and bicycle racing track along present-day Soldiers Field Road. The Massachusetts Department of Conservation and Recreation (DCR) owns the Speedway Headquarters and considers it to be one of its origin properties.

Vacant since 2005, the property was redeveloped as a mixed-use commercial and cultural facility beginning in 2019 under DCR's Historic Curatorship Program by the Boston-based Architectural Heritage Foundation. The Speedway opened in 2021.

== Architecture ==
The Speedway Headquarters was designed by local architect William D. Austin, known for his work on public buildings throughout Massachusetts, particularly in state parks and reservations. The complex consists of seven contiguous buildings arranged in a triangle around a courtyard. The buildings exhibit many features common to Shingle-style structures - wood shingle siding, an irregular roofline with cross-gables, turrets, and wide eaves - but also includes windows, shutters, and a portico with columns characteristic of Colonial Revival architecture.

== History ==
The Speedway and its surrounding area were designed by landscape architect Charles Eliot shortly before his death in 1897, and its construction was overseen by the Olmsted Brothers. The Speedway operated until at least the 1950s, and was eventually absorbed by the expansion of Soldiers Field Road into a limited-access parkway. The buildings of the Speedway headquarters continued to be used by the Massachusetts Water Resources Authority for administrative and logistical purposes, through at least 2001.

The buildings were listed on the National Register of Historic Places on July 19, 2010, and as a Boston Landmark in 2014. The complex was vacant at that time.

In April 2013 the Boston Landmarks Commission voted to designate the Charles River Speedway Administration Building as a Boston Landmark. The designation was subsequently approved by the Mayor and by City Council.

== Redevelopment ==
In May 2013 the Department of Conservation and Recreation (DCR) announced a request for proposals from outside parties to rehabilitate, reuse, and maintain the Charles River Reservation Speedway Administration Building. The project was to be undertaken under the purview of the Historic Curatorship Program.

In August 2014, the DCR announced that a proposal submitted by the non-profit Architectural Heritage Foundation and its for-profit partner, 243 Dutton Interests LLC, had been selected for a forty-year lease of the property. The chosen proposal was to turn the run-down complex into a brewery/taproom, restaurant, maker space and retail shops for local artisans, and office space for a Brighton-based nonprofit. Initially, the proposal also included the construction of a multi-family housing unit in place of the adjacent 501-507 Western Ave. However, that plan was cancelled and AHF became the sole developer. The building on the site proposed for housing was demolished and became a car and bicycle parking lot for Speedway users.

Rehabilitation of the complex began in 2019. The first tenant, Notch Brewing, opened in July 2021.
