= Ellisville Harbor State Park =

State park in Plymouth County, Massachusetts

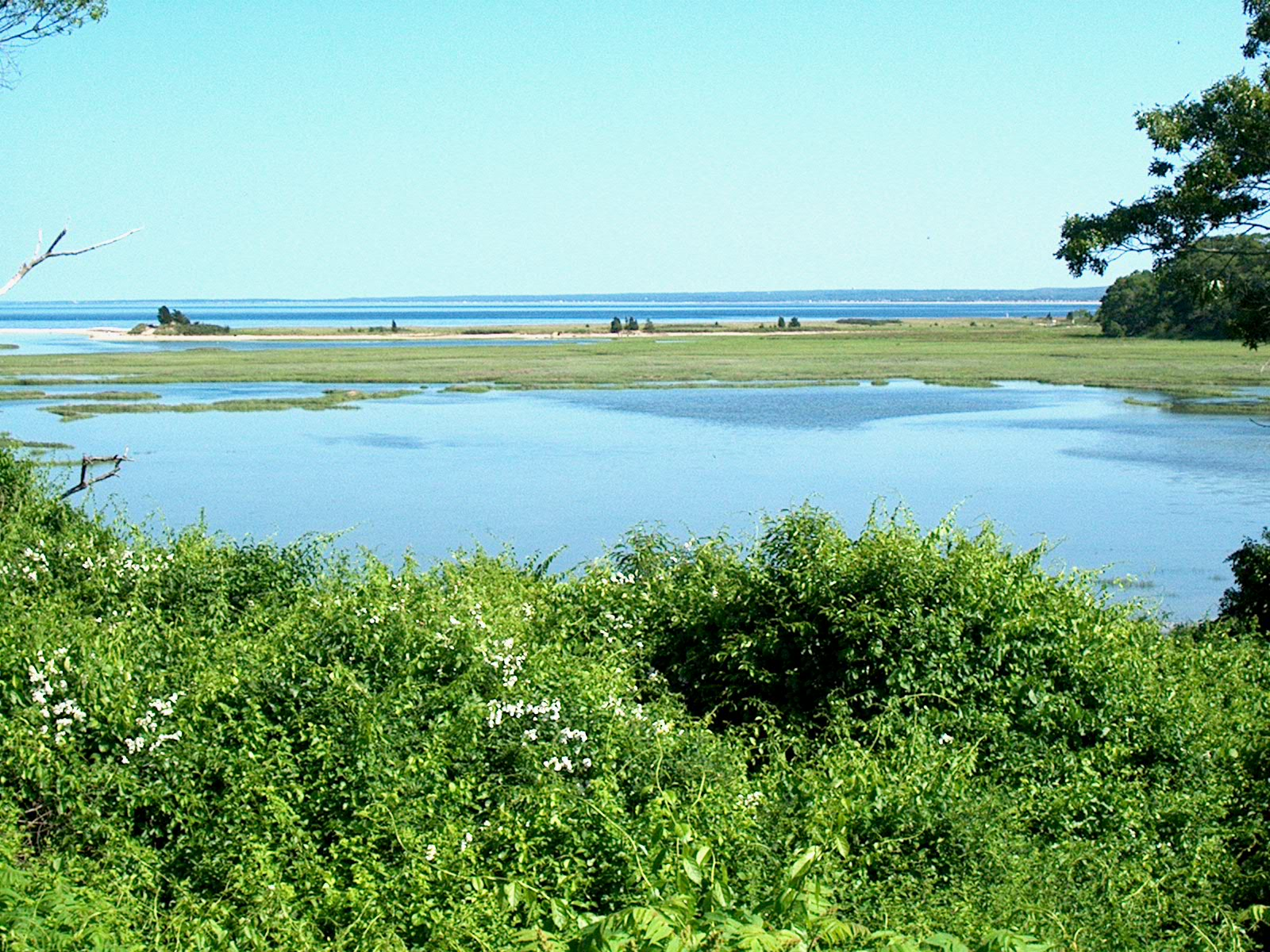

- Location within Massachusetts Location within the United States
- Location: Ellisville, Massachusetts, United States
- Coordinates: 41°50′25″N 70°32′08″W
- Area: 97 acres (39 ha)
- Elevation: 7 ft (2.1 m)
- Established: 1991
- Administrator: Massachusetts Department of Conservation and Recreation
- Website: Official website

Ellisville Harbor State Park is a nature preserve and public recreation area located in the village of Ellisville, Massachusetts, United States, on the western shore of Cape Cod Bay. Natural features of the coastal property include a barrier beach, sphagnum bog, salt marsh, rolling meadows, and red pine forest habitats. Scenic features include views of the South Shore coastline, small fishing boats, harbor seals seen offshore during fall and winter, and birds attracted to the park's bog as both habitat and migration stopover. The state park is managed by the Department of Conservation and Recreation.

== History ==
Between 2,500 and 5,000 years ago, prehistoric Native Americans hunted, fished, harvested shellfish, and made tools here. An area of approximately 600 acres (240 ha), which includes at least two Native American sites, was designated an Area of Critical Environmental Concern (ACEC) in 1980. The state acquired 100 acres (40 ha) of the ACEC to create the state park in 1991. In its earlier days, the harbor was a busy loading spot for ships taking timber to Boston and for local fishing. The park's reproduction colonial farmstead/tavern property is part of the Department of Conservation and Recreation's Historic Curatorship Program.

== Activities and amenities ==
The park offers opportunities for fishing, hiking, cross-country skiing, and beachcombing. A wide main trail of about 350 yards is maintained with a processed stone surface from a parking area to a wide, rocky beach. The endangered piping plovers and least terns nest along a section of the beach which is closed in the spring. Several side trails where poison ivy may cling to trail edges access other areas of the park.
