= Carlisle, Massachusetts =

- Town
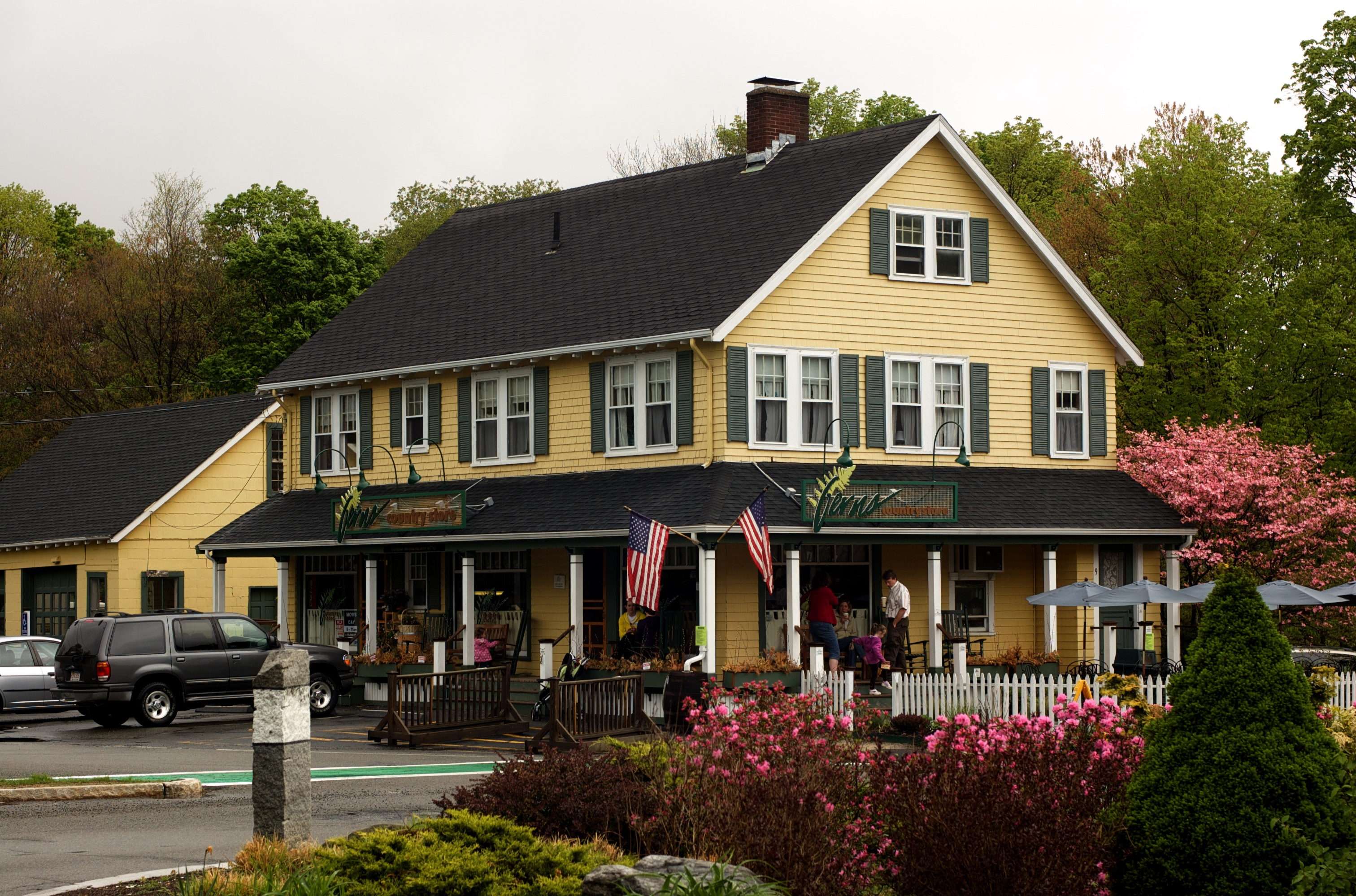
- Downtown Carlisle in 2009

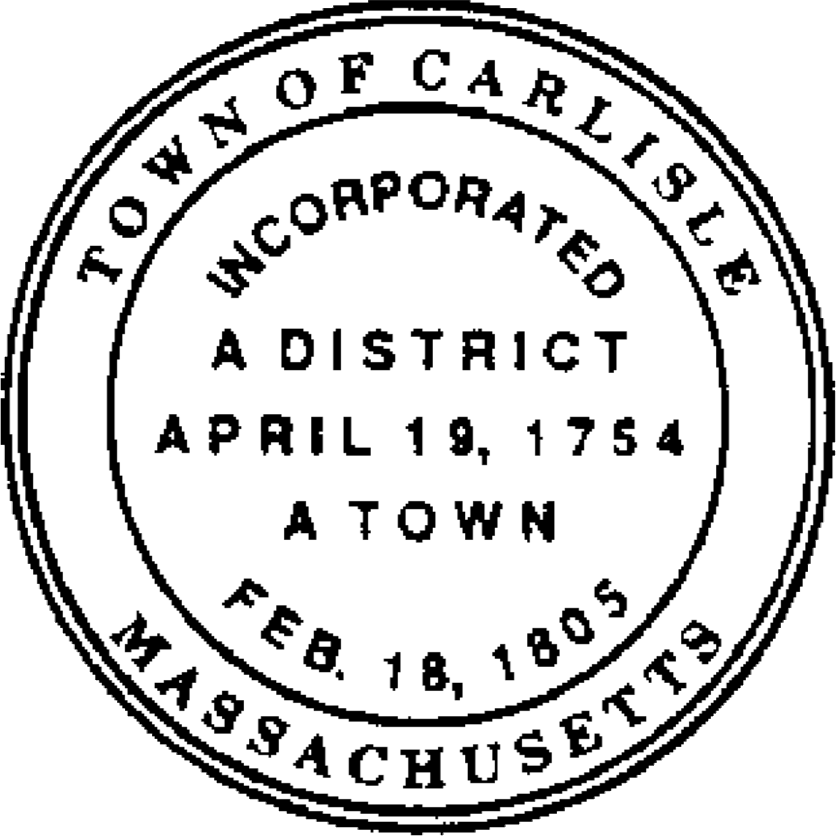
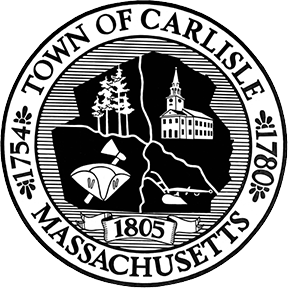
- Seal Logo

- Location in Middlesex County in Massachusetts
- Coordinates: 42°31′45″N 71°21′00″W
- Country: United States
- State: Massachusetts
- County: Middlesex
- Settled: 1651
- Incorporated: 1805

Government
  - Town Administrator: Ryan McLane

Area
  - Total: 15.5 sq mi (40.2 km^{2})
  - Land: 15.4 sq mi (39.8 km^{2})
  - Water: 0.15 sq mi (0.4 km^{2})
- Elevation: 203 ft (62 m)

Population (2020)
  - Total: 5,237
  - Density: 341/sq mi (131.6/km^{2})
- Time zone: UTC-5 (Eastern)
  - Summer (DST): UTC-4 (Eastern)
- ZIP code: 01741
- Area code: 351 / 978
- FIPS code: 25-11525
- GNIS feature ID: 0619397
- Website: www.carlislema.gov

Carlisle is a town located northwest of Boston in Middlesex County, Massachusetts, United States. As of the 2020 U.S. census, the town had a population of 5,237.

== History ==
English colonists first settled the area now incorporated as the town of Carlisle in 1651, on parcels of lands of the neighboring towns of Acton, Billerica, Chelmsford and Concord. Carlisle became a district of Concord in 1780 and was incorporated as a town by an act of the legislature in 1805. The town was named for Carlisle, England, the hometown of one of Carlisle's earliest settlers, James Adams.

== Amenities and culture ==
Carlisle contains a library, a book store, a dentist's office, a school (Carlisle Public School) and an auto body shop. There are two ice cream stores: one of the four branches of Kimball Farm, and Great Brook Farm State Park which is home to the first robotic milking system in Massachusetts and serves ice cream made from the farm's milk. Great Brook Farm is also the site of a cross-country ski-touring center. The Castle Playground, next to the Carlisle Public School, was built by community volunteers in 1988. In 2022, a committee of parents and educators led a volunteer effort to replace it with a new, accessible structure that includes musical and educational features.

The Carlisle Mosquito has appeared as the weekly independent newspaper of the town since 1972; it is a non-profit publication distributed free to all town residents.

The Gleason Public Library is one of the 36 libraries in the Merrimack Valley Library Consortium; its building also contains a seismograph. Cultural organizations include the Carlisle Chamber Orchestra, the Carlisle Community Chorus, and the Savoyard Light Opera Company.

Carlisle Old Home Day has been held for over 100 years on the weekend prior to the Fourth of July as a free public event with family-friendly games and activities.

Ferns Country Store, at 8 Lowell Street, has been site of a store dating to 1844. In 2007, the Retailers Association of Massachusetts named it Retailer of the Year. It served as the village-center general store until closing in 2025, though efforts to reopen it are underway as of 2026.

Until 2012, the town was also home to the Blue Jay Recording Studio, where artists such as the Platters, Aerosmith, Aimee Mann, Amy Grant, Alice Cooper, Boston, John Williams and the Boston Pops, Buckwheat Zydeco, Billy Joel, Lauryn Hill, Rihanna, Roy Orbison, k. d. lang, Pat Metheny, Yo Yo Ma, Carly Simon, the Pussycat Dolls, Genesis and Lady Gaga recorded.

== Geography ==
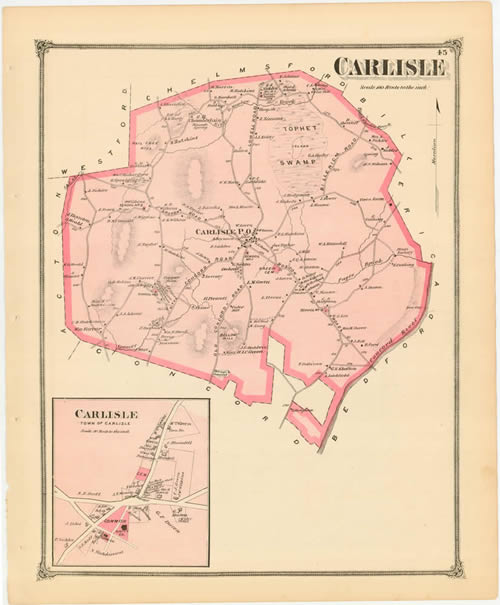
An 1875 map of Carlisle

Carlisle is located about 8 miles (13 km) south-southwest of Lowell and 19 miles (31 km) northwest of Boston. It borders the towns of Concord, Acton, Westford, Chelmsford, Billerica, and Bedford.

According to the United States Census Bureau, the town has a total area of 15.5 square miles (40 km^{2}), of which 15.4 square miles (40 km^{2}) is land and 0.2 square miles (0.52 km^{2}) (1.09%) is water.

Conservation land makes up about a quarter of the town's area. Besides town-owned land overseen by the town's Conservation Committee, Carlisle is home to the Carlisle Conservation Foundation, Great Brook Farm State Park, and a portion of the Great Meadows National Wildlife Refuge neighboring the Concord River.

Historical population
Year	Pop.	±%
1790	555	—
1850	632	+13.9%
1860	621	−1.7%
1870	569	−8.4%
1880	478	−16.0%
1890	481	+0.6%
1900	480	−0.2%
1910	551	+14.8%
1920	463	−16.0%
1930	560	+21.0%
1940	747	+33.4%
1950	876	+17.3%
1960	1,488	+69.9%
1970	2,871	+92.9%
1980	3,306	+15.2%
1990	4,333	+31.1%
2000	4,717	+8.9%
2010	4,852	+2.9%
2020	5,237	+7.9%
2022*	5,157	−1.5%
* = population estimate. Source: United States census records and Population Estimates Program data.

== Demographics ==
As of the census of 2000, there were 4,717 people, 1,618 households, and 1,372 families residing in the town. The population density was 307.1 inhabitants per square mile (118.6/km^{2}). There were 1,655 housing units at an average density of 107.7 per square mile (41.6/km^{2}). Carlisle maintains a minimum 2-acre (8,100 m^{2}) zoning law on new development. The racial makeup of the town was 93.47% White, 0.17% African American, 0.06% Native American, 4.69% Asian, 0.04% Pacific Islander, 0.13% from other races, and 1.29% from two or more races. Hispanic or Latino of any race were 1.19% of the population.

There were 1,618 households, out of which 46.4% had children under the age of 18 living with them, 78.6% were married couples living together, 4.7% had a female householder with no husband present, and 15.2% were non-families. 11.4% of all households were made up of individuals, and 4.9% had someone living alone who was 65 years of age or older. The average household size was 2.92 and the average family size was 3.18. The population had a distributed age profile, with 30.6% under the age of 18, 3.4% from 18 to 24, 23.3% from 25 to 44, 34.3% from 45 to 64, and 8.4% who were 65 years of age or older. The median age was 42 years. For every 100 females, there were 98.3 males. For every 100 females age 18 and over, there were 96.4 males.

The median income for a household in the town was $176,228, while average household income was $244,544; the per capita income was $87,470.

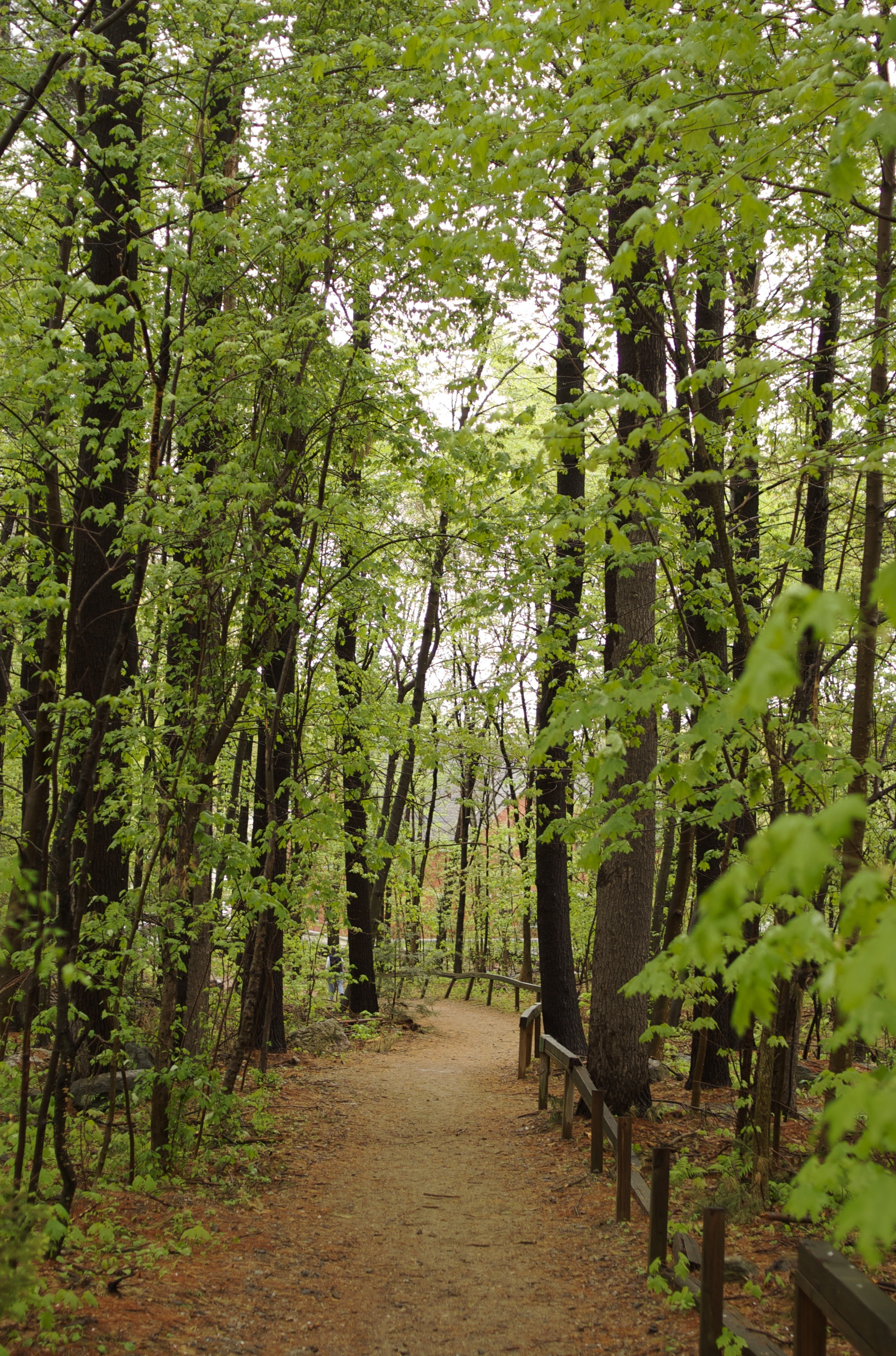
The path between the school and library

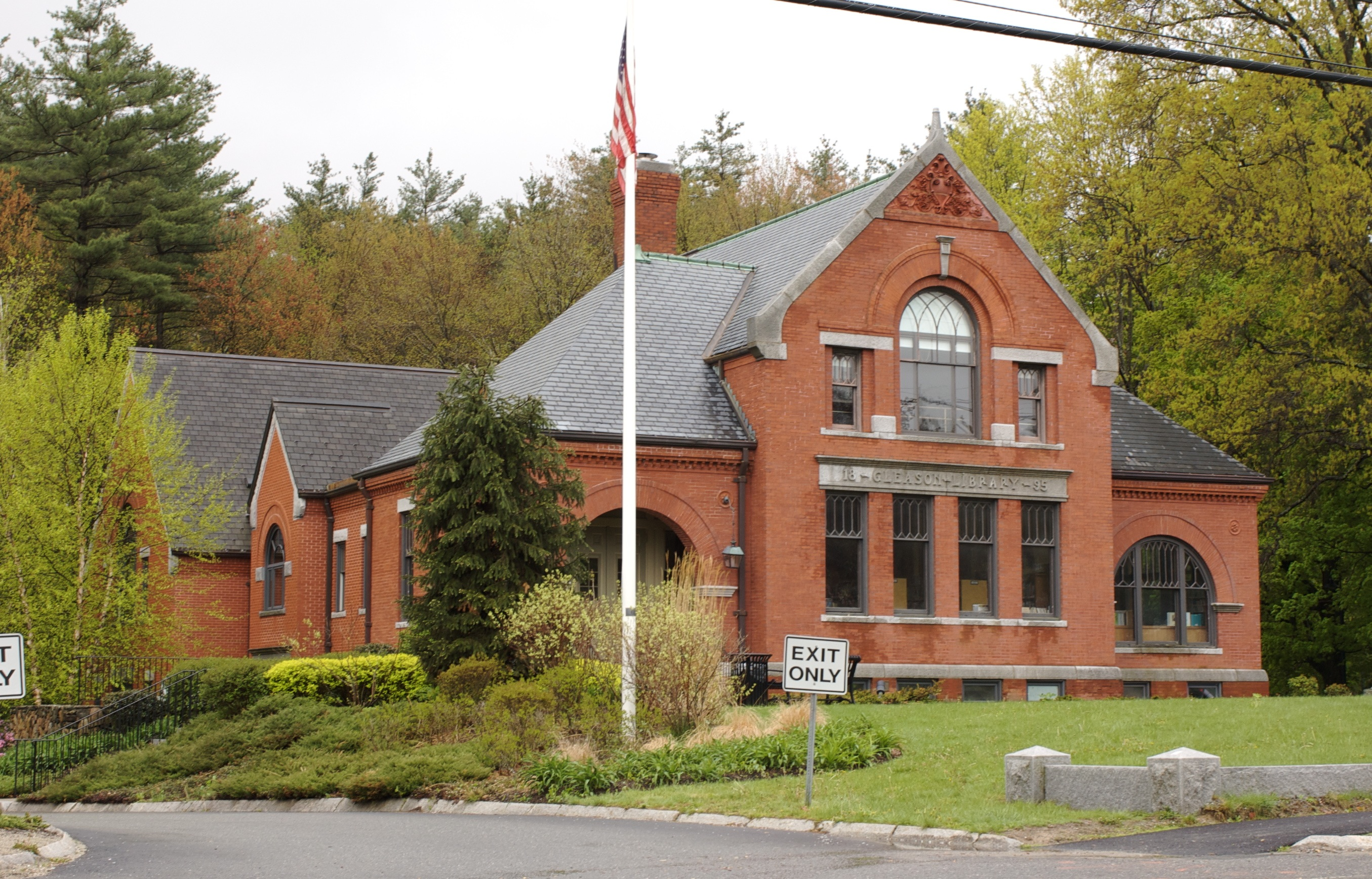
Gleason Public Library

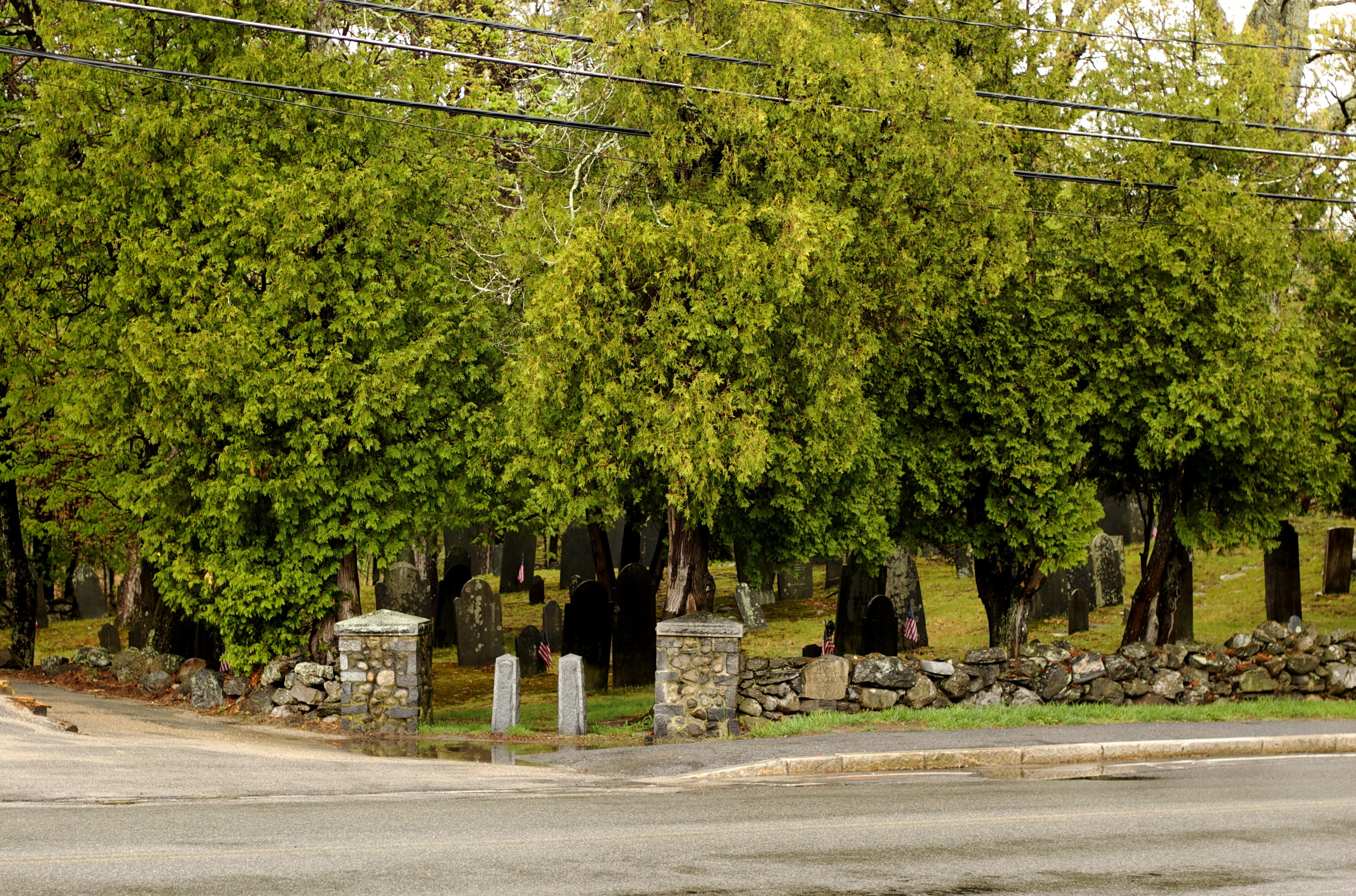
The Old Burying Ground in the center of town

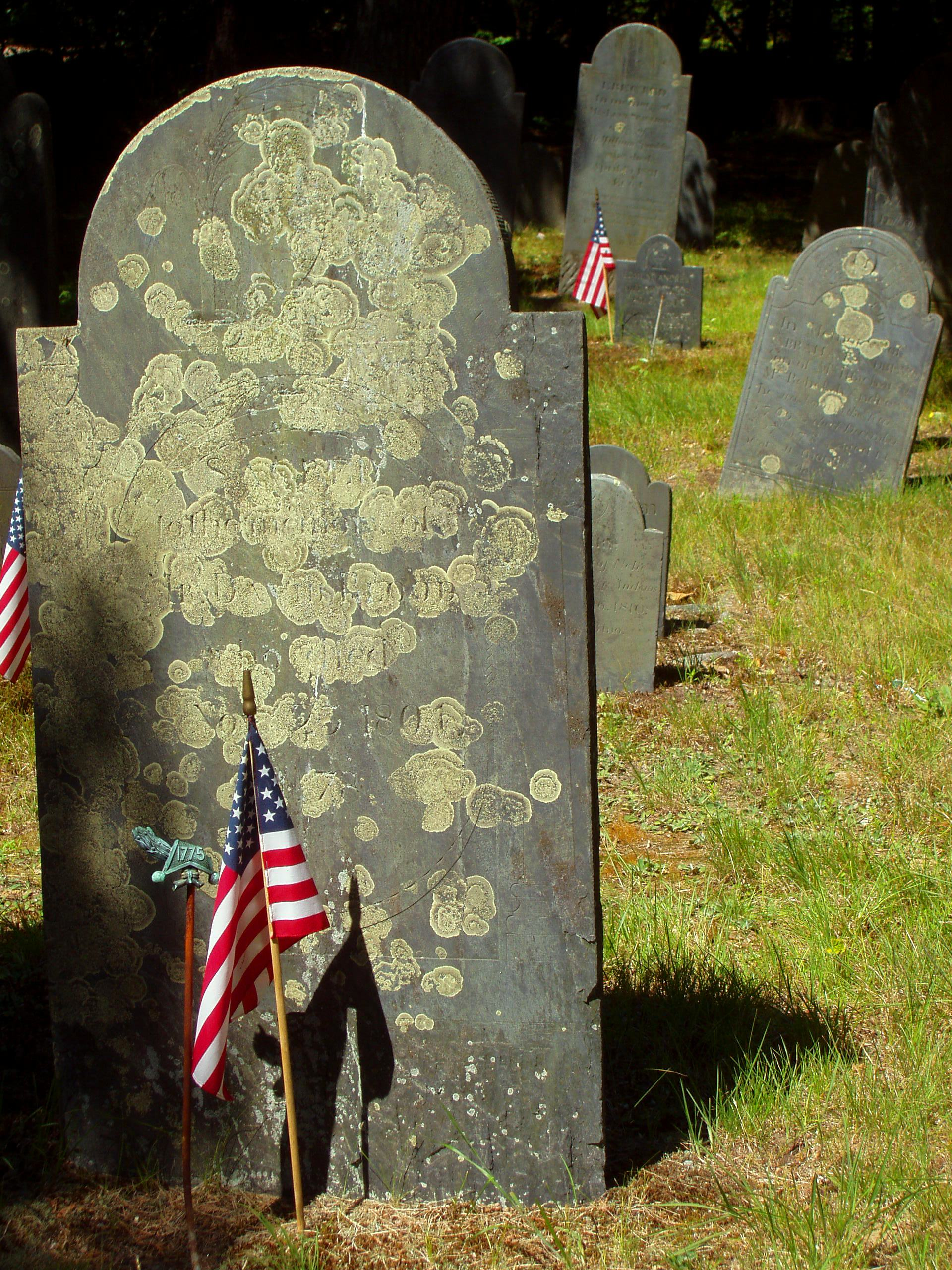
Graves in the Green Cemetery

== Notable people ==
- John Berman, journalist and CNN anchor
- Sean Bielat, businessman and two time Republican candidate for United States Congress in Massachusetts's 4th congressional district
- Clairo, musician and recording artist moved to Carlisle with her family when she was 10.
