= Great Brook Farm State Park =

State park in Carlisle, Massachusetts

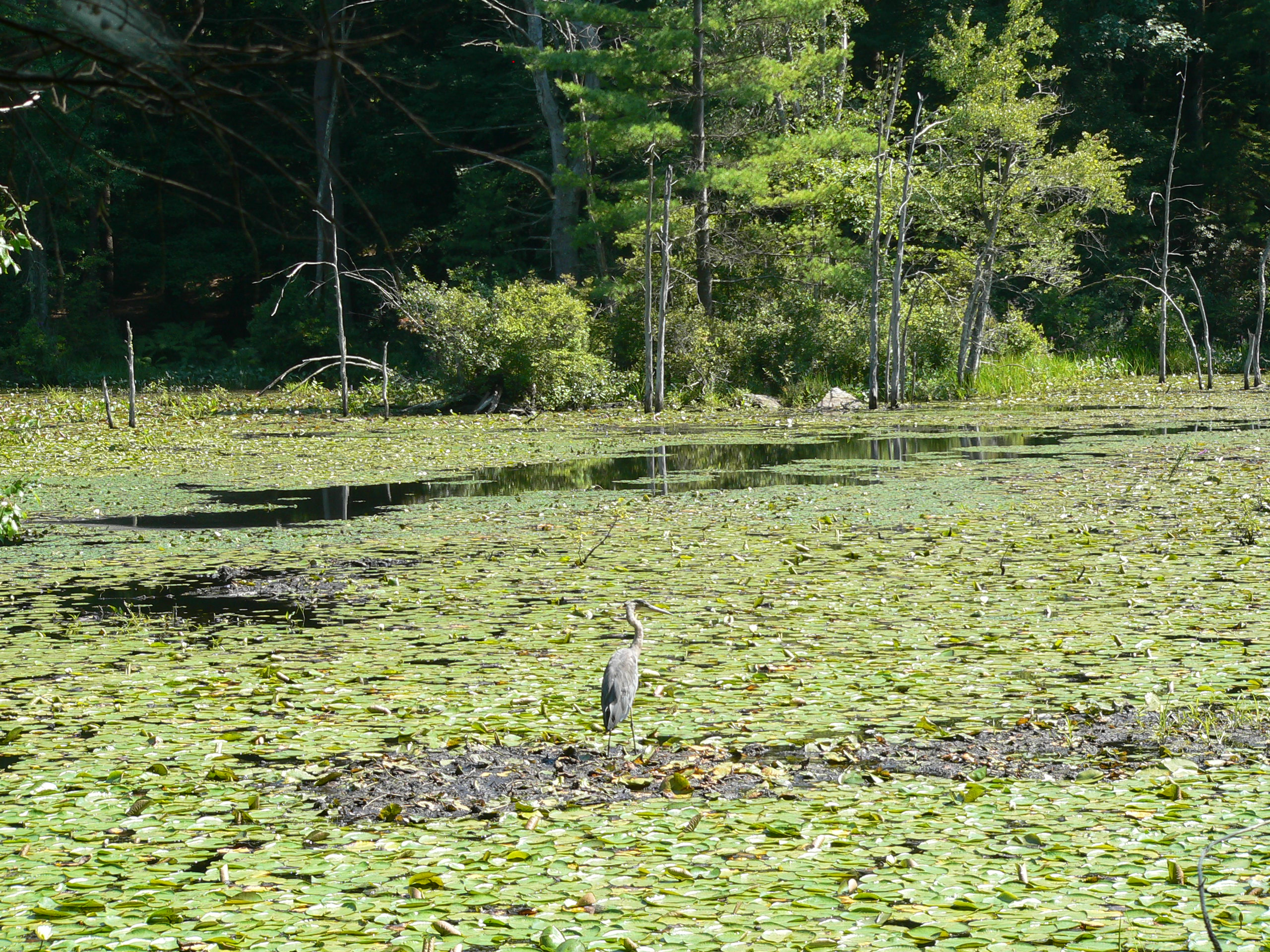
- Heron in Meadow Pond

- Location within Massachusetts Location within the United States
- Location: Carlisle, Massachusetts, United States
- Coordinates: 42°33′21″N 71°21′12″W
- Area: 909 acres (368 ha)
- Established: 1967
- Administrator: Massachusetts Department of Conservation and Recreation
- Website: Official website

Great Brook Farm State Park is a day-use public recreation area featuring an active dairy farm in the town of Carlisle, Massachusetts, United States. The state park was established in 1967 and is managed by the Department of Conservation and Recreation.

== Activities and amenities ==
The park has over 20 miles (32 km) of trails for hiking, mountain biking, cross-country skiing, dog-walking and equestrian use. Canoeing and fishing are offered on Meadow Pond. Tours of the dairy farm are available from May to October. An ice cream stand is open from April to October.

From December to March, the Great Brook Ski Touring Center, located in the park, grooms the park's trails for cross-country skiing and rents skis and snowshoes.

== Gallery ==
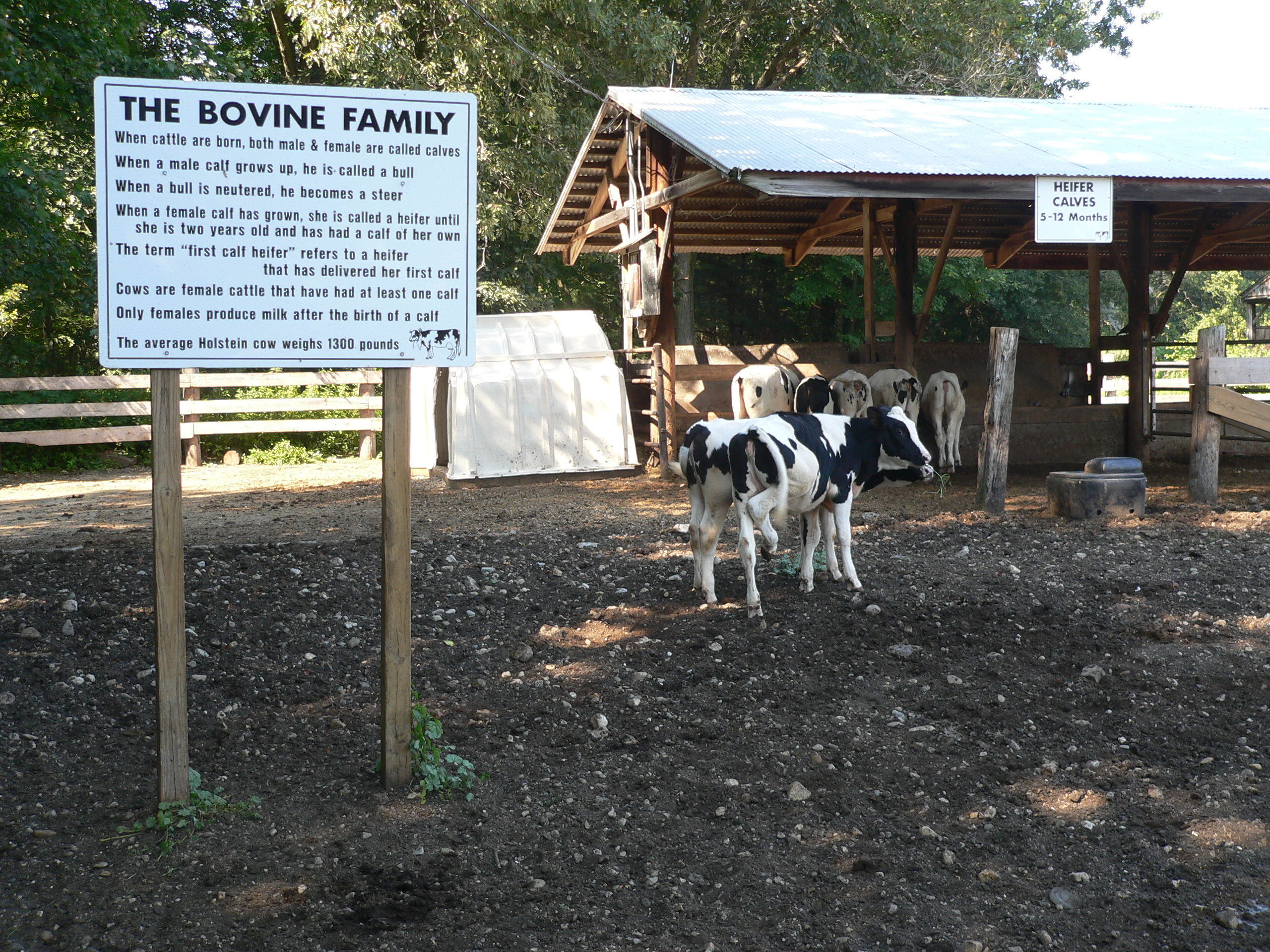
Barnyard

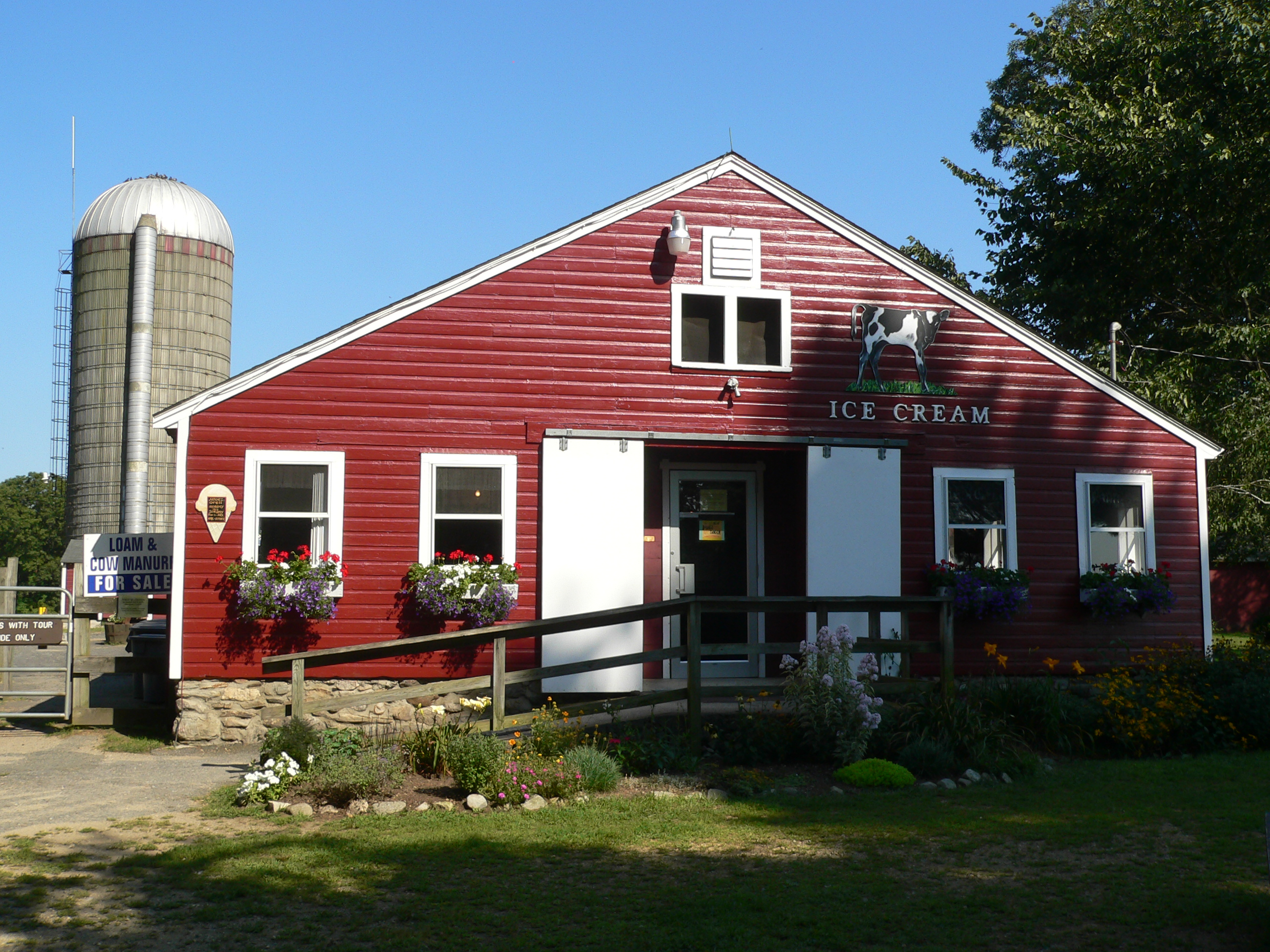
Ice cream stand

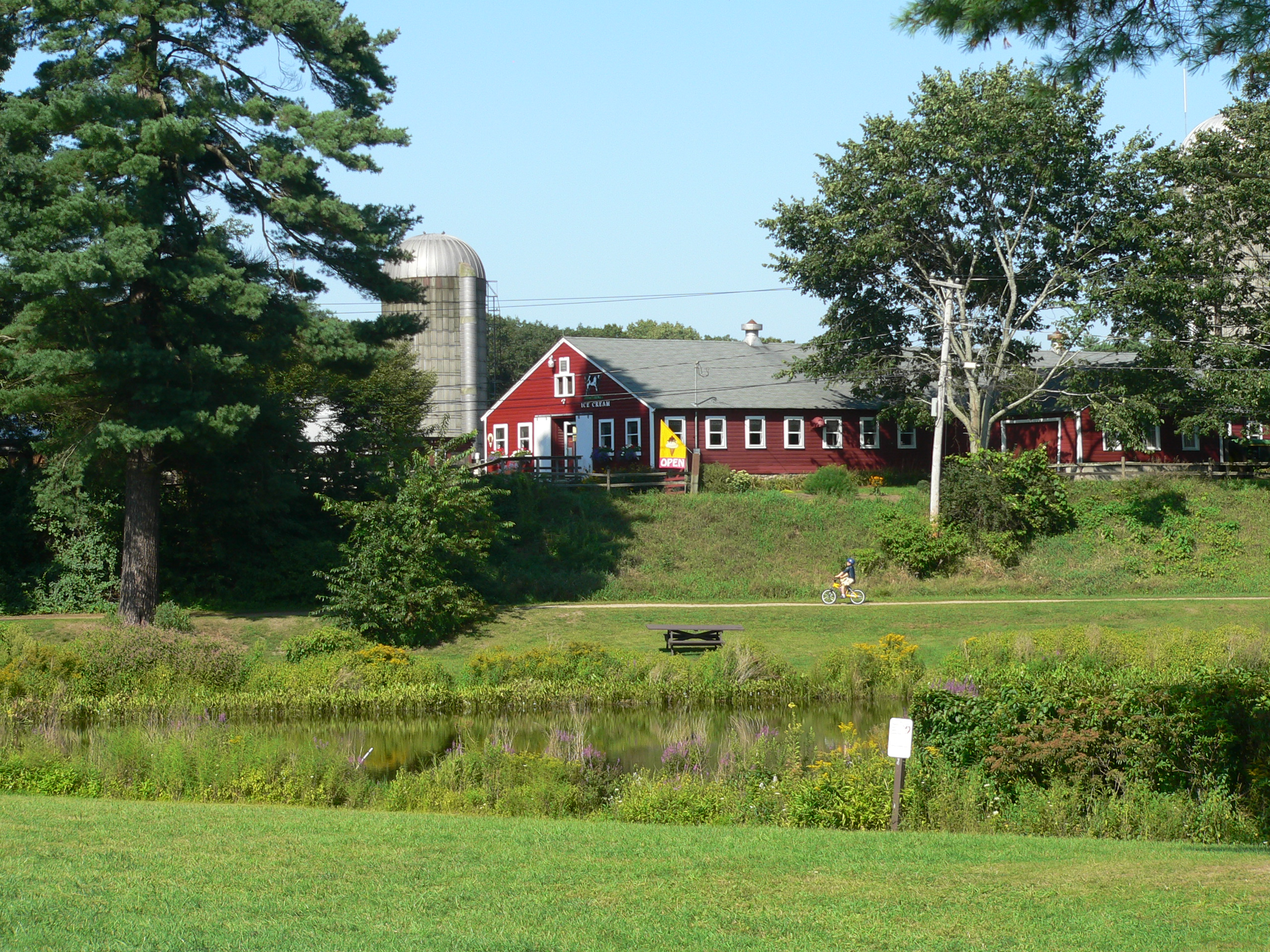
Cycling
