= Comfort Station (Milton, Massachusetts) =

- U.S. National Register of Historic Places
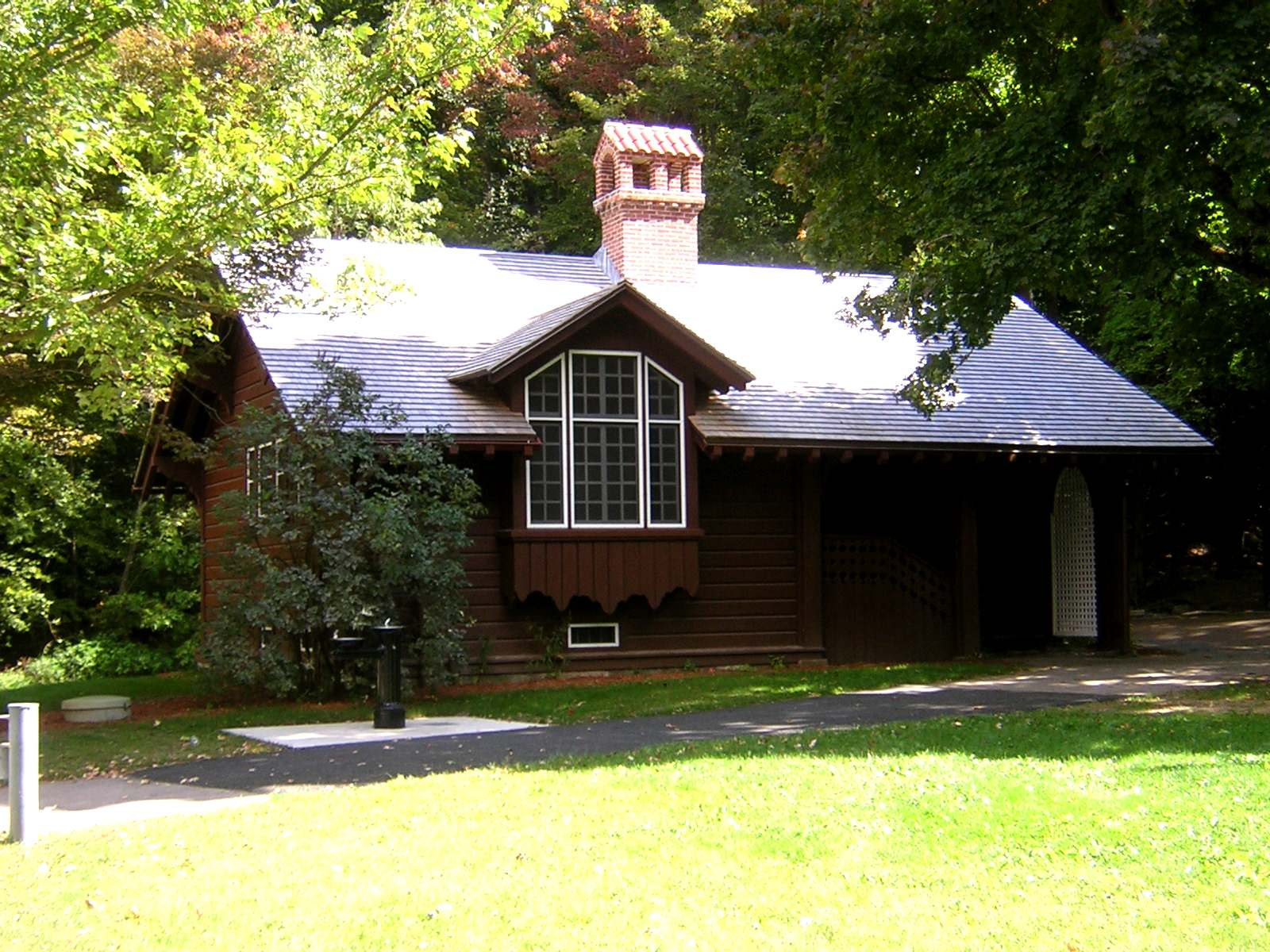
- West side

- Location within Massachusetts Location within the United States
- Location: Blue Hill Ave., Milton, Massachusetts
- Coordinates: 42°13′9.9″N 71°7′5.6″W
- Area: less than one acre
- Built: 1904
- Architect: Stickney & Austin
- Architectural style: Swiss Chalet
- MPS: Blue Hills and Neponset River Reservations MRA
- NRHP reference No.: 80000658
- Added to NRHP: September 25, 1980

The Comfort Station is a historic "sanitary" on Canton Avenue in Milton, Massachusetts. It is located in the Blue Hills Reservation, managed by the Massachusetts Department of Conservation and Recreation (DCR). Built in 1904, it is one of a suite of buildings designed by Stickney & Austin for the Massachusetts Parks Commission, a predecessor organization to the DCR, as the reservation was being developed for more active recreational pursuits. It was added to the National Register of Historic Places on September 25, 1980.

== Description and history ==
The Comfort Station is located on the east side of Canton Avenue (Massachusetts Route 138) on the northwestern slope of Great Blue Hill. It is set near the parking area for the Trailside Museum, a contact facility for persons making use of the Blue Hills Reservation. Although finely detailed by Stickney & Austin in Swiss Chalet style, this is a very simple building, built in 1904 for a single purpose which it still performs today. It is approximately 35x22 feet (10x7m), divided approximately half and half between men's and women's toilets which sit on a terrazzo floor about five feet (1.5m) above grade. Two handicapped accessible toilets were added on the east (back) side during an extensive refurbishing in 2008. It is well preserved, with most exterior parts either original or carefully matched to the original.

The facility was built in 1904, at a time when the reservation was seeing increasing demand for recreational services. It was originally adjacent to a trolley rest stop, but the trolley service and a refreshment pavilion, also designed by Stickney & Austin, are now long gone. It underwent a major renovation in 2008.

== Gallery ==
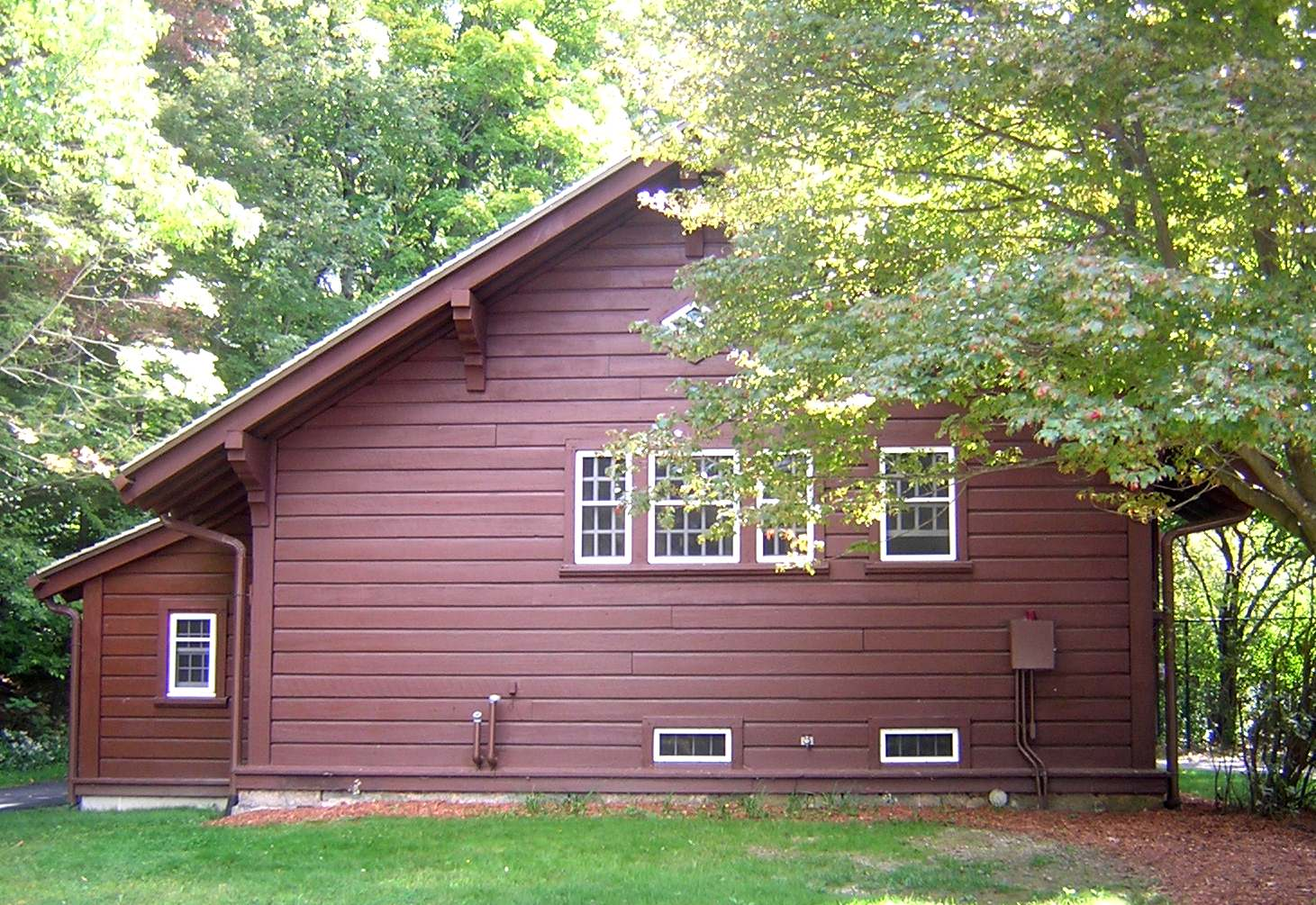
North side

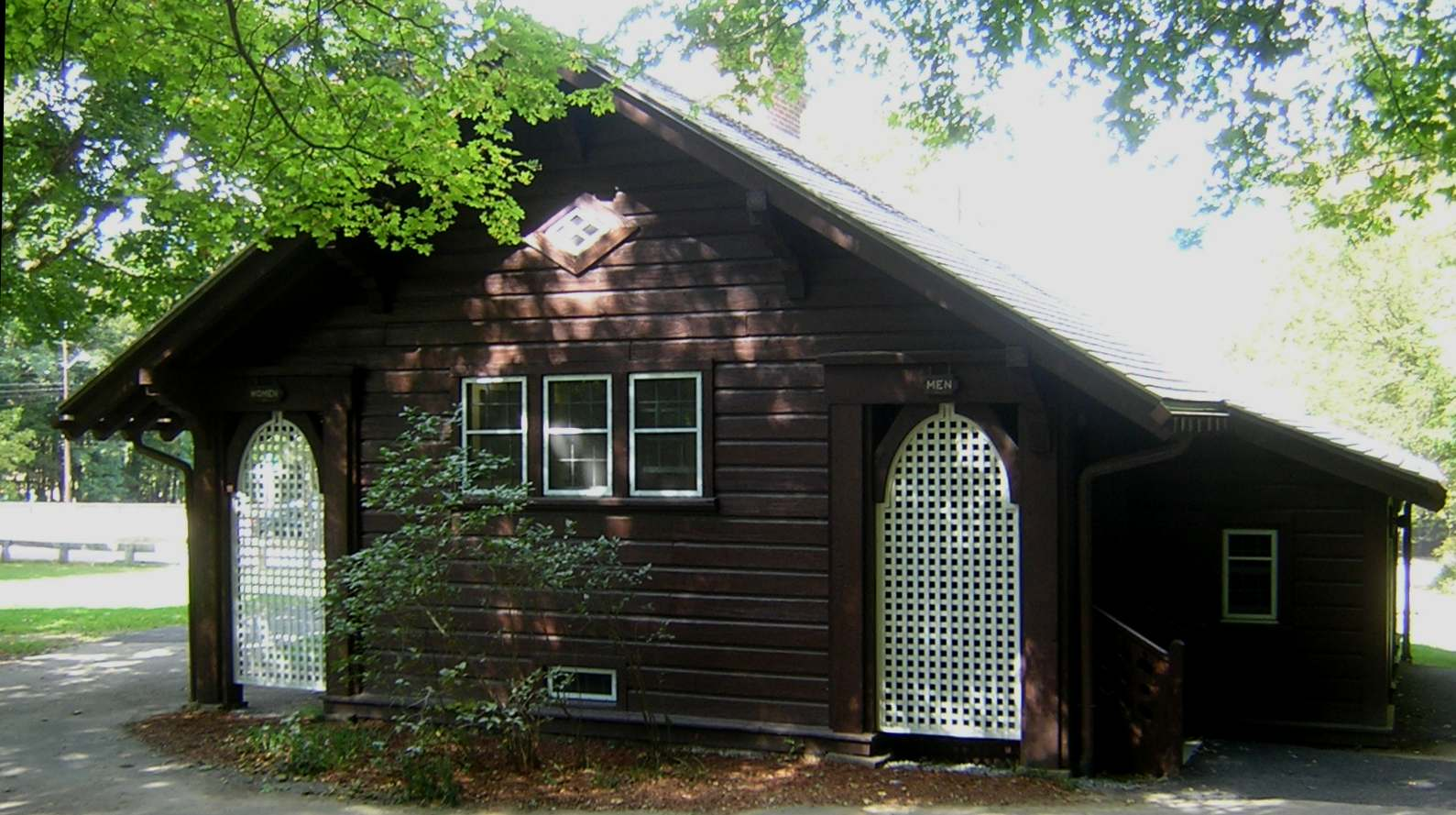
South side
The gratings are not original. The portion to the right are handicapped accessible toilets, added in 2008.

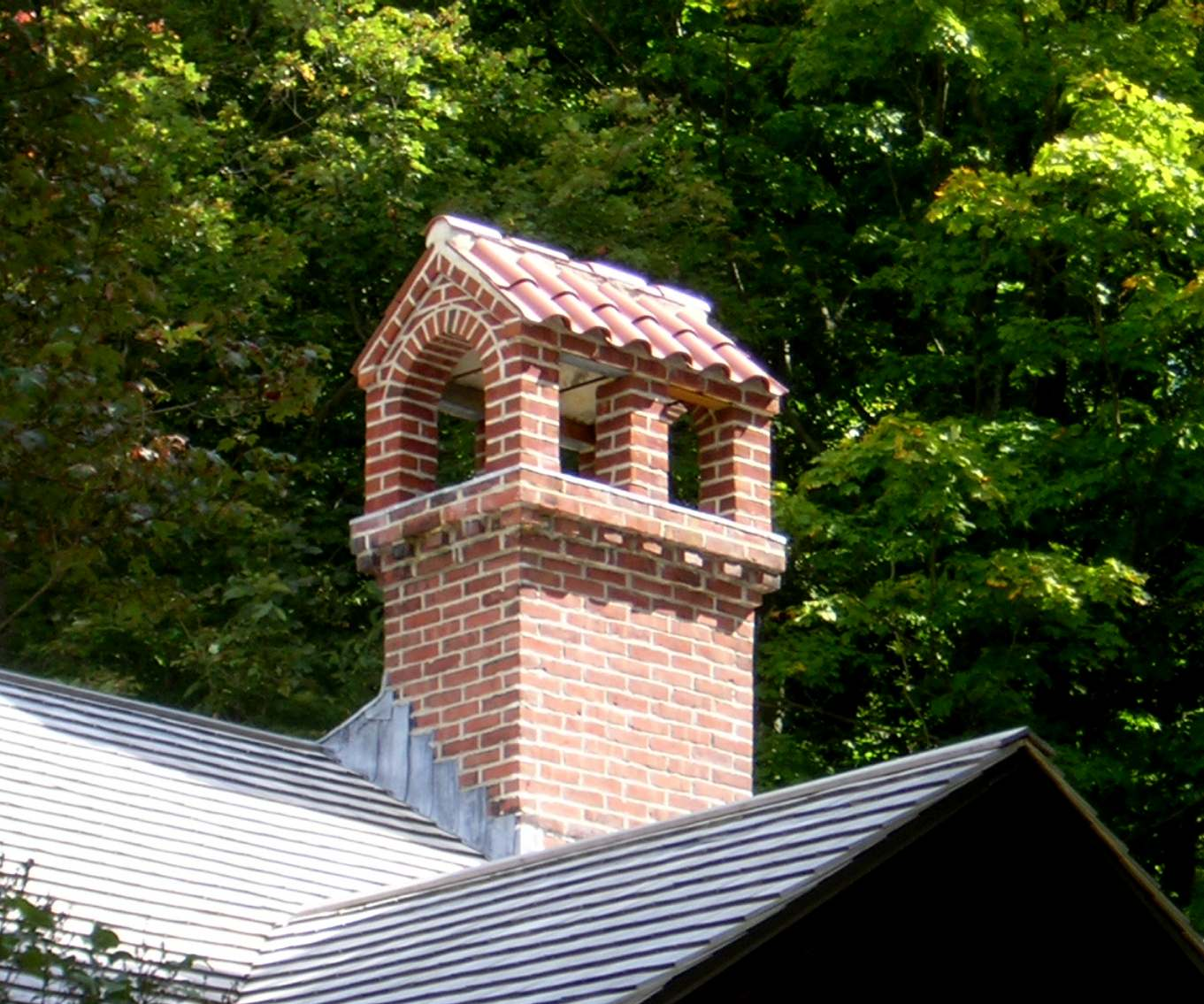
Chimney detail

== See also ==
- National Register of Historic Places listings in Milton, Massachusetts
