= Maudslay State Park =

Massachusetts state park located in Newburyport

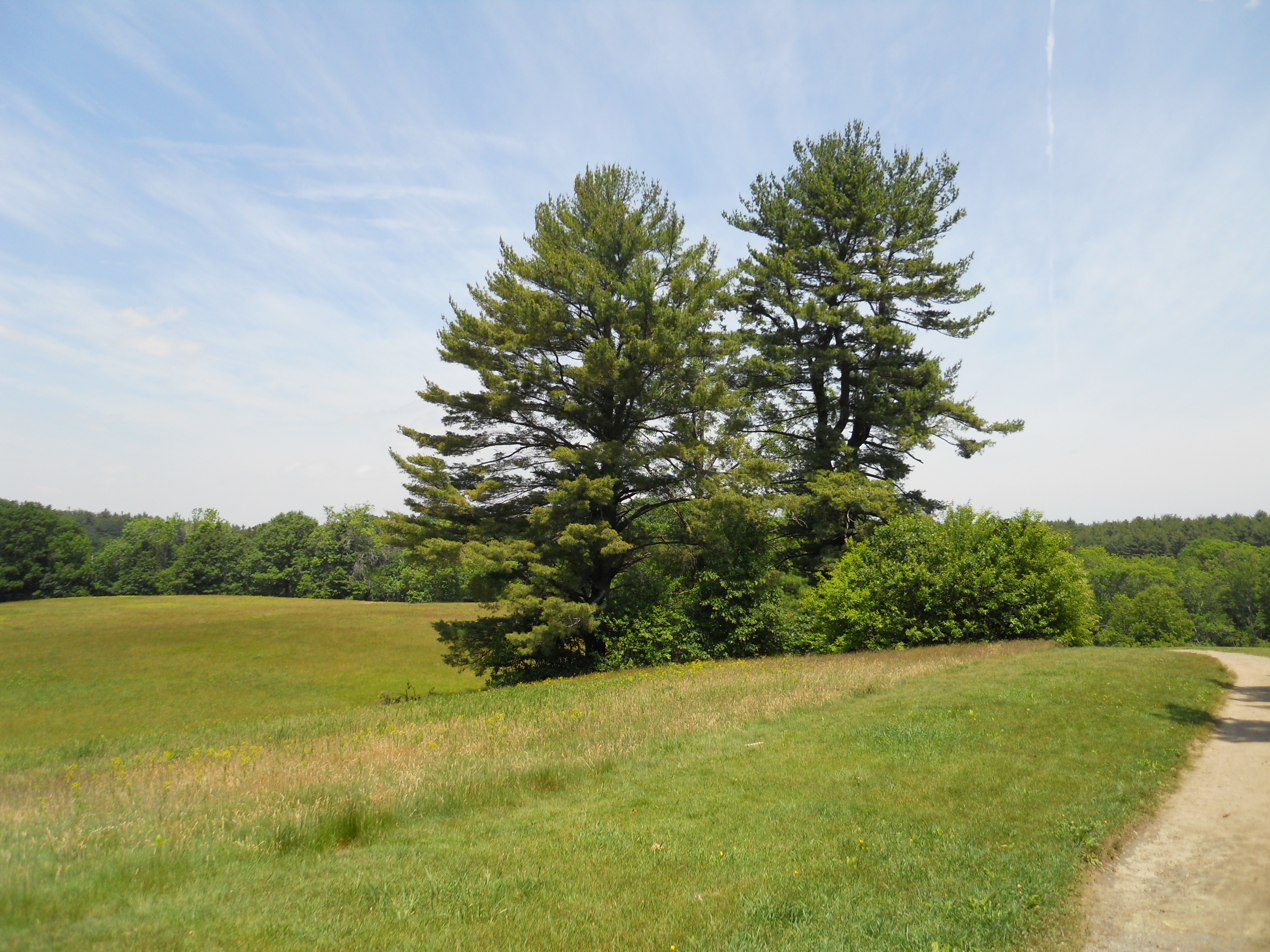
- Pinus strobus standing free in a meadow at Maudslay.

- Location within Massachusetts Location within the United States
- Location: Newburyport, Massachusetts, United States
- Coordinates: 42°49′16″N 70°55′29″W
- Area: 483 acres (195 ha)
- Established: 1985
- Administrator: Massachusetts Department of Conservation and Recreation
- Website: Official website

Maudslay State Park is a landscaped and decorative public recreation area located along the right bank of the Merrimack River in Newburyport, Massachusetts, in the United States. The park is bordered on the west side by the Artichoke River, which is also the border between Newburyport and West Newbury. It features thickets and gardens, rolling meadows, tall pines, and one of the largest naturally occurring stands of mountain laurel in the Commonwealth. Within the park, visitors can find numerous ornamental trees, such as azaleas, and rhododendrons. The park is managed by the Department of Conservation and Recreation.

== Features ==
The most striking natural feature of the park is the primeval stands of white pine on the steep slopes and bluffs of the river, which appear never to have been logged. The laurel forms a continuous thicket along the forest floor around the pines, which are so tall that their tops are not visible in the upper canopy from below. The canopy is a nesting site for bald eagles, who from time to time disrupt traffic by perching in isolated pines hanging over the river outside of the park. The stands are found also in the few ravines that lace the park.

=== Merrimack River ===
The park covers approximately 450 acres (180 ha) of the right bank of the Merrimack River, a tidal estuary at its lower end. The main channel of the estuary runs beneath the bluffs of the park. The channel is navigable and is marked by buoys. Swimming in the Merrimack is prohibited from within Maudslay State Park. The lower river is home to a substantial industry of facilities for docking, storing and repairing recreational boats.

The return of the eagles to their former habitat is related to the return of their food supply. By 1950 the Merrimack River was for the most part devoid of marine and riparian life, due to chemical effluents from the cloth and paper mills upstream in Haverhill, Lawrence, Lowell, Manchester, New Hampshire and Concord, New Hampshire as well as the dumping of raw sewage into the river from every community on its banks. Since then the industry has moved south, sewage is better treated and environmental laws have gone into effect and have been to some degree enforced in every community. Dams upstream prevent the return of migratory piscines but maritime life on the lower river has improved to the point of supporting a new population of eagles.

=== Upper woods ===
Colonial Newburyport lacked the bridges that currently link Newburyport with Salisbury and Amesbury on the left bank of the river. Newbury, West Newbury and Newburyport were originally the same parcel of land, settled in 1635 by an English party, which landed on the left bank of a river later (1697) renamed the Parker River, after the settlement's spiritual counselor, Rev. Parker. Before long the pine woods on the ridge of the right bank of the Merrimack had been cleared in favor of homesteads. "Country Lane" (High Street) led from Newbury to Bradford Road (Storey Street). The remaining forest between Bradford Road and the river was called the "Upper Woods", of which a small fragment hosts the eagles today.

In 1641 the General Court of Massachusetts appointed George Carr official ferryman of the ferry he had started between Carr's and Ram Islands in the Merrimack to Colchester, settled in 1639 (shortly after renamed to Salisbury), which included today's Amesbury. Poore's Lane (Woodland Street) connected Country Lane to the ferry. A similar ferry crossed the Parker. The settlers were concerned with getting the links of the original coastal road, now Route 1A, in place.

By 1654 a new settlement had developed around Emesbury Mill on the Powwow River. It needed a shorter route to Newbury than Carr's Ferry. In 1668 the General Court created Emesbury (Amesbury) and appointed one Mr. Goodwin ferryman of a new ferry to land near the mouth of the Powwow River. Newbury agreed to extend Country Lane past Bradford Road to the ferry. It was perhaps at that time that the future High Street became Ferry Road.

Ferry Road ran along the right bank of the Merrimack to a gap in the bluffs of Upper Woods within the current borders of the park. The site is now forested with second growth. No visible trace of the ferry or the houses remains; however, Old Ferry Road appears there as an overgrown sunken lane between stone walls. Directly across the river is the Amesbury Public Landing. Goodman's Ferry changed hands a number of times, becoming Hook's Ferry at one time. It was discontinued in 1792 with the construction of the Essex Merrimack Bridge.

== History ==
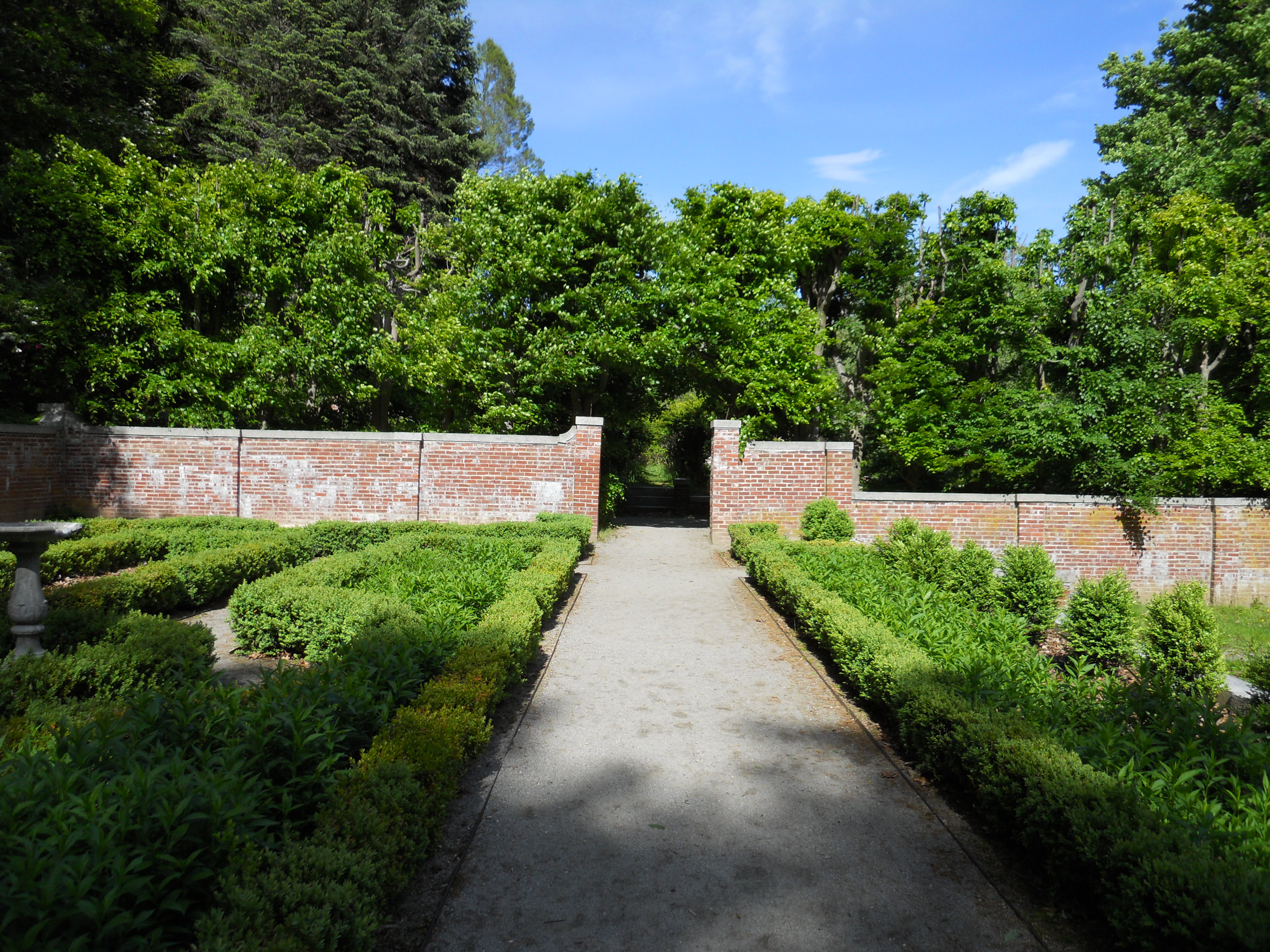
Italian garden, former Moseley Estate. The hedge in the background was intended to screen the greenhouses.

The state park was created from the early 20th century estate of Frederick Strong Moseley, the son of Edward Strong Moseley, 1813–1900, a prominent citizen of Newburyport. Moseley is a variant of Maudesley or Maudesleigh, an English name appearing in the Domesday Book of 1080. The American ancestor, John, entered Massachusetts Bay Colony in 1630, taking up residence in Mattapan, the place depopulated by the death of the Massachusetts tribe of Native Americans by smallpox. John's descendants were Protestant ministers, missionaries to the natives, lawyers, patriots and soldiers of the Revolutionary War, abolitionists and soldiers of the Civil War. Up until Edward, the first names were all taken from the Old Testament. Edward's grandfather, Ebenezer, married Martha Strong, adding her name to the customary English triad of names. Martha's brother, Caleb, was a Massachusetts governor and served as one of the first senators from Massachusetts in the new federal government. Ebenezer's father, Samuel, had been a parson in Connecticut.

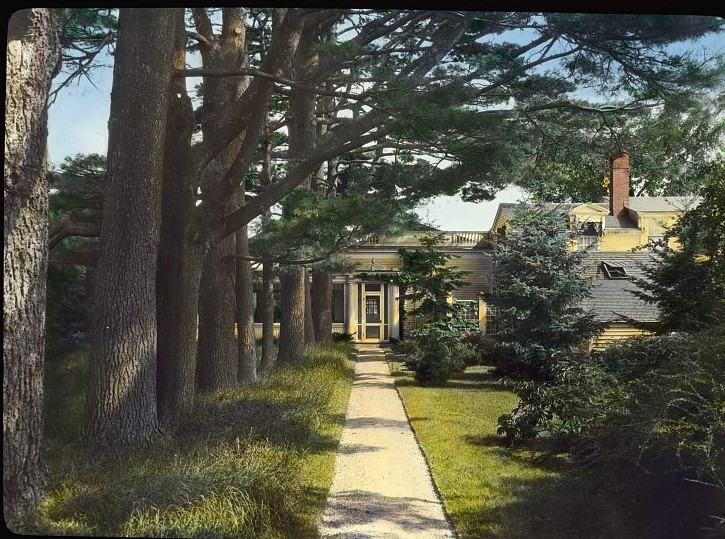
"Chailey," Charles William Moseley house in Newburyport, by Frances Benjamin Johnston, 1920. The house was built in 1915. Charles William Moseley (died 1920), a stock broker, was Frederick Strong Moseley's older brother

The Moseleys were generally prolific, bearing several children each family. The descendants are widespread, bearing the same sorts of names and tending to the same sorts of businesses, including a line of financier Frederick Strong Moseleys, although the Newburyport estate is no longer in their ownership. One of the sons of Ebenezer and Martha, also Ebenezer, after graduating from Yale settled in Newburyport in 1805 and had a distinguished career as a lawyer, legislator and officer of the 6th Massachusetts Militia. He helped to found a bank and an insurance company. His son, Edward, went to Yale for a few years, resigned, and became an agent for a Boston merchant in the East India trade, Benjamin Gould, starting as a clerk. He eventually came to own a share in 99 wooden ships built by the Currier shipyard of Newburyport. He was a trustee in a wide variety of organizations, a corporate director of numerous companies, a major philanthropist and especially a successful bank president in Mechanicks National Bank and the Institute for Savings. His special concern was to house and maintain the Newburyport Public Library, founded 1854, in which he was joined by some of his philanthropic friends, such as George Peabody, merchant, slaver and founder of the public libraries in Danvers, Massachusetts and Peabody, Massachusetts, named after him. In 1839 Edward married Charlotte Chapman, a beauty from Newark, New Jersey, who was also an episcopal minister's daughter. They had many children, only five of which survived to adulthood, including Frederick Strong Moseley, born in 1852, who became a broker in Boston and was a director of the Shawmut Bank there. On Edward's death in 1900, the children inherited a not inconsiderable estate. Frederick proceeded to acquire and improve the Newburyport property, consulting and hiring the best landscape architects in Massachusetts of the day.

Originally named Maudesleigh, the estate was created on agricultural fields by landscape architect Martha Brookes Hutcheson, one of the earliest female members of the American Society of Landscape Architects, who designed the grounds around the main house, entry drive, and formal gardens (1904–1906). Lord and Burnham designed various of the greenhouses. At its peak, about 40 staff serviced the estate's three greenhouses, head house, cold frames, espaliered fruit trees, winter plant house, 2-acre (8,100 m^{2}) formal vegetable and cutting garden, 500-foot (150 m) perennial border, Italian garden, rose garden, and rhododendrons, azaleas, and specimen trees, as well as the site's native mountain laurels.

William G. Rantoul, of the Boston firm Jacques and Rantoul, served as the estate's principal architect, creating most of the original architecture in the years 1895-1910. He designed the 72-room main house (demolished 1955) and houses for the coachman, forester, and head gardener. A second large house was built 1939-1941 for Helen Moseley, Frederick's younger daughter. In the early 1950s the privacy and remoteness of the estate were diminished with the construction of Route 95 through the middle of upper woods and the contemporaneous construction of Route 495 at the top of the left bank of the river, both of which became major routes for heavy trucks. Highway noise in the park during business hours is insistent. On the death of the Moseleys the family had the main house torn down. In 1978 Helen's house was destroyed by fire. Today only few of some 30 structures remain.

=== State park ===
In 1985 the property was acquired by the Massachusetts Department of Environmental Management for $5 million to become Maudslay State Park. The main gate, the drives, the stone bridges and overlooks have survived, as well as stands of lilac, rhododendron and some of the fruit trees. The sites of the grand houses have been leveled. The tops of the foundations are visible in the mowed lawn. The swimming pool of the main house is empty and is choked with thickets. Except for select locations, the gardens and greenhouses have fallen into ruin, the walls scarcely visible on the overgrown hillside. The dairy farm on the property survived and was a working farm in good repair until the early 1980s.

The park service has added a parking lot. A nearby house became the park headquarters. A staff of rangers and grounds employees maintain the meadows and trails and conduct guided tours; however, visitors are welcome to hike the trails, except for areas restricted for ecological purposes. A memorial running course has been delineated. It winds through the meadows and pines. Rest rooms and shower facilities were constructed in the parking lot. Equestrian parties on the larger trails are common. The horses are often brought in privately in trailers, which park in the meadow next to the lot.

Since 1987, Maudslay State Park has been the home of Theater in the Open, which performs three live outdoor shows in the park throughout the year. The theater is also known for their giant puppet pageant every May called "The Rites of Spring" and their walk in October called "Maudslay is Haunted".

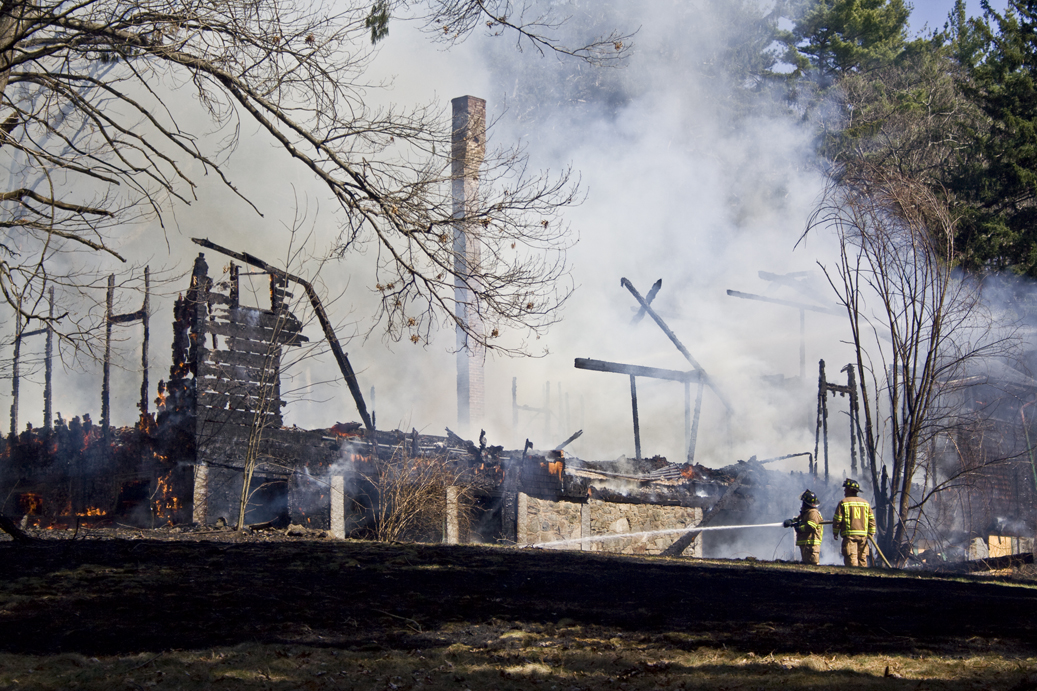
Maudslay State Park barn fire on April 3, 2010

On April 3, 2010 around 1:58 P.M., the Coachman's Barn, which was customarily used for the Theater in the Open, caught fire. The Newburyport, Salisbury and Amesbury Fire Departments got the blaze under control around 3:30 P.M. Only the stone foundation and the chimney survived. The chimney has been taken down for safety reasons. The small house next to the barn was largely untouched.

== Activities and amenities ==
The park has trails for walking, hiking, horseback riding, and cross-country skiing, and is also the home course of the Newburyport High School Cross Country Running team. There are also educational programs, picnicking facilities, and restrooms.
