= Lynn Shore Drive =

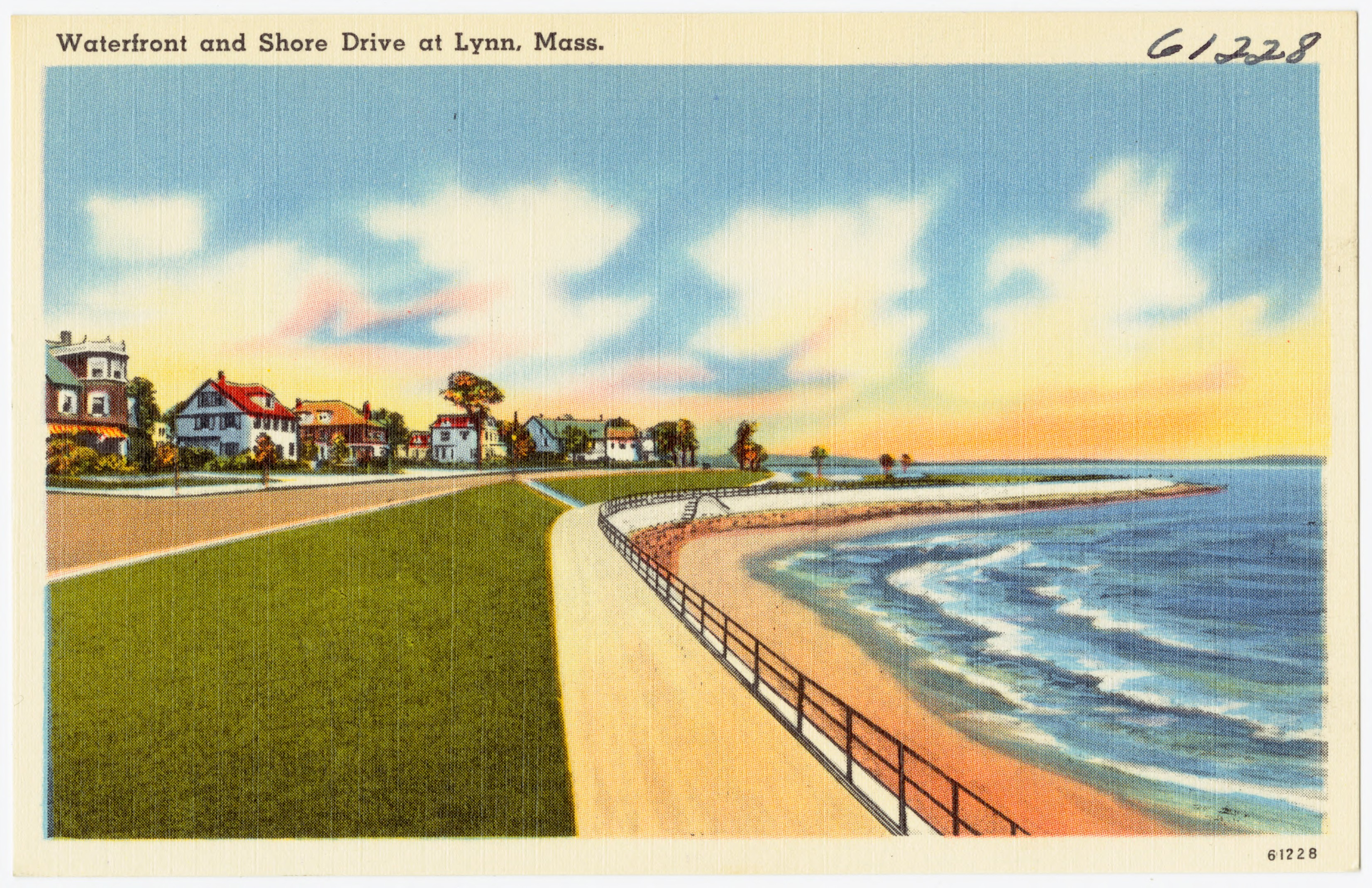
- Vintage Lynn Shore Drive Postcard
- Interactive map of Lynn Shore Drive
- Maintained by: Department of Conservation and Recreation
- Length: 1 mi (1.6 km)
- Coordinates: 42°27′44.11″N 70°55′42.45″W

Construction
- Completion: 1907

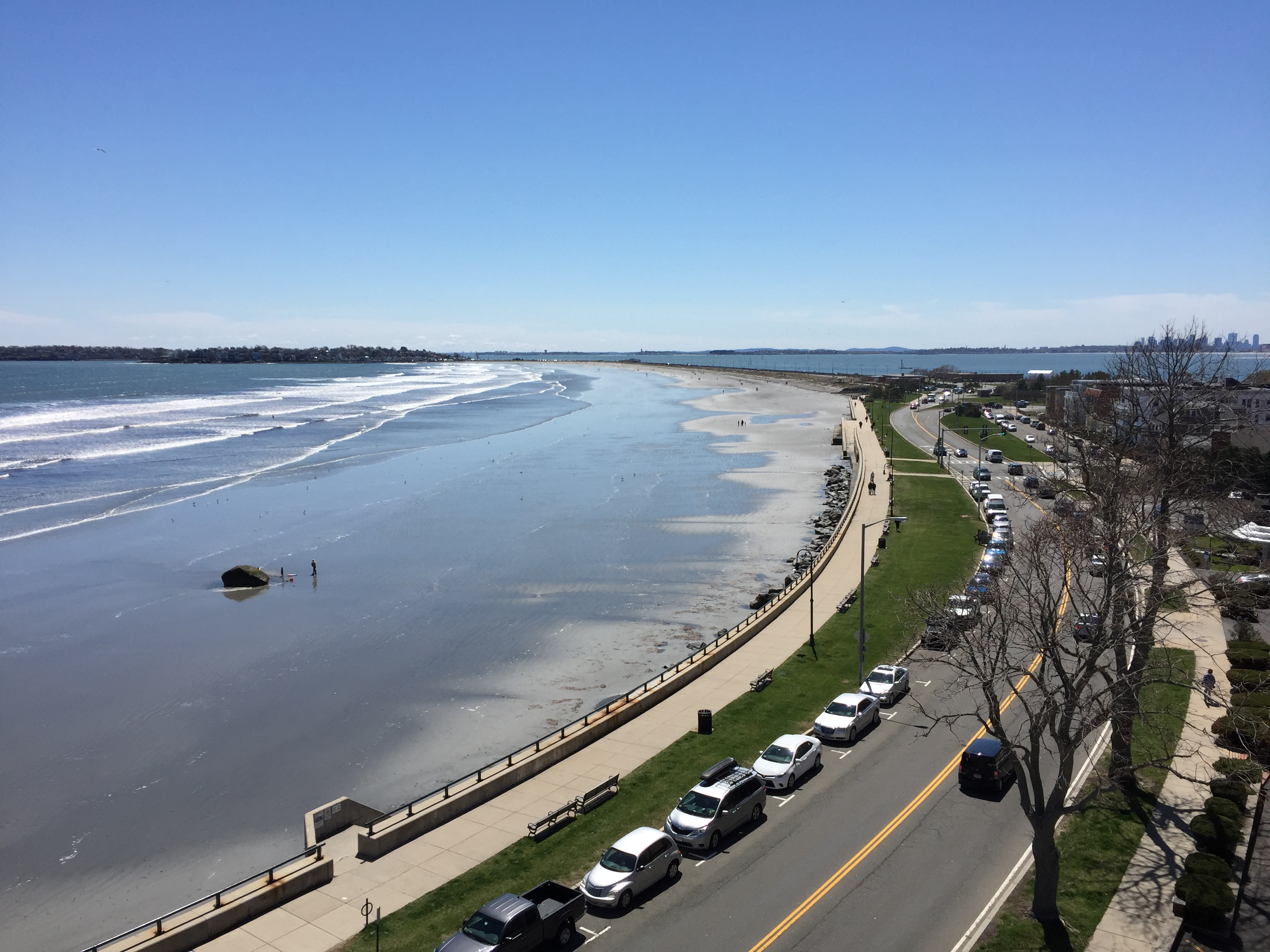
Southerly view over Lynn Shore Drive, toward Nahant and downtown Boston

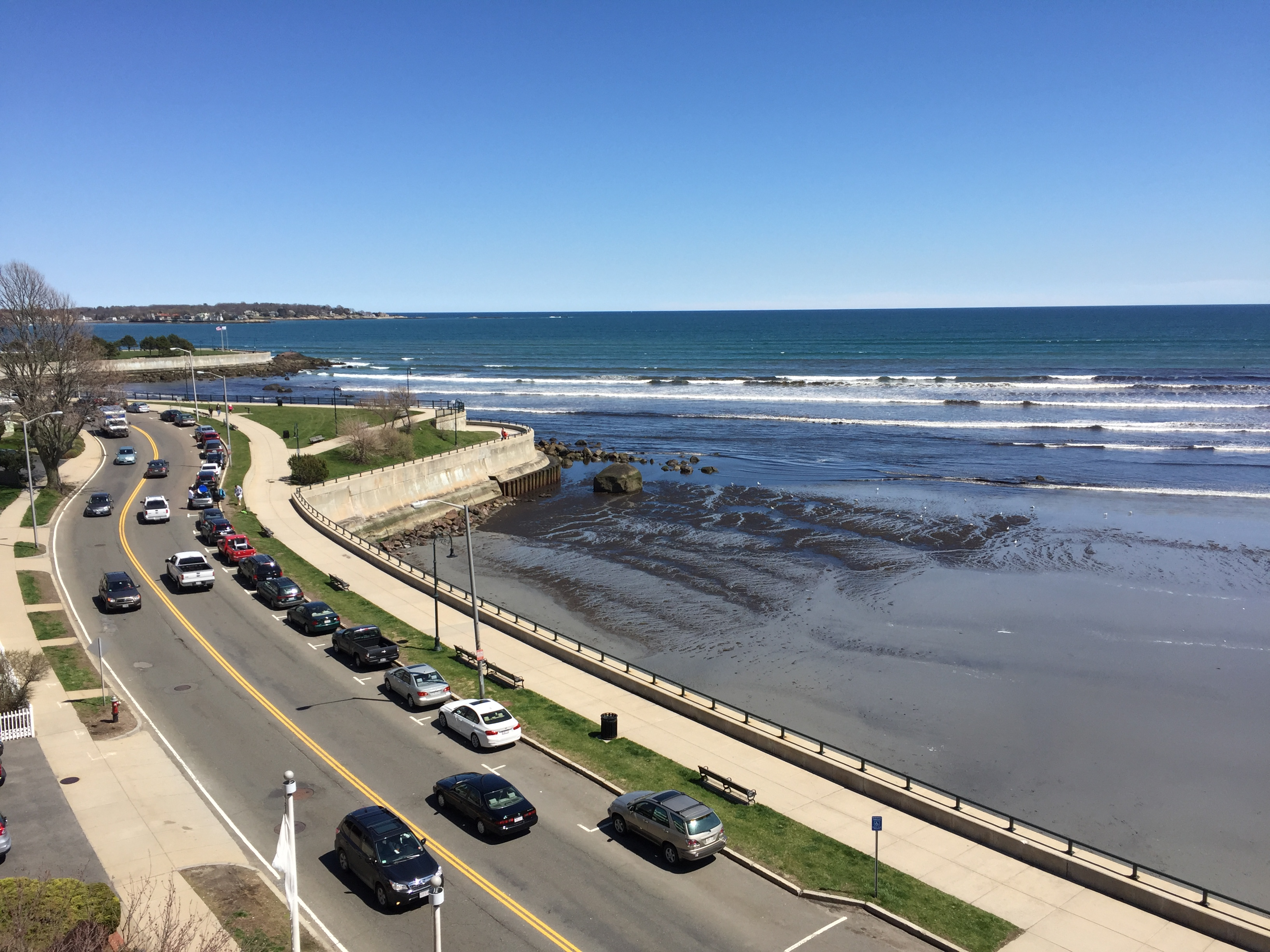
Northerly view over Lynn Shore Drive to Swampscott

Lynn Shore Drive is an historic oceanfront parkway in Lynn, Massachusetts, United States. Composed of a two-lane road, parkland, a seaside pedestrian esplanade, and a seawall, Lynn Shore Drive runs for approximately one mile (1.6 km) along Lynn's Atlantic Ocean coastline, following the upland boundary of the adjoining Lynn Shore Reservation, and connecting Nahant with Swampscott.

Known for its scenic views of the open Atlantic, Nahant Bay, Egg Rock, and Boston Skyline, Lynn Shore Drive is part of the Essex Coastal Scenic Byway and forms the southeasterly edge of the National Register Diamond Historic District. The Lynn Shore Drive seawall is a contributing resource to the National Register District—as are many of the historic homes lining the drive’s inland edge.

An early example of a parkway, and distinctive by virtue of its oceanfront setting, Lynn Shore Drive opened to the public in 1907. Prior to the drive’s creation, Lynn’s oceanfront was held largely in private estates and was not accessible to the public.

The effort to create Lynn Shore Drive was pioneered in part by George N. Nichols, a Lynn resident who, in 1874—at age 19—petitioned Lynn’s City Council to appropriate for public use the lands along the Diamond District’s oceanfront.

Between 1895 and 1903, the Commonwealth of Massachusetts’ Metropolitan District Commission acquired land parcels encompassing a substantial stretch of Lynn’s coastline, laying the groundwork for the construction of Lynn Shore Drive—and the contemporaneous creation of the adjoining Lynn Shore and Nahant Beach Reservations.

Lynn Shore Drive is today managed by the Metropolitan District Commission's successor agency, the Massachusetts Department of Conservation and Recreation.
