= Nahant Beach Boulevard =

Historic parkway in Massachusetts, US

- Nahant Beach Boulevard-Metropolitan Park System of Greater Boston
- U.S. National Register of Historic Places
- U.S. Historic district
- Location within Massachusetts Location within the United States
- Location: Lynn and Nahant, Massachusetts
- Coordinates: 42°26′12″N 70°56′17″W
- Built: 1936
- Architect: Eliot, Charles; et al.
- MPS: Metropolitan Park System of Greater Boston MPS
- NRHP reference No.: 03000747
- Added to NRHP: August 11, 2003

Nahant Beach Boulevard, also Nahant Causeway and Nahant Road, is a historic road in eastern Massachusetts, US, on the isthmus connecting Nahant to the mainland at Lynn. The road runs from the Lynn Rotary, its junction with Lynn Shore Drive and the Lynnway, about 1.5 miles (2.4 km) to Wilson Road in Nahant. It passes through Nahant Beach Reservation, a state park offering beach access on the isthmus. The road offers expansive views of the area coastlines and Boston Harbor. Both the park and the roadway are administered by the Massachusetts Department of Conservation and Recreation.

Nahant Beach Boulevard was first laid out in 1905, as part of the Metropolitan District Commission's program of developing oceanfront parkways, and provided the first paved road access to Nahant. It was designed by the firm of Olmsted, Olmsted, and Eliot, predecessor to the Olmsted Brothers landscape design firm. Around the same time, rail access and a bridle path were also added to the isthmus.

In 1936 that roadway alignment was converted into a parking area, and the present roadway was completed the following year on the alignment of the railroad bed. The Lynn Rotary was completed in 1935. This work, along with the conversion of the bridle path to a promenade, was paid for by Works Progress Administration grants. Since then modifications to the roadway have been modest. Seawalls have been built, a chain link fence was installed on the wall between the road and the parking lot, and the rotary was landscaped.

When the roadway was listed on the National Register of Historic Places in 2003, the designation included the roadway itself, the Lynn Rotary and the Spanish–American War Memorial located in the rotary. A second memorial, the Aliferis Monument, postdates the period of significance for the listing.

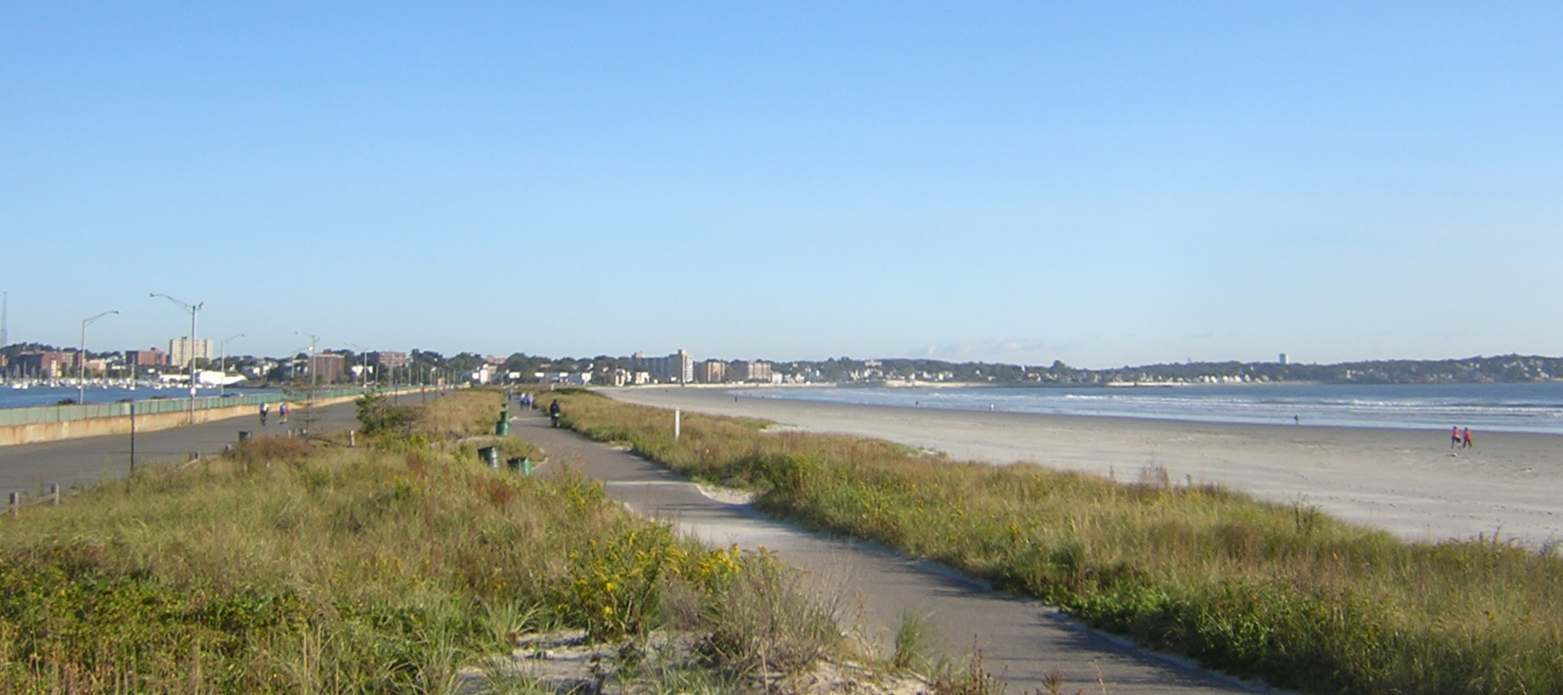

== See also ==
- National Register of Historic Places listings in Lynn, Massachusetts
- National Register of Historic Places listings in Essex County, Massachusetts
