= Castle Rock (Massachusetts) =

Island in Essex County, Massachusetts, United States

Coordinates: 42°25′18″N 70°54′25″W

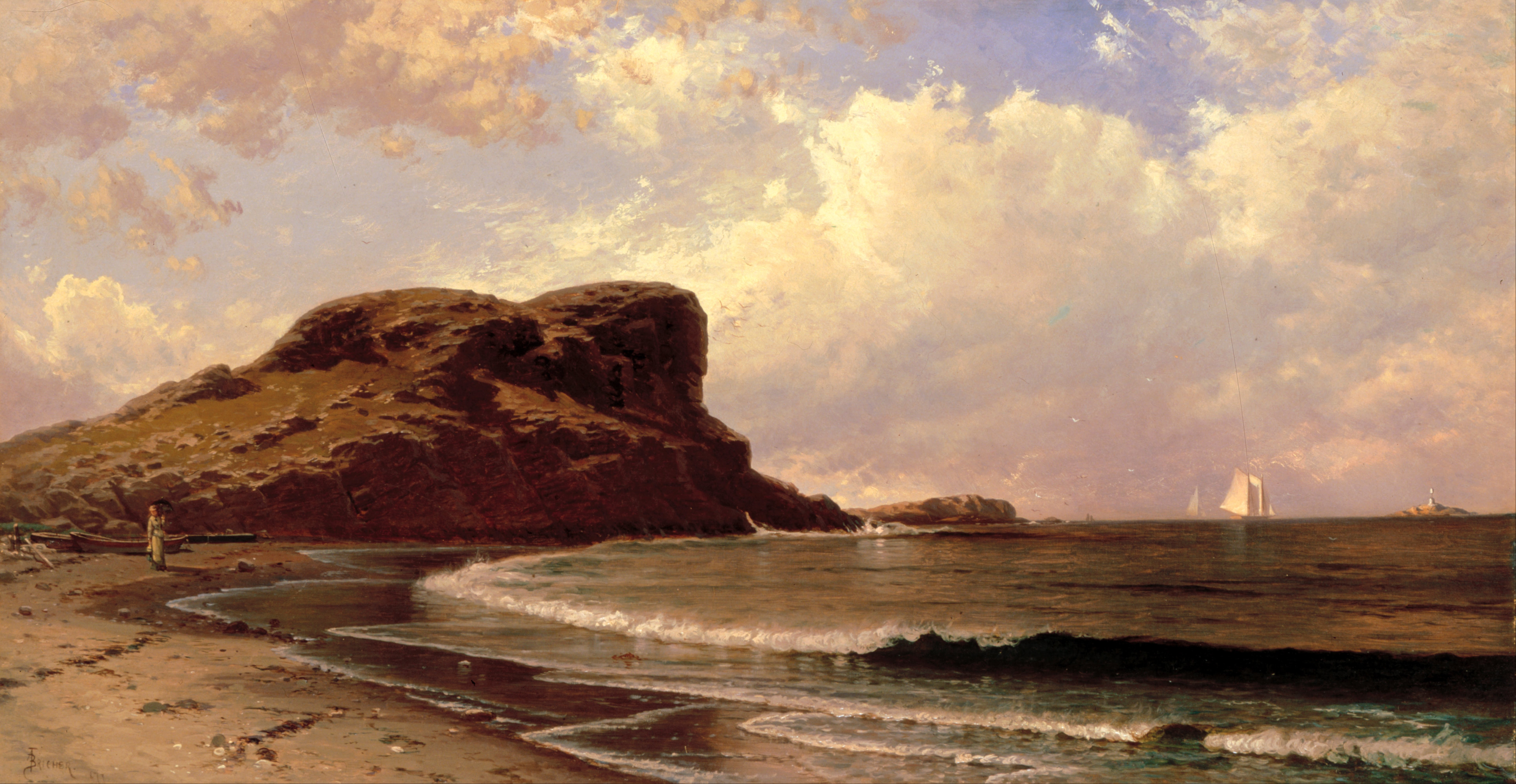
Alfred T. Bricher - Castle Rock, Nahant, Massachusetts

Castle Rock is a barren, uninhabited island located in Nahant Bay in Nahant, Massachusetts.
