= Lynn Shore Reservation =

State reserve in Massachusetts

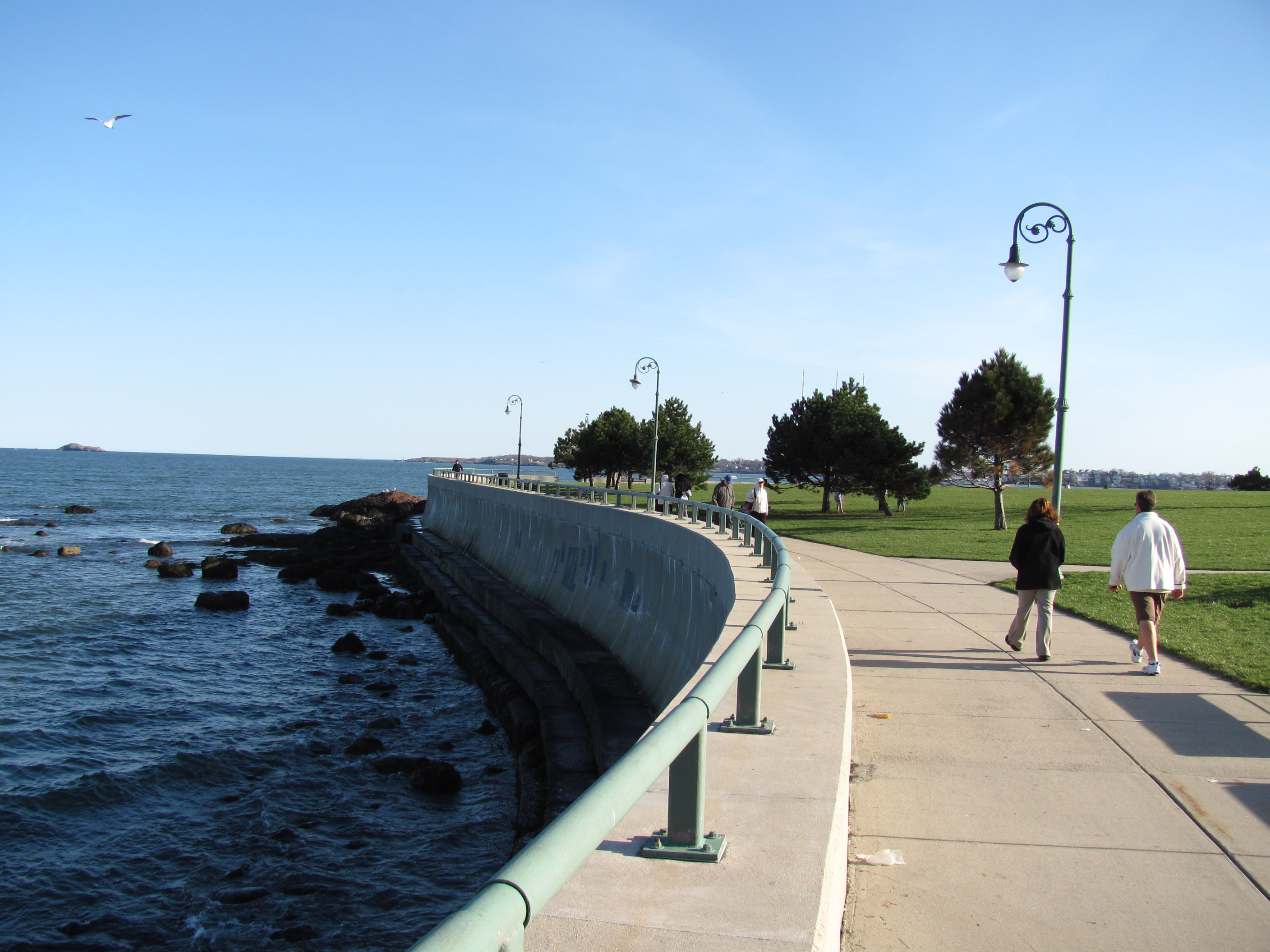
- Red Rock Park

- Location within Massachusetts Location within the United States
- Location: Lynn, Massachusetts, United States
- Coordinates: 42°27′38″N 70°55′53″W
- Area: 22 acres (8.9 ha)
- Administrator: Massachusetts Department of Conservation and Recreation
- Website: Official website

Lynn Shore Reservation is a protected coastal reservation in the city of Lynn, Massachusetts. It includes 22 acres (8.9 ha) of beaches and recreational areas. From north to south, King's Beach, Red Rock Park and Lynn Beach are located along Lynn Shore Drive and Nahant Bay, a small bay of the Atlantic. The reservation shares athletic fields with Nahant Beach Reservation in the area around Nahant Rotary, a traffic circle at its southern end.

The reservation is part of the Metropolitan Park System of Greater Boston, and is managed by the Department of Conservation and Recreation, which also manages the adjoining Lynn Shore Drive parkway.
