= Pea Island, Massachusetts =

Island in Massachusetts, United States

Coordinates: 42.41537358295868°N 70.90922752429188°W

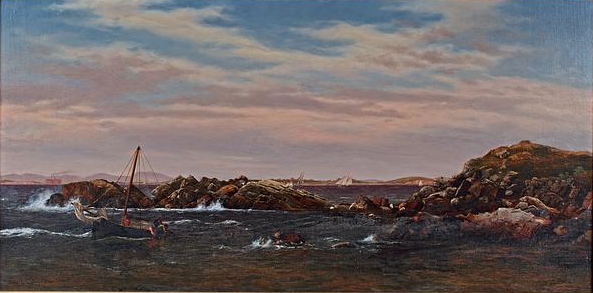
1870 oil painting of Pea Island

Pea Island is a small, rocky, uninhabited island about 0.6 miles (970 meters) south-southest of the southern tip of Nahant, Massachusetts.

The island is mostly bare rock, but there is a little soil, and beachpea grows on the island and is apparently the source of the island's name.

Nearby islands include the smaller Stag Islands to the southeast.
