= Nahant Beach Reservation =

Protected coastal reservation in Massachusetts

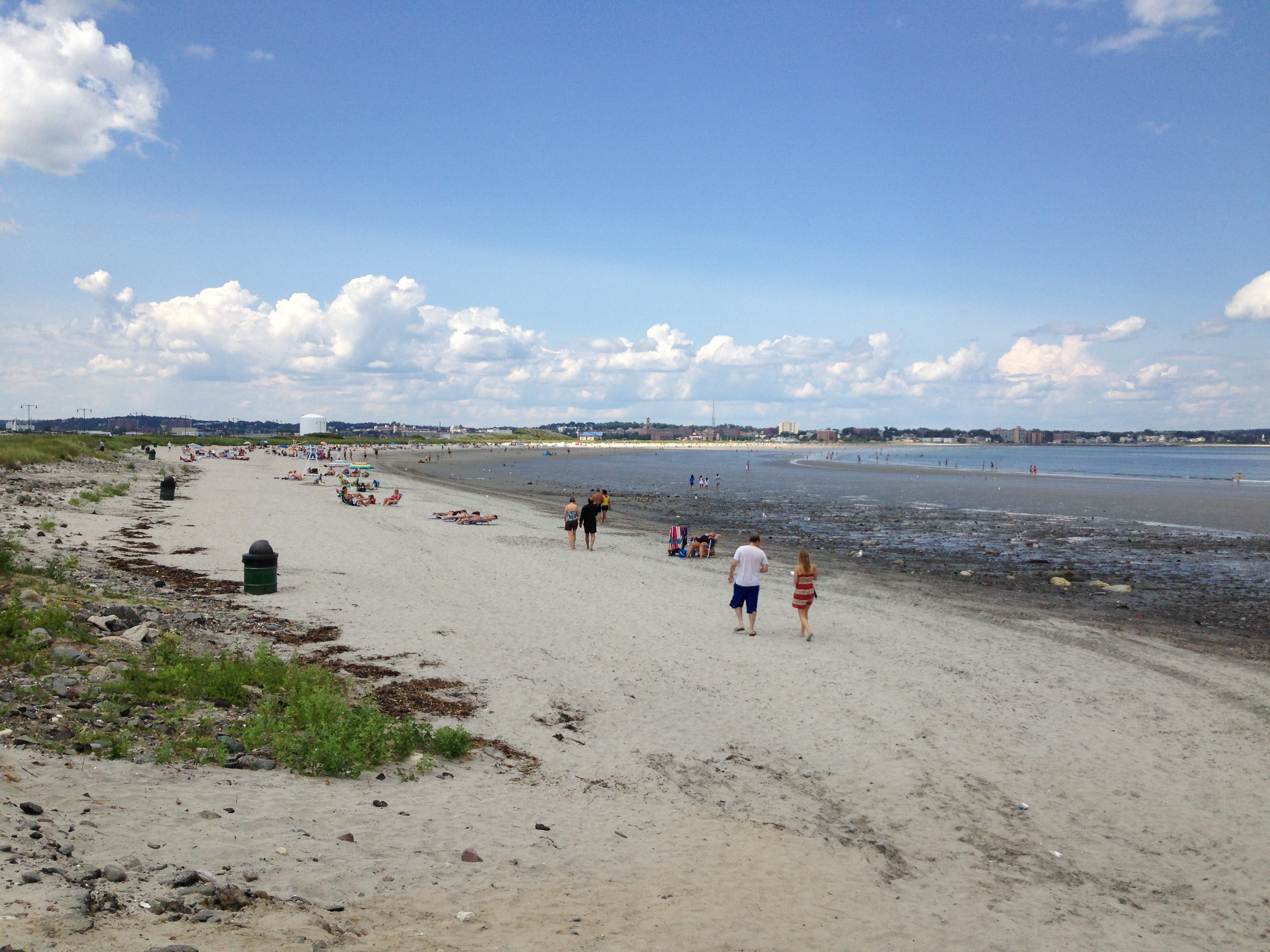
- Long Beach

- Location within Massachusetts Location within the United States
- Location: Nahant, Massachusetts, United States
- Coordinates: 42°26′50″N 70°56′12″W
- Area: 67 acres (27 ha)
- Elevation: 0 ft (0 m)
- Established: ca. 1900
- Administrator: Massachusetts Department of Conservation and Recreation
- Website: Official website

Nahant Beach Reservation is a protected coastal reservation covering 67 acres (27 ha) of beach and recreational areas in the town of Nahant, Massachusetts. Nahant Road, formerly known as Nahant Beach Boulevard when it was added to the National Register of Historic Places in 2003, offers access to 7,000-foot-long (2,100 m) Long Beach on the Atlantic Ocean side to the east. The reservation includes a boat ramp with access to Lynn Harbor and shares athletic fields with Lynn Shore Reservation in the area around Nahant Rotary, a traffic circle at the reservation's northern end. The reservation is part of the Metropolitan Park System of Greater Boston.

== History ==
In the early 1900s, privately owned shoreline property at Nahant Beach and Lynn Shore was acquired by the Metropolitan District Commission to create two abutting reservations. Following the purchases, buildings including the Hotel Nahant were removed to give the public access to beaches and to protect natural features. A bathhouse was built at the north end of the reservation in 1901; beach shelters, benches, and a bridle path were added in the early 20th century.

== Gallery ==
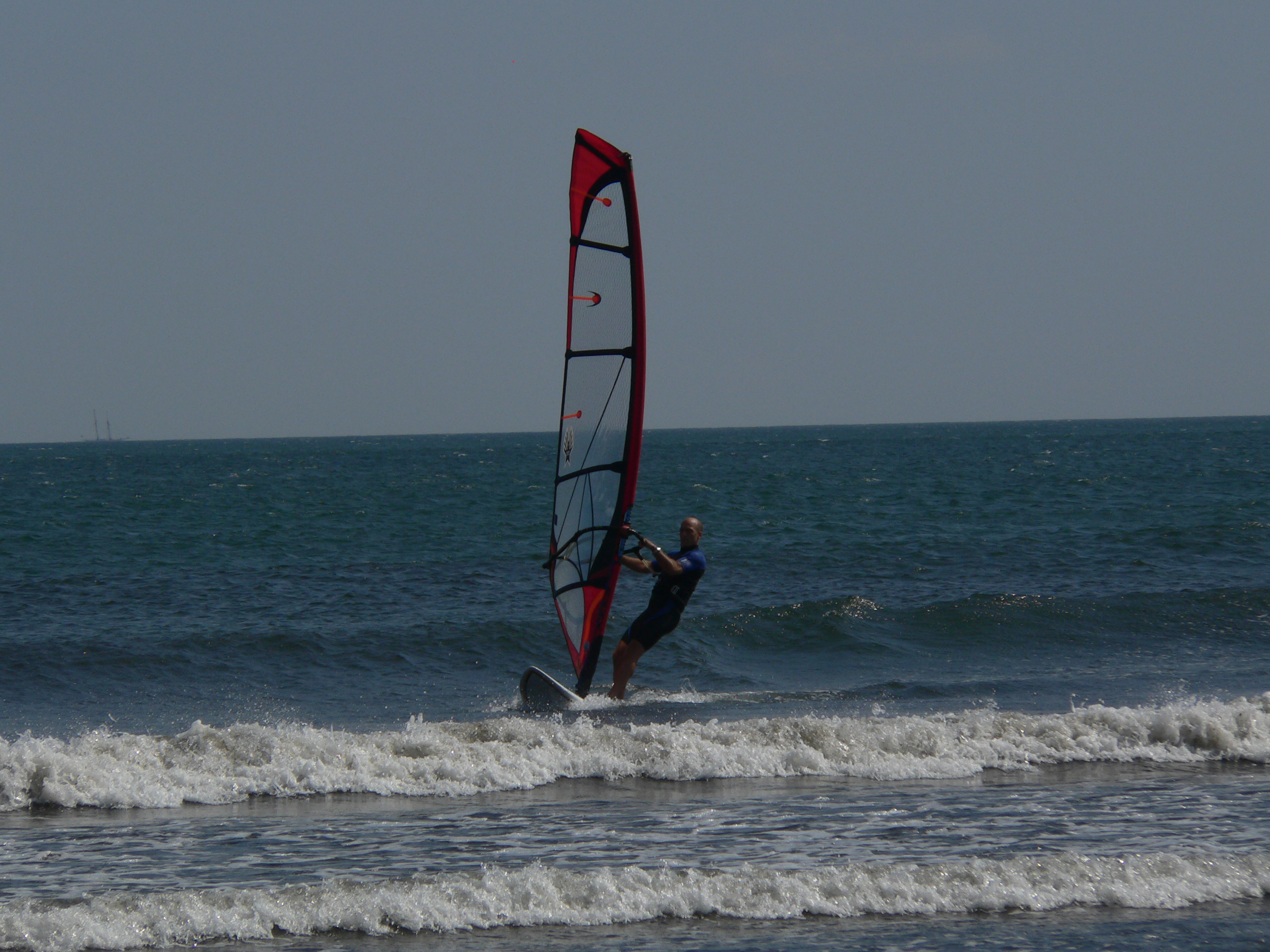
windsurfer

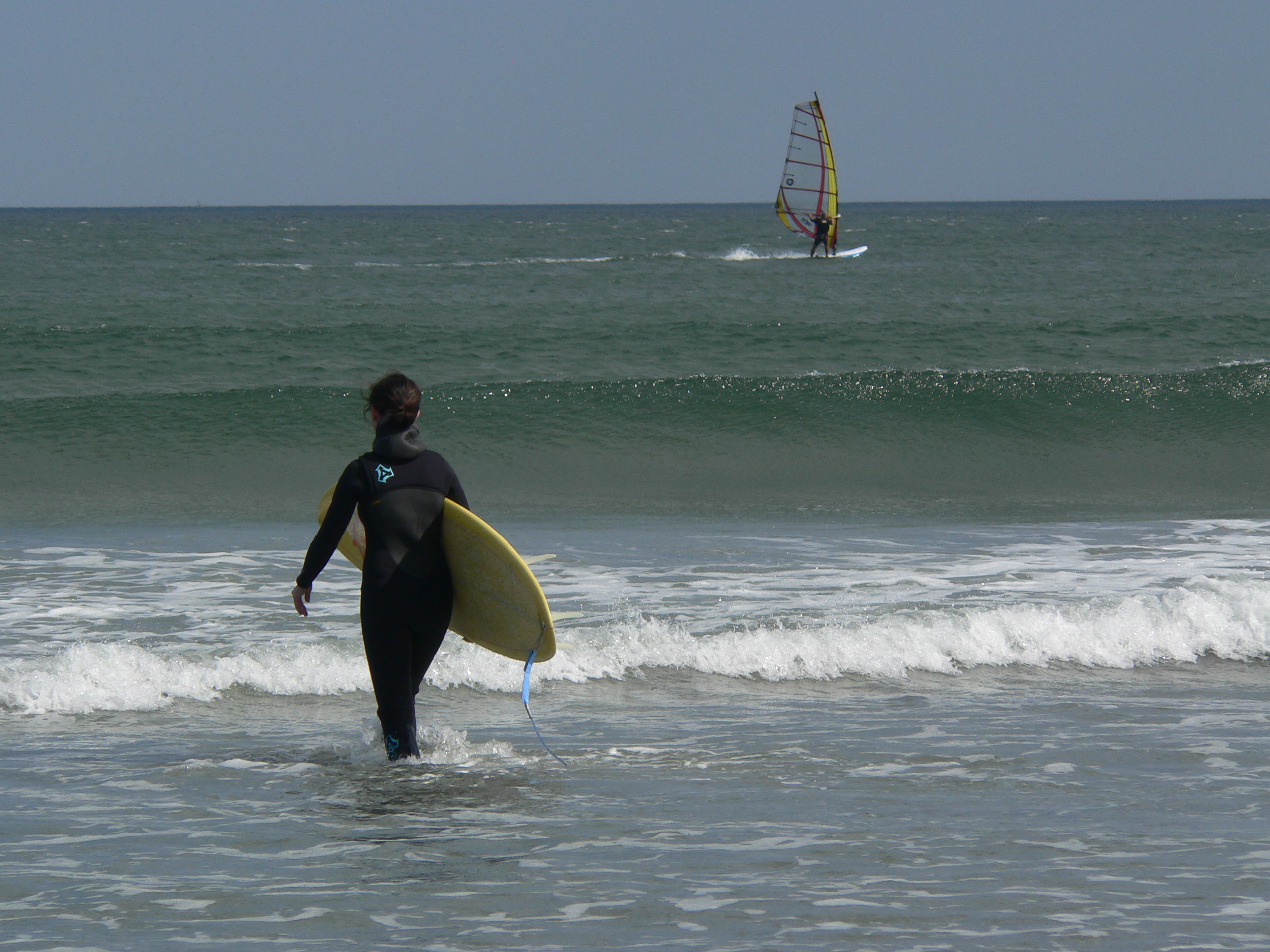
surfer

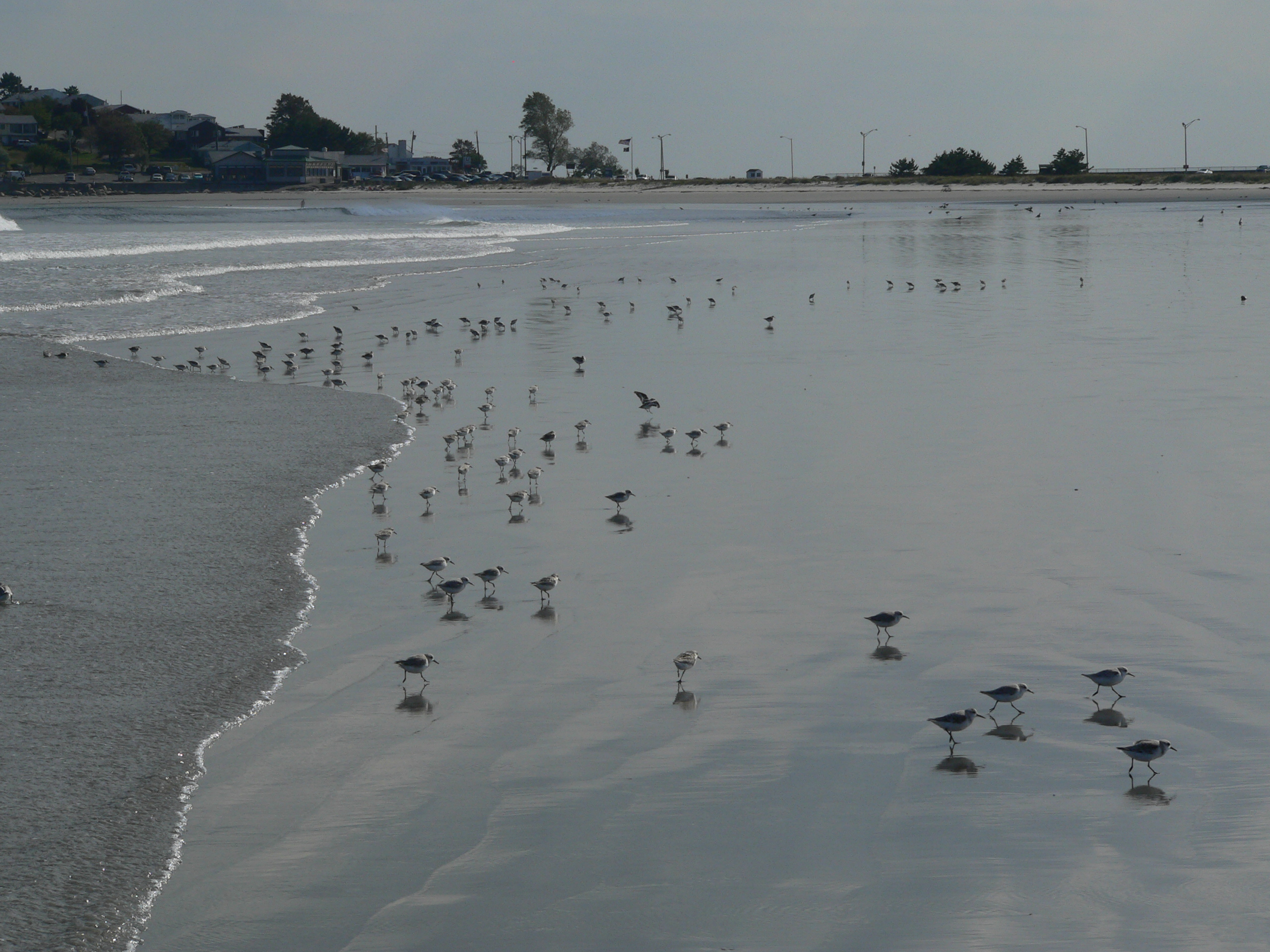
shorebirds, with Little Nahant in the distance

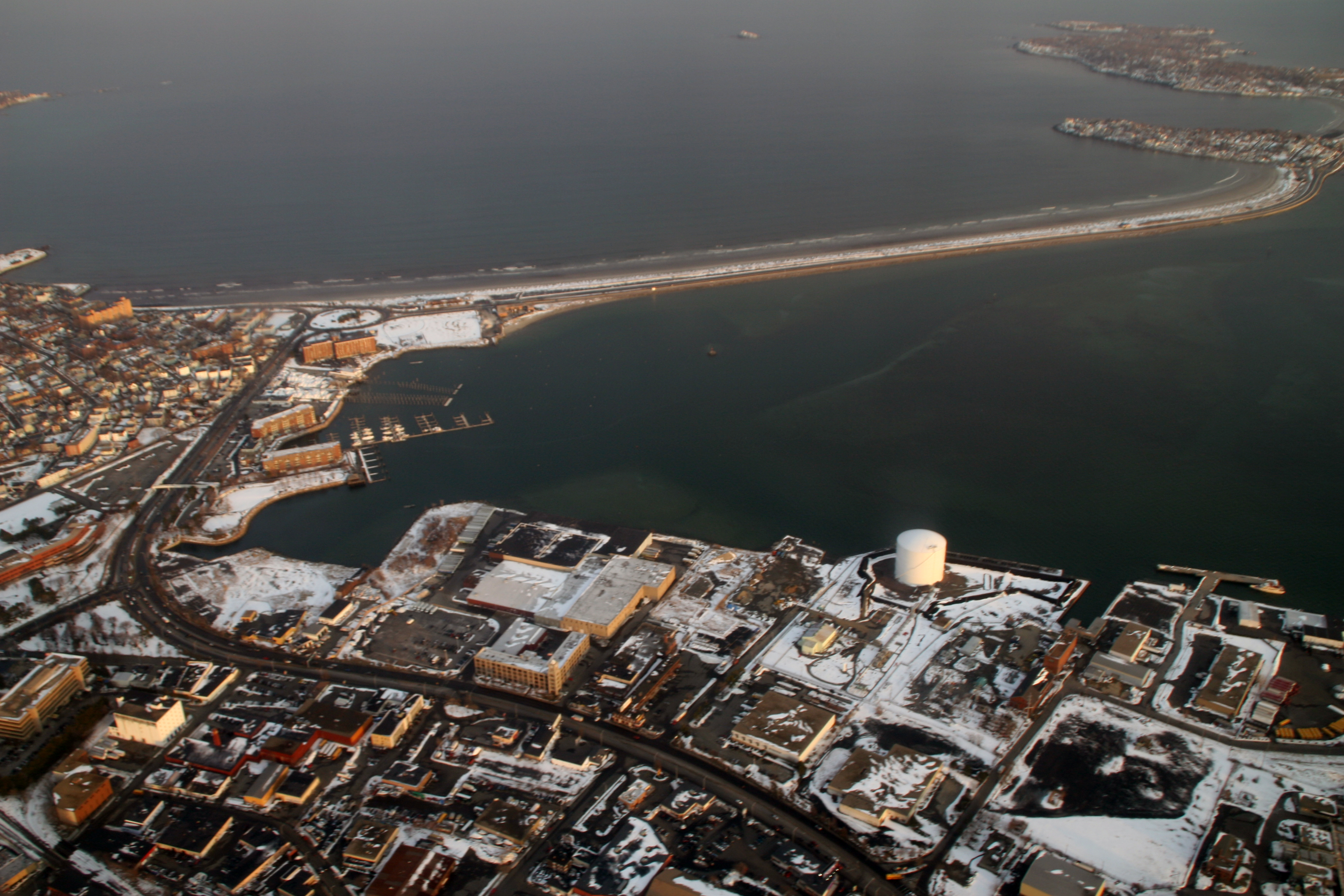
aerial view
