= Metropolitan Park System of Greater Boston =

Park system in Massachusetts

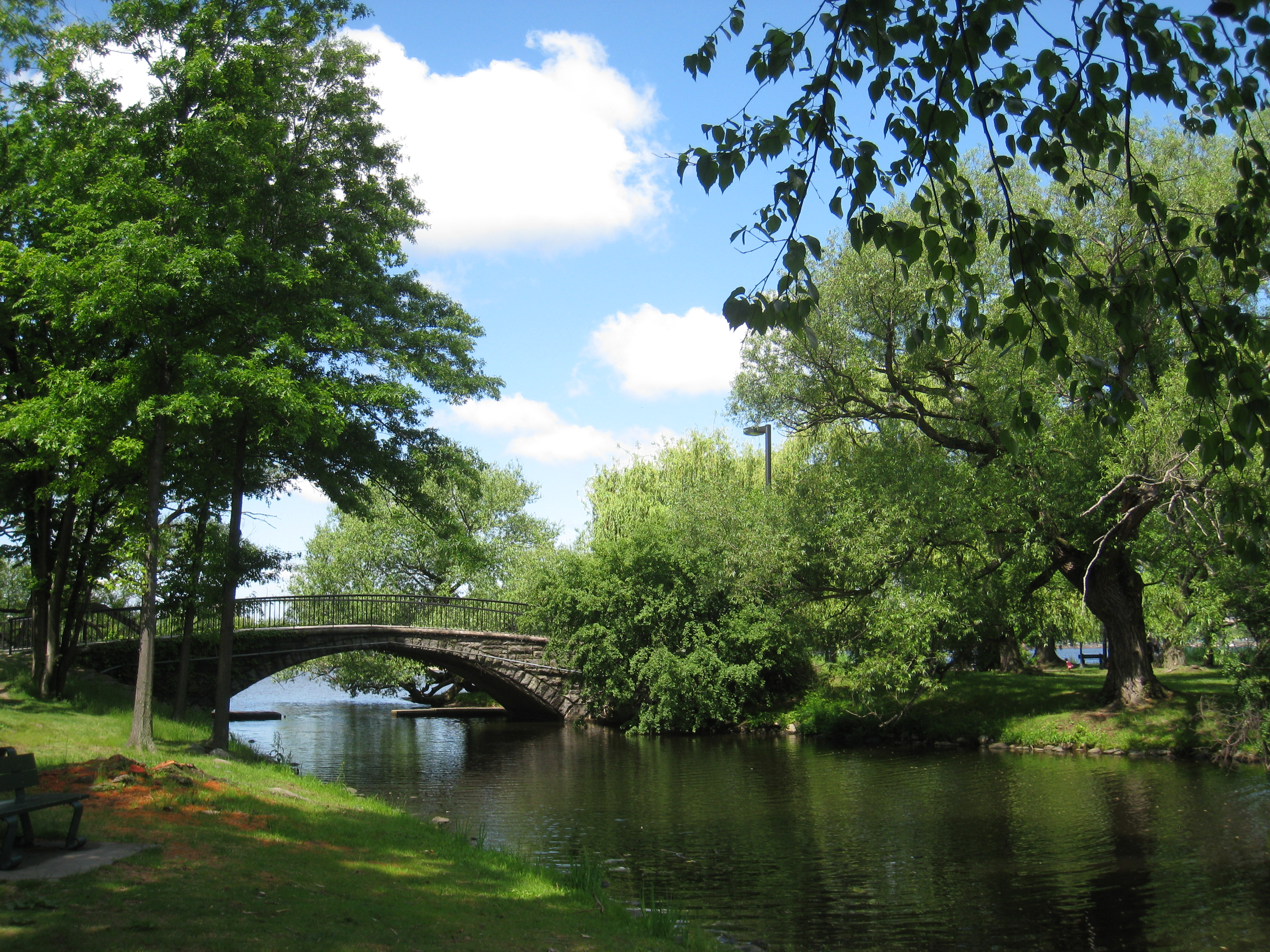
Pedestrian bridge, Charles River Esplanade, Boston, Massachusetts

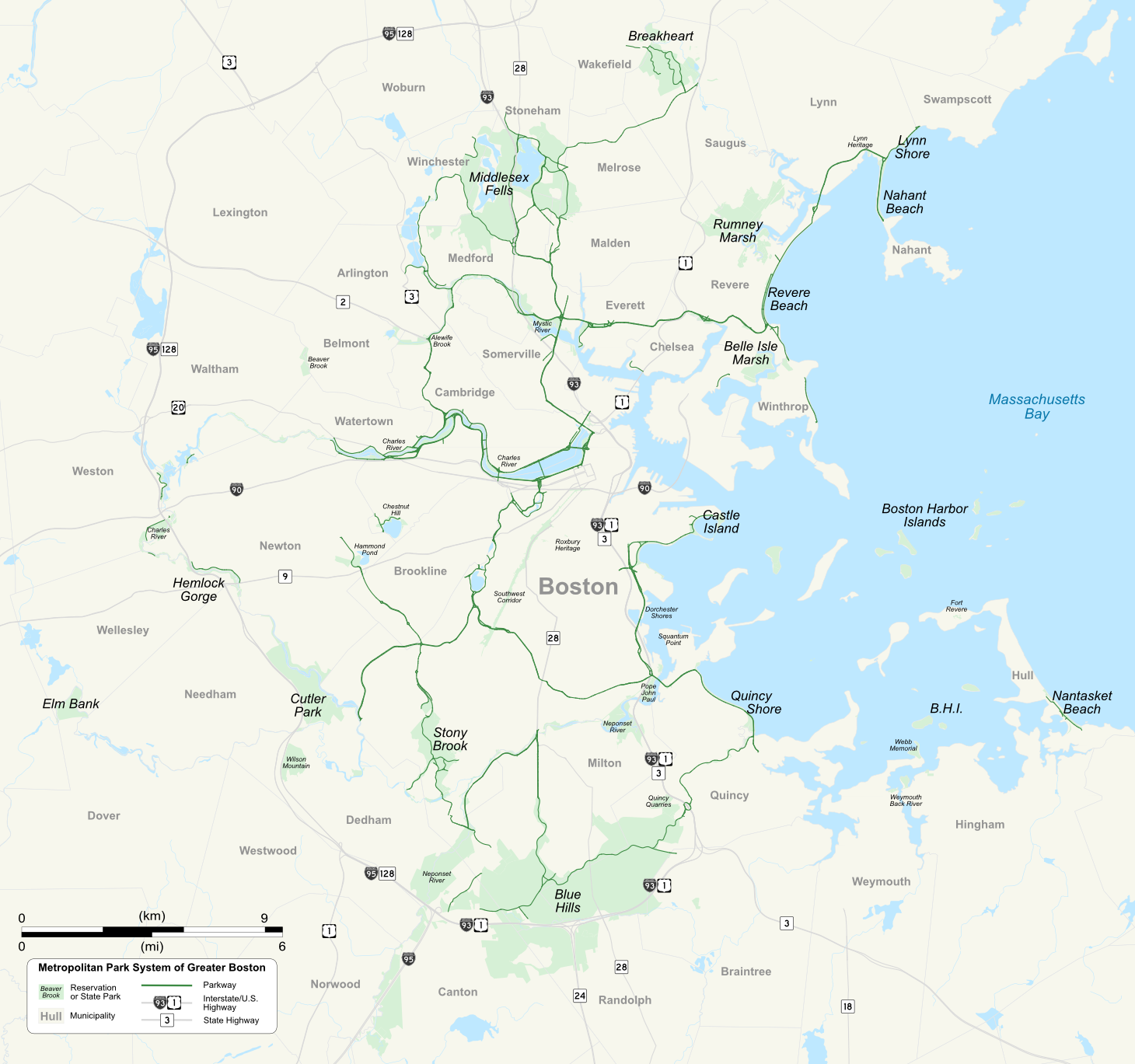
Metropolitan Park System map

The Metropolitan Park System of Greater Boston is a system of reservations, parks, parkways and roads under the control of the Massachusetts Department of Conservation and Recreation (DCR) in and around Boston that has been in existence for over a century. The title is used by the DCR to describe the areas collectively: "As a whole, the Metropolitan Park System is currently eligible for listing on the National Register of Historic Places", as outlined on the department's website. The DCR maintains a separate Urban Parks and Recreation division to oversee the system, one of five such divisions within the department—DCR's Bureau of State Parks and Recreation manages the remainder of Massachusetts state parks. Direct design and maintenance functions for the parkways and roads within the system are provided by the DCR Bureau of Engineering.

The park system consists of coastal reservations and beaches including Revere Beach, river reservations along the three major rivers in the area, such as the Charles River Reservation, and woodland reservations exemplified by Blue Hills Reservation south of the city. In addition, parks focusing on local history are located in Lynn and Roxbury. The DCR also manages a system of parkways which serve to connect the urban public to the open spaces; among these are busy streets such as Jamaicaway in Boston as well as secluded park roadways in uninhabited areas such as the Blue Hills Reservation Parkways.

== History ==
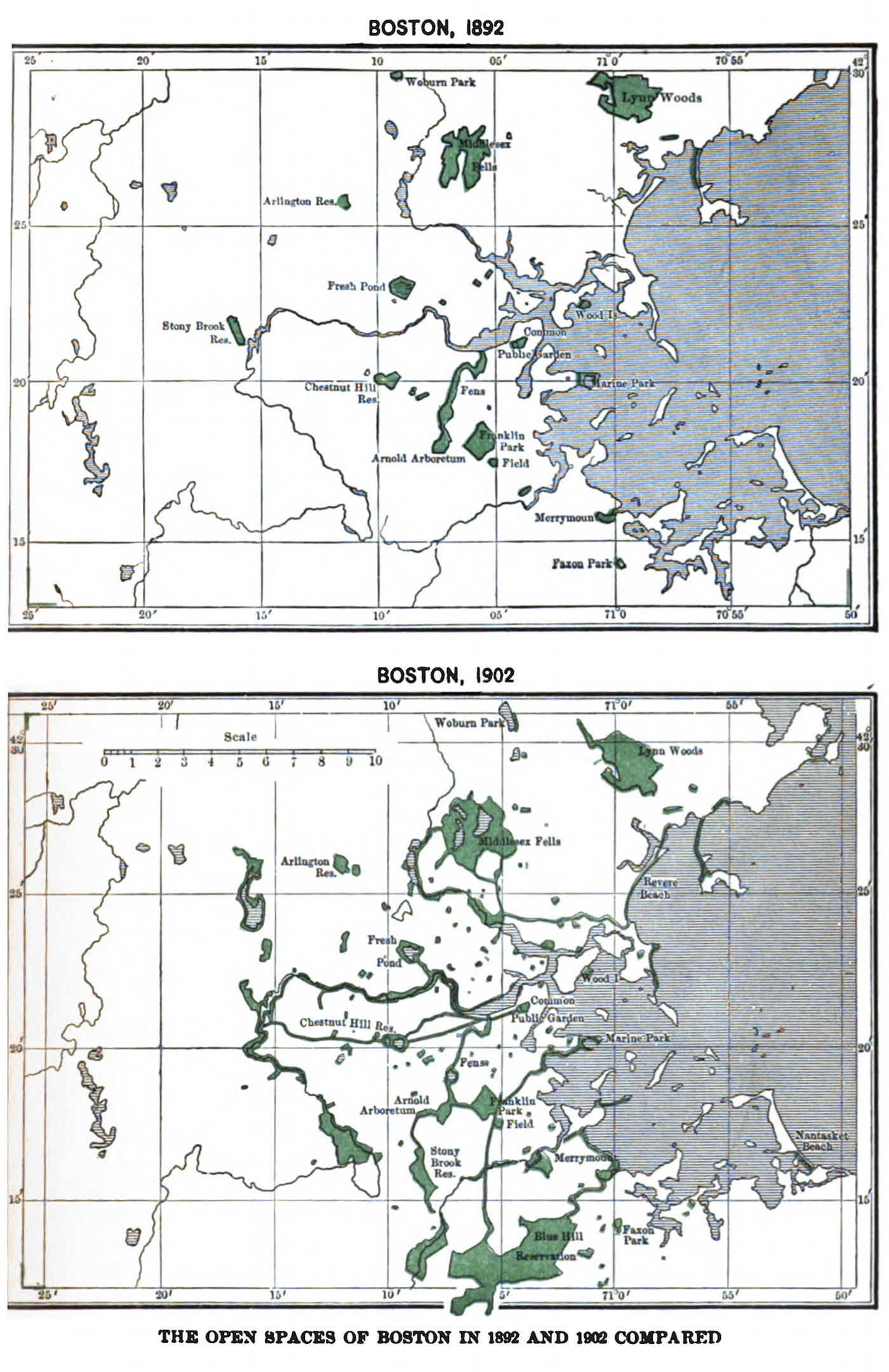
The open spaces of Boston in 1892 and 1902 compared in an illustration from a biography of Charles Eliot

The improvement of areas of undeveloped land, detrimental development, and polluted land in and around Boston for a system of interconnected parks was first conceived and promoted by landscape architects Charles Eliot and Warren H. Manning, as well as Sylvester Baxter, a Boston newspaper writer and city planning enthusiast. Eliot and Manning had apprenticed with Frederick Law Olmsted and Eliot later assumed leadership of Olmsted's design firm in 1893, with Manning leaving the firm in 1896. Olmsted had been responsible for the development of Central Park in Manhattan and with Eliot had worked to create Boston's Emerald Necklace, a string of connected parks and waterways. Eliot and Manning were instrumental in the founding of The Trustees of Public Reservations (now The Trustees of Reservations) and the public Metropolitan Parks Commission in the 1890s and envisioned an expansion of the parks network to areas surrounding Boston.

The Metropolitan Park Commission was established in 1892 and appointed by the legislature. It consisted of Charles Francis Adams, Jr., Philip A. Chase and William B. de las Casas. The commission hired Baxter to serve as secretary and Eliot as landscape architect.

The first five areas acquired by the commission for the system in 1893 were the Beaver Brook, Blue Hills, Hemlock Gorge, Middlesex Fells and Stony Brook Reservations. By 1900, the system had expanded to include several constructed or planned parkways and added beach reservations at King's Beach in Lynn, Nantasket Beach in Hull, Quincy Shore, Revere Beach, and reservations along the Charles, Mystic and Neponset Rivers. Architect William D. Austin designed many buildings for the commission.

In 1919, the commission was renamed the Metropolitan District Commission (MDC) after merging with the Metropolitan Water and Sewer Commission. Through the next 80 years the MDC became increasingly politicized and known as a haven for political patronage. Following a series of failures within the commission resulting in the pollution of Boston Harbor in the 1970s, the City of Quincy sued the MDC and the separate Boston Water and Sewer Commission in 1982, charging unchecked systemic pollution of the city’s waterfront. That suit was followed by one by the Conservation Law Foundation and finally by the United States Government, resulting in a landmark court-ordered cleanup of Boston Harbor. The lawsuits forced then Massachusetts Governor Michael Dukakis to propose separating the water and sewer treatment divisions from the MDC, resulting in the creation of the Massachusetts Water Resources Authority in 1985. Charges of political corruption and patronage continued to follow the MDC, while the loss of revenue from removal of the payments brought in by water and sewer services created a need for increased funding from the state legislature. The situation resulted in calls for the dismantlement of the MDC, which was realized when the MDC was dissolved by legislation in 2003. The Metropolitan Park System and other operations of the MDC were merged with the Massachusetts Department of Environmental Management to form the current Department of Conservation and Recreation. In 2009, a study concerning the transfer of DCR managed roadways to the Massachusetts Department of Transportation was begun, following the transfer of all DCR non-pedestrian bridges as part of a major transportation reform law enacted that year.

== Parks and reservations ==
The following table lists parks and reservations currently owned and maintained by the DCR Division of Urban Parks and Recreation, subdivided into sections based on environment as stated by the DCR, with year of formation, location within municipalities, site area and primary activities listed:

Metropolitan parks and reservations
Coastal
| Name | Year formed | Municipalities | Area in acres (hectares) | Activities |
| Belle Isle Marsh | 1985 | Boston | 241 (98) | Hiking, Scenery |
| Boston Harbor Islands | 1970 | Boston, Hingham, Quincy, Weymouth | 404 (163) | Boating, Camping, Fishing, History, Picnicking, Scenery, Swimming, Walking |
| Castle Island | 1962 | Boston | 22 (8.9) | Fishing, History, Picnicking, Scenery, Swimming, Walking |
| Dorchester Shores | 1988 | Boston | 41.3 (16.7) | Fishing, Picnicking, Swimming |
| Fort Revere Park | 1988 | Hull | 8 (3.2) | Events, History, Scenery |
| Lynn Shore | 1896 | Lynn | 22 (8.9) | Biking, Birding, Fishing, Playing Fields, Swimming |
| Nahant Beach | ~1900 | Nahant | 66.5 (26.9) | Boating, Fishing, Playing Fields, Swimming |
| Nantasket Beach | 1899 | Hull | 26 (11) | Biking, Swimming, Walking |
| Quincy Shore | 1899 | Quincy | 86 (35) | Biking, Fishing, Picnicking, Running, Swimming, Walking |
| Revere Beach | 1896 | Revere | 84 (34) | Fishing, Picnicking, Playground, Swimming |
| Rumney Marsh | 1992 | Saugus | 600 (240) | Birding, Fishing, Hiking, Kayaking |
| Webb Memorial State Park | 1977 | Weymouth | 36 (15) | Canoeing, Picnicking, Scenery, Walking |
| Weymouth Back River | 1987 | Hingham, Weymouth | 35 (14) | Birding, Fishing, Hiking, Soccer |
River
| Alewife Brook | 1906 | Arlington, Cambridge | 120 (49) | Birding, Hiking, Playing Fields, Running, Tennis |
| Charles River | 1896 | Boston, Cambridge, Dover, Needham, Newton, Watertown, Wellesley, Weston | 870 (350) | Athletic Fields, Boating, Canoeing, Concerts, Running, Sailing, Tennis, Walking |
| Chestnut Hill | 2002 | Boston | 120 (49) | Fishing, History, Swimming Pool, Skating, Walking |
| Cutler Park | 1962 | Dedham, Needham, Newton | 700 (280) | Hiking, Picnicking |
| Elm Bank | 1995 | Dover | 182 (74) | Birding, Fishing, Hiking, Kayaking, Museum |
| Hemlock Gorge | 1895 | Needham, Newton | 23 (9.3) | Hiking, Picnicking |
| Mystic River | 1896 | Arlington, Everett, Medford, Somerville | 396 (160) | Biking, Boating, Hiking, Rowing, Running, Sailing, Soccer, Swimming, Tennis |
| Neponset River | 1896 | Boston, Canton, Milton | 750 (300) | Birding, Boating, Fishing, Hiking, Kayaking |
| Pope John Paul II Park | 2001 | Boston | 66 (27) | Birding, Hiking, Kayaking, Running, Soccer |
| Squantum Point Park | 2001 | Quincy | 25 (10) | Birding, Canoeing, Inline Skating, Running, Scenery |
Woodland
| Beaver Brook | 1893 | Belmont, Waltham | 59 (24) | Baseball, Birding, Hiking, Picnicking |
| Blue Hills | 1893 | Braintree, Canton, Milton, Quincy, Randolph | 7,000 (2,800) | Camping, Fishing, Horseback Riding, Mountain Biking, Rock Climbing, Skiing, Swimming |
| Breakheart | 1934 | Saugus, Wakefield | 640 (260) | Biking, Fishing, Hiking, Skiing, Swimming |
| Hammond Pond | 1938 | Newton | 59 (24) | Fishing, Hiking, Rock Climbing |
| Middlesex Fells | 1894 | Malden, Medford, Melrose, Stoneham, Winchester | 2,575 (1,042) | Canoeing, Fishing, Horseback Riding, Kayaking, Mountain Biking, Rock Climbing, Skiing |
| Quincy Quarries | 1985 | Quincy | 22 (8.9) | Hiking, Picnicking, Rock Climbing, Scenery |
| Southwest Corridor Park | 1987 | Boston | 52 (21) | Basketball, Biking, Tennis, Walking |
| Stony Brook | 1894 | Boston, Dedham | 475 (192) | Baseball, Biking, Fishing, Hiking, Picnicking, Swimming Pool, Skating Rink, Tennis |
| Wilson Mountain | 1995 | Dedham | 213 (86) | Birding, Hiking |
Heritage
| Lynn Heritage State Park | 1990 | Lynn | 4.2 (1.7) | History, Scenery, Walking |
| Roxbury Heritage State Park | 1992 | Roxbury | 2.2 (0.89) | Architectural History, Community Programs, History |
