= Wilson Mountain Reservation =

Protected area in Dedham, Massachusetts

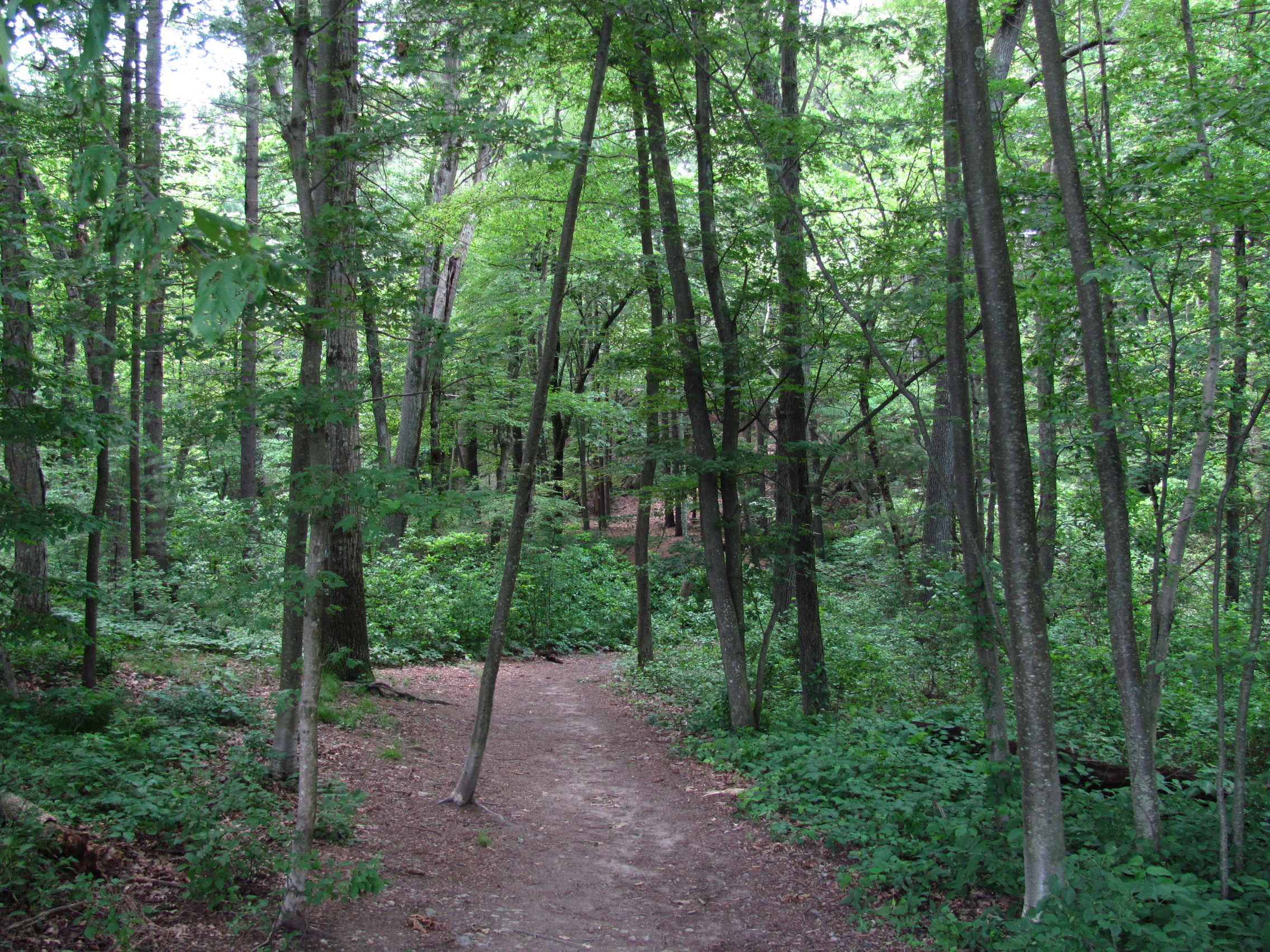

- Location within Massachusetts Location within the United States
- Location: Dedham, Massachusetts, United States
- Coordinates: 42°15′26″N 71°12′06″W
- Area: 215 acres (87 ha)
- Elevation: 279 ft (85 m)
- Established: 1994
- Administrator: Massachusetts Department of Conservation and Recreation
- Website: Official website

Wilson Mountain Reservation is a public recreation area and protected woodland park in Dedham, Massachusetts, managed by the Massachusetts Department of Conservation and Recreation. It features hiking trails, open space and a summit view of the Boston skyline, and is an important wildlife preserve. At 215 acres (87 ha), it is the largest remaining open space in Dedham. The reservation is part of the Metropolitan Park System of Greater Boston.

In 2008, an agreement was reached between DCR and The Trustees of Reservations to "work jointly to increase stewardship of the property". However, the 2017 DCR Resource Management Plan for Wilson Mountain called for DCR and The Trustees "to clarify status of the 2008 Memorandum of Agreement and, if appropriate, develop a work plan for future stewardship activities."

== Gallery ==
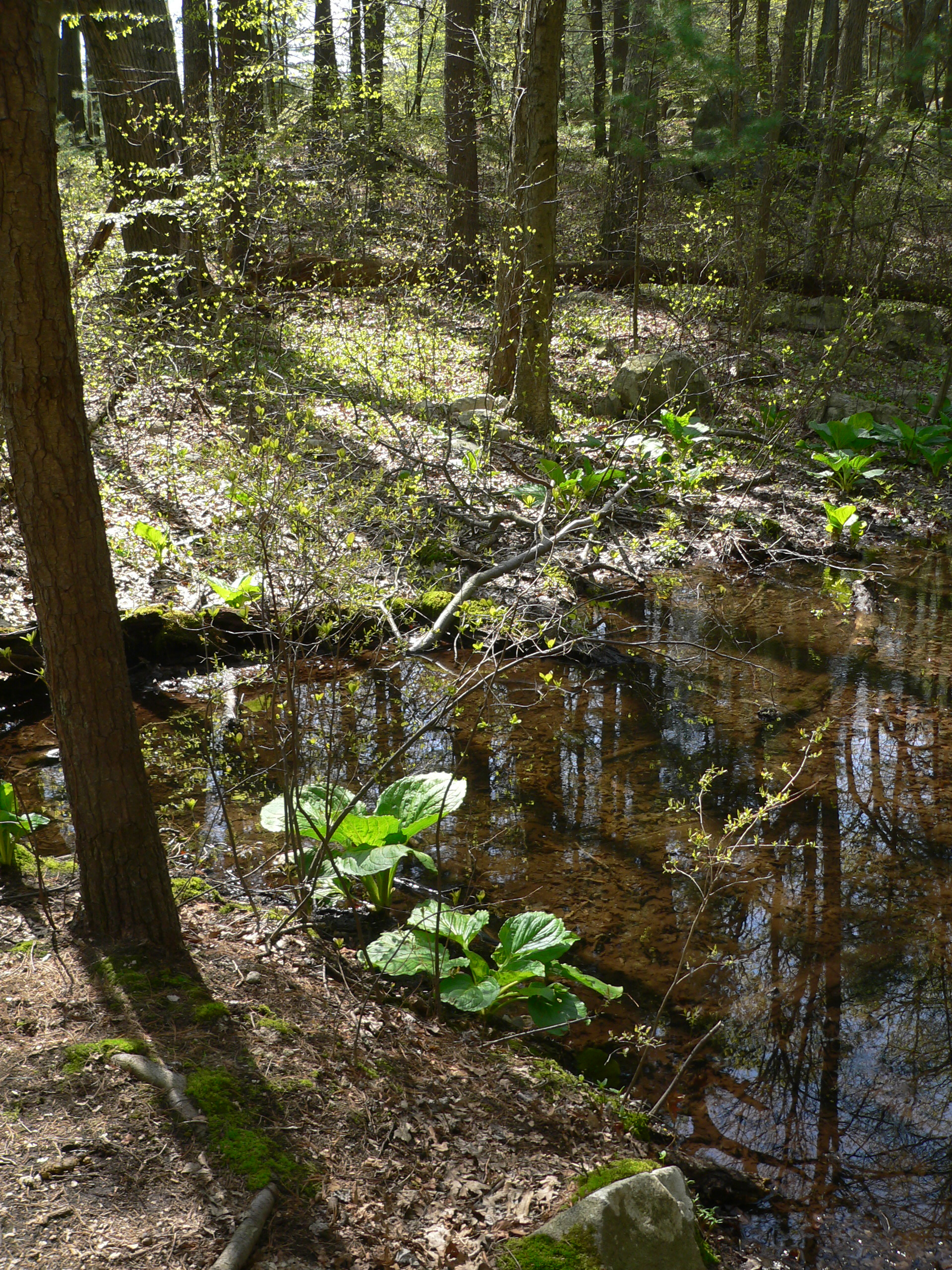

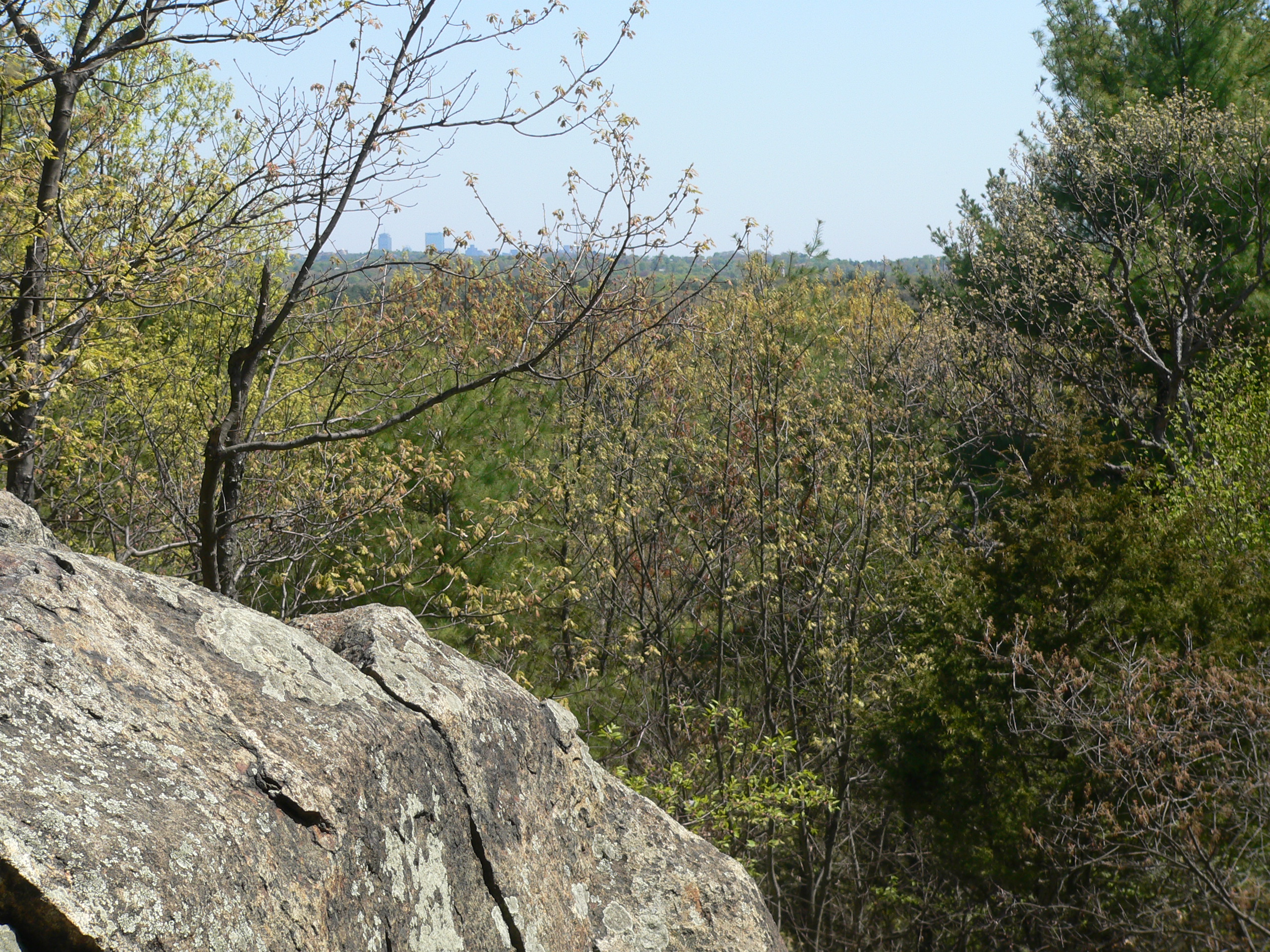
View of Boston skyline from summit

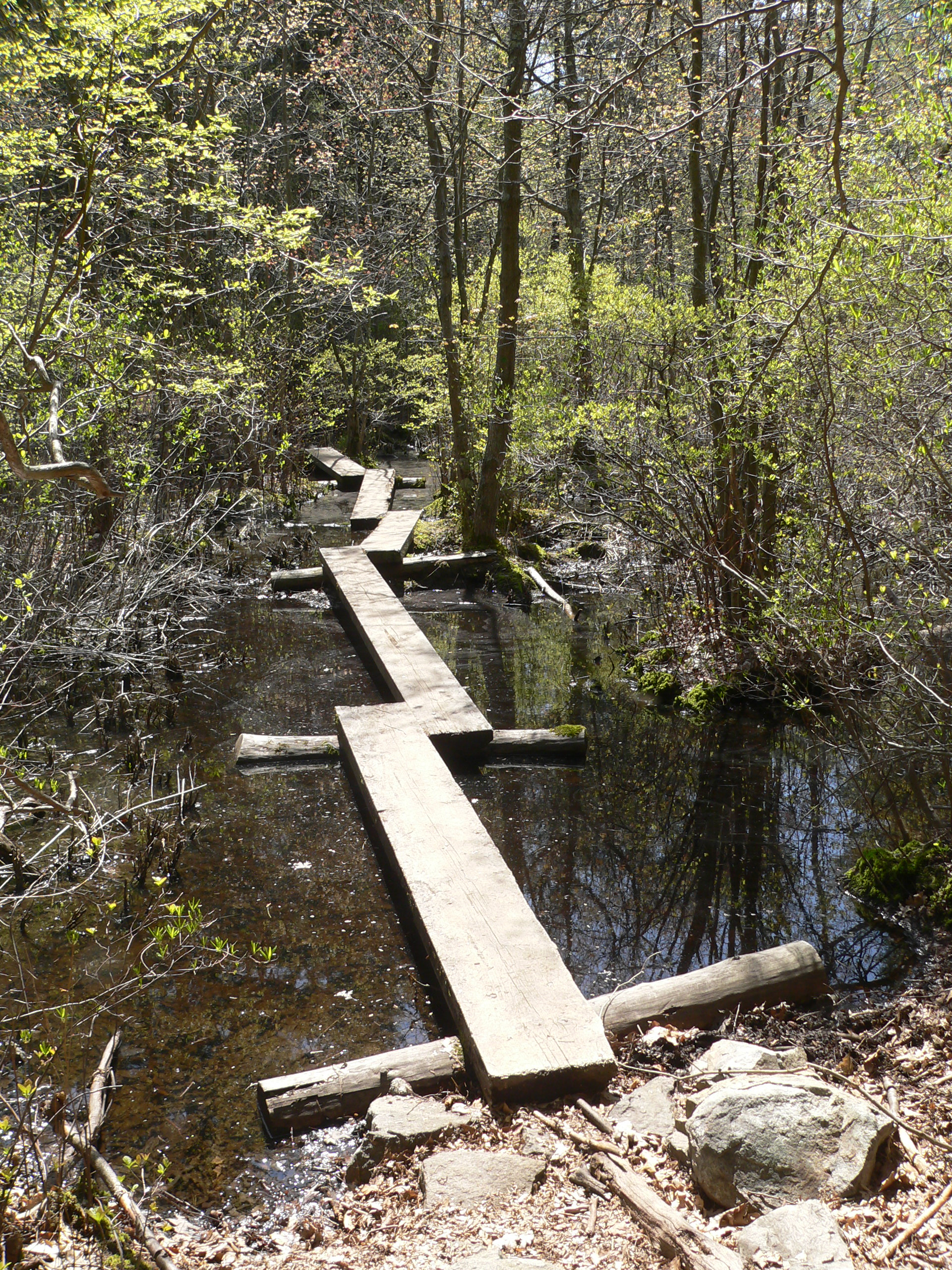
