= Broad Sound (Massachusetts) =

Bay in Massachusetts, United States

Coordinates: 42.40°N 70.95°W

Broad Sound is a bay on the Massachusetts coast north of Boston. It lies on the west of Massachusetts Bay, between Nahant and Deer Island; Lynn harbor is at its north end. The main channel of Boston Harbor empties into the sound.
