= Henry Cabot Lodge House =

Historic house in Massachusetts, United States

- U.S. National Register of Historic Places
- U.S. National Historic Landmark
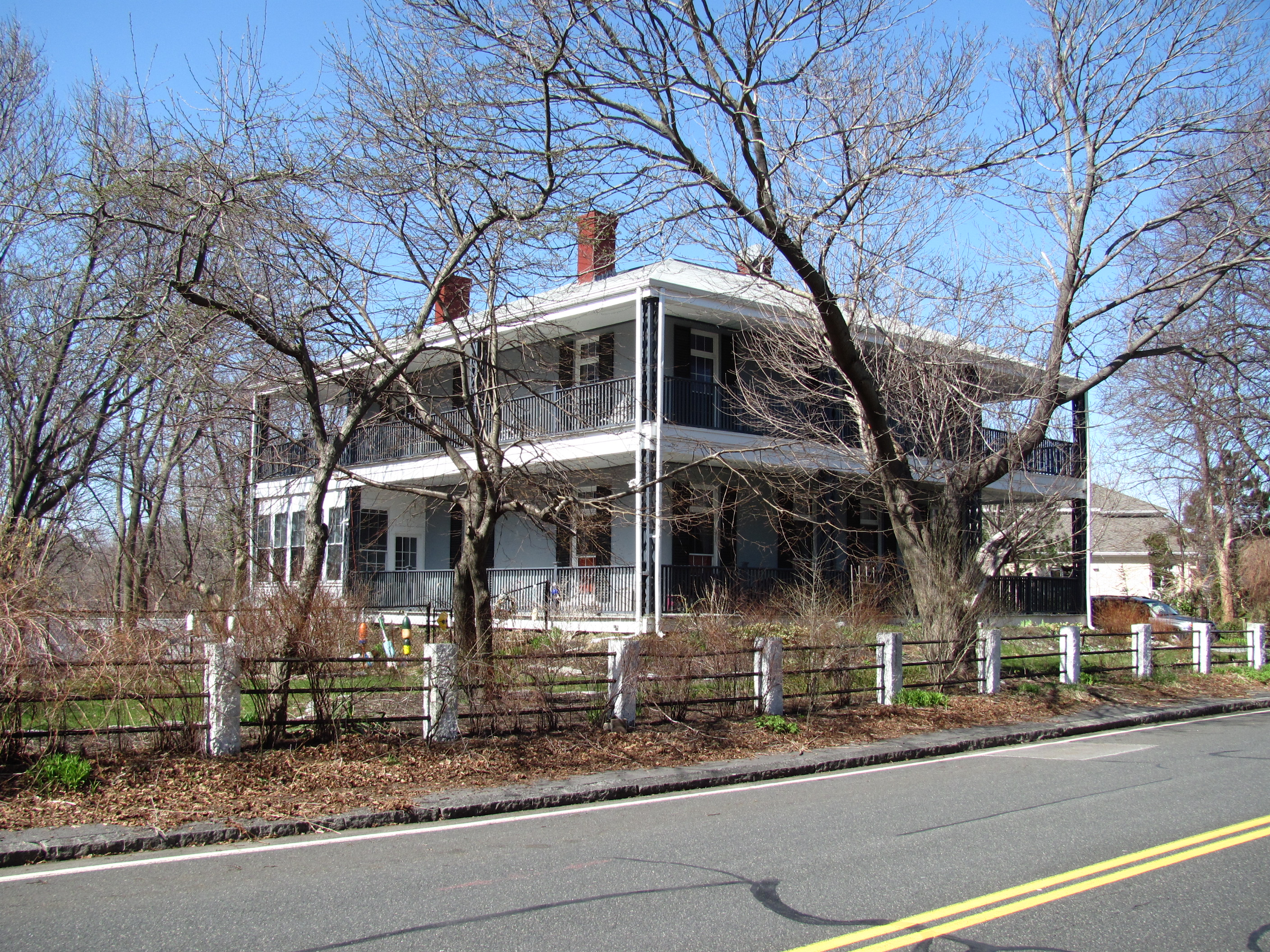
- Henry Cabot Lodge House

- Location within Massachusetts Location within the United States
- Location: Nahant, Massachusetts
- Coordinates: 42°25′18″N 70°54′39″W
- Built: 1850
- NRHP reference No.: 76001971
- Added to NRHP: December 8, 1976

The Henry Cabot Lodge House is a National Historic Landmark at 5 Cliff Street in Nahant, Massachusetts. It was designated as the only known residential building associated with United States Senator Henry Cabot Lodge (1850–1924). Lodge was a leading Republican politician who was a longtime associate of President Theodore Roosevelt, and an influential figure who led the successful opposition to the ratification of the Treaty of Versailles that ended World War I.

It is unclear exactly when and for whom the Henry Cabot Lodge House was built. It was known to be owned by Lodge's grandfather Henry in 1850, although local historians believe it was built c. 1820 by Lodge's father John. Stylistically the house is unusual for New England, and is based on a type of plantation house popular in the West Indies in the late 19th century. The house was used by the Lodge family as a summer house after the main Lodge residence (since torn down) was built at Nahant's East Point, and both Lodge and his like-named grandson reported spending childhood years at the house. The house was sold out of the Lodge family after the elder Lodge's death.

The house is a two-story brick structure measuring about 50 feet (15 m) by 48 feet (15 m), resting on a brick foundation that is set in a low artificial earthen mound. The exterior walls have been stuccoed, and the roof is a low pitch hip roof pierced by four slender chimneys. The building is encircled by a two-story veranda, which is sheltered by the roof and supported by twelve latticework pillars (four at the corners and two additional ones on each side). On the western corner of the first floor the veranda has been closed in to provide a sun room.

The house was designated a National Historic Landmark and listed on the National Register of Historic Places in 1976.

== See also ==
- National Register of Historic Places listings in Essex County, Massachusetts
- List of National Historic Landmarks in Massachusetts
