= Nahant Life-Saving Station =

Historic building in Massachusetts, United States

- U.S. National Register of Historic Places

- Location within Massachusetts Location within the United States
- Location: 96 Nahant Road, Nahant, Massachusetts
- Coordinates: 42°25′51″N 70°56′1″W
- Built: 1900
- Architect: Victor Mendelheff
- NRHP reference No.: 12000133
- Added to NRHP: March 20, 2012

The Nahant Life-Saving Station is a historic coastal rescue station in Nahant, Massachusetts. The station, which consists of a residence and an equipment building, was established in 1900 by the United States Life-Saving Service before being taken over by the United States Coast Guard in 1915. The station was discontinued in 1964, and the facilities were converted to recreational use by the Coast Guard. In 1999 the 1.4 acres (0.57 ha) parcel was turned over to the Town of Nahant. The station, one of twelve such surviving facilities in the state, was listed on the National Register of Historic Places in 2012.

== Description and history ==
The town of Nahant is located on a tied island connected to the south shore of Cape Ann by a sandy north-south causeway. Near the southern end of this causeway there is an eastward projection known as Little Nahant. The Nahant Life-Saving Station is located on the east side of the causeway between Little Nahant and the rest of Nahant. The main station house is an imposing two-story wood frame structure, with a square tower at the southwest corner. The building is in the Shingle style, with a hip roof that is pierced by hip-roof dormers and a large cross-gabled section. The front facade has two inset porches with Tuscan columns at the sides. The interior of the building was originally arranged with the keeper's residence in the north, crew quarters in the south, and a boat and equipment storage area in the center. The east facade has two pairs of double-doors for moving boats out to Nahant Bay to the east, while the west side has a single double door (between the porches) for launching boats to the west. This structure was built in 1900 by the United States Life-Saving Service to a design by Victor Mendeleff. To the main station's southeast is an equipment building, essentially a four-bay garage with Colonial Revival details; it was built in 1938 by the Coast Guard.

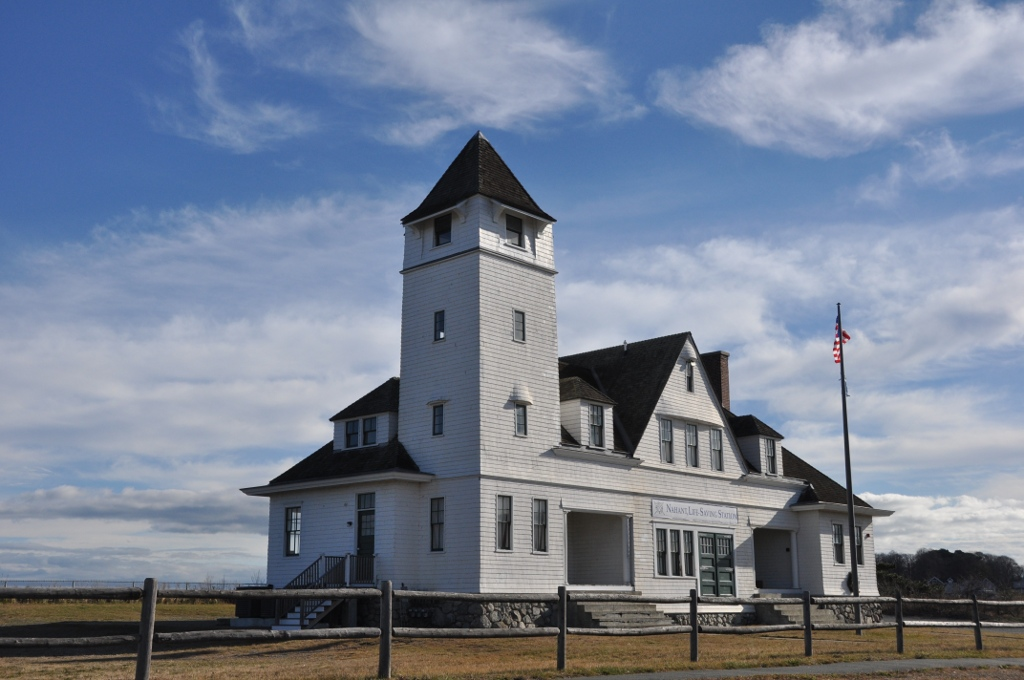
Nahant Life Saving Station after restoration

The station was established in 1900, and was one of 33 such stations built in the state. It is the only one that appears to not have been built to a standard plan, and is one of only twelve to survive in any significant form. It was in service until 1964, longer than any other in the state except for the Point Allerton Station (which is now a museum). The Coast Guard converted the building to a recreational facility in 1964, and in 1999 turned it over to the town.

The town leased the building to the Nahant Preservaiton Trust, who restored the building beginning in 2005, and held a rededication on May 1, 2012. The building would be used as a community space, housing American Legion Post Mortimer Robbin, a function room in the former boat room, and rental space on the second level.

In 2026 the Life Saving Station reverted back to the red roof color that was in place when the Coast Guard took over in 1915.

== See also ==
- National Register of Historic Places listings in Essex County, Massachusetts
