= Egg Rock (Nahant Bay) =

Island in Essex County, Massachusetts, USA

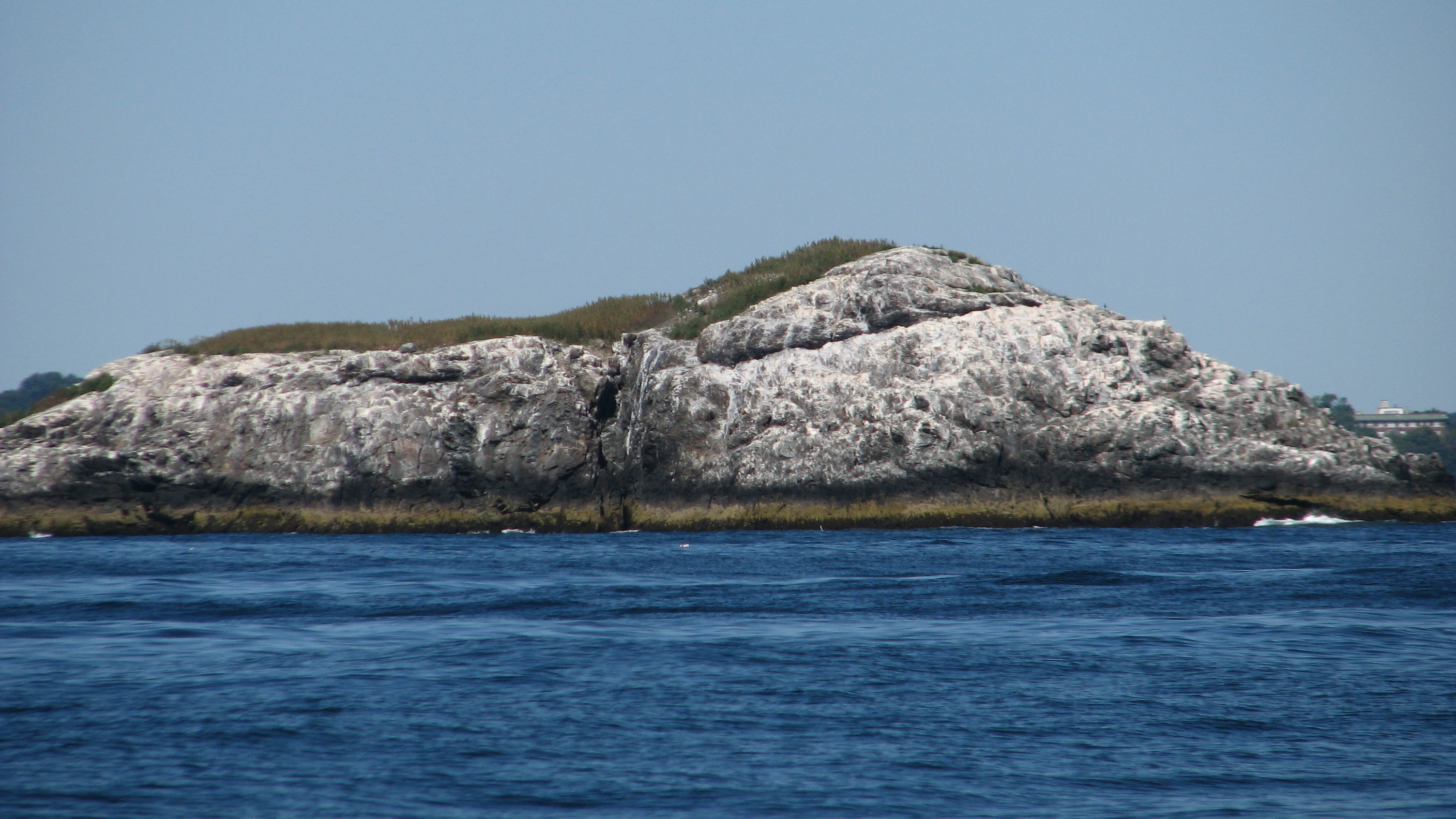
Egg Rock

Egg Rock (sometimes called Elephant Rock) in Nahant Bay near Nahant, Massachusetts is a small (3-acre; 1.2 ha) island at 42.4333°N 70.8978°W. It was formerly the site of a lighthouse known as Egg Rock Light but now is owned by the Commonwealth of Massachusetts as a bird sanctuary. Egg Rock can be seen clearly from the coasts of Nahant, Swampscott, and Lynn. Egg Rock is the setting for Sylvia Plath's poem "Suicide off Egg Rock", and also appears in her novel, The Bell Jar.
