= Nahant Bay =

Atlantic Ocean Bay in Massachusetts, USA

Coordinates: 42°26′30″N 70°53′58″W

Nahant Bay is an Atlantic Ocean bay, fronted by Swampscott, Lynn, and Nahant, Massachusetts. Egg Rock is located in the Nahant Bay.
