= Nahant, Massachusetts =

- Town
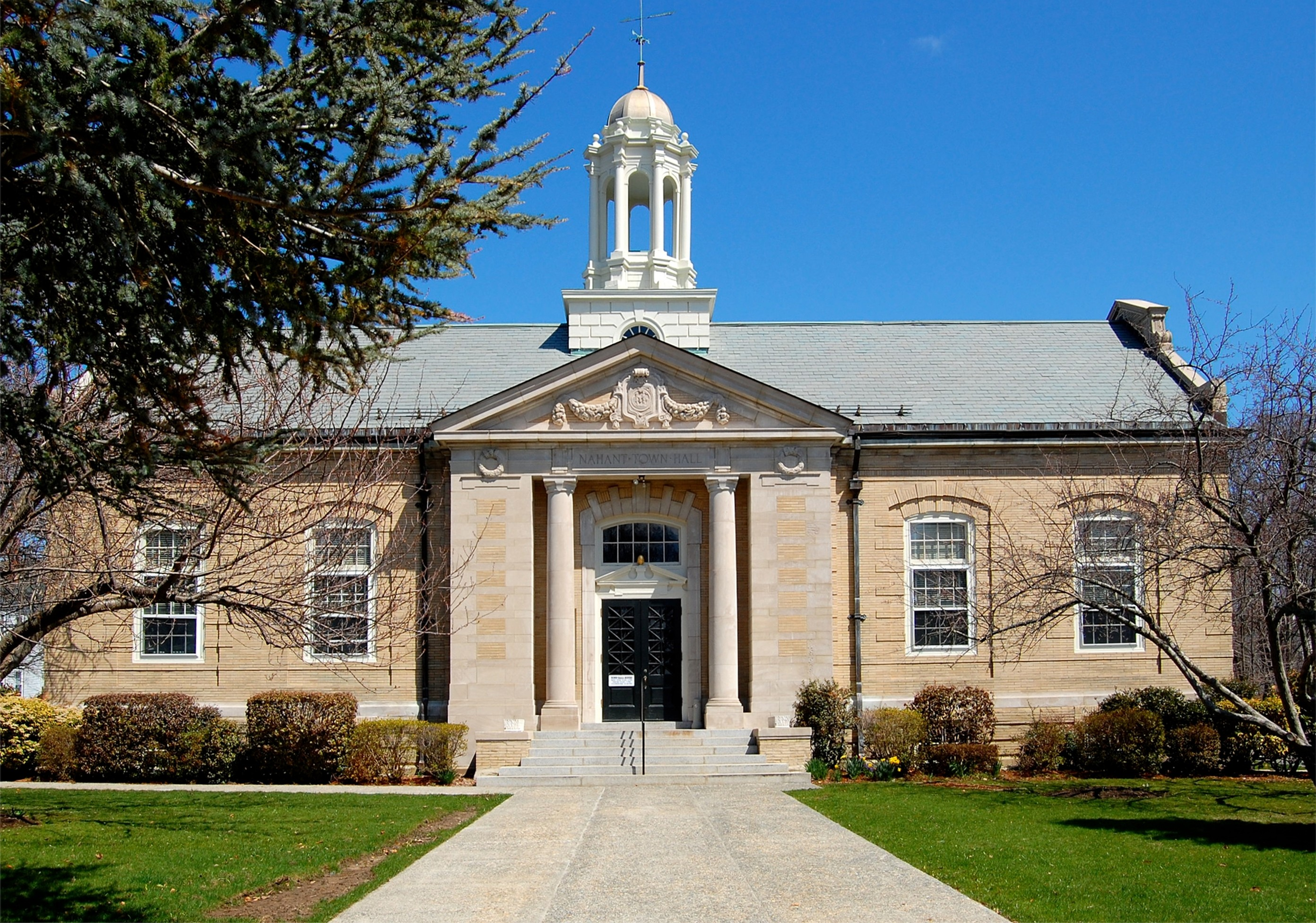
- Town Hall of Nahant

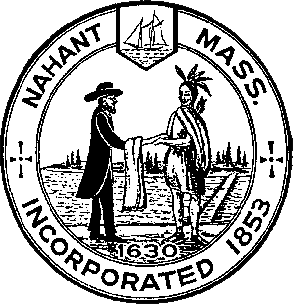
- Seal

- Location in Essex County and the state of Massachusetts.

- Location within Greater Boston area Location within Massachusetts Location within the United States
- Coordinates: 42°25′35″N 70°55′10″W
- Country: United States
- State: Massachusetts
- County: Essex
- Settled: 1630
- Incorporated: March 29, 1853

Government
  - Type: Open town meeting
  - Town Administrator: Alison Nieto

Area
  - Total: 15.5 sq mi (40.1 km^{2})
  - Land: 1.0 sq mi (2.7 km^{2})
  - Water: 14.4 sq mi (37.4 km^{2})
- Elevation: 49 ft (15 m)

Population (2020)
  - Total: 3,334
  - Density: 3,198/sq mi (1,234.8/km^{2})
- Time zone: UTC-5 (Eastern)
  - Summer (DST): UTC-4 (Eastern)
- ZIP code: 01908
- Area code: 339 / 781
- FIPS code: 25-43580
- GNIS feature ID: 0618304
- Website: www.nahant.org

Nahant (/nə.ˈhɑːnt/, nə-HAANT) is a town in Essex County, Massachusetts, United States. The population was 3,334 at the 2020 census, which makes it the smallest municipality by population in Essex County. With just 1.0 square mile (2.7 km^{2}) of land area, it is also the smallest municipality by area in the state and is primarily a residential community. The town is situated on a peninsula consisting of two near-islands (known as "Little Nahant" and "Big Nahant" respectively) connected to the mainland by a narrow sandy isthmus traversed by a single causeway known as "Nahant Road". Numerous tourist beaches line the shores, with the most popular being the so-called "Long Beach" and "Short Beach" along the eastern side of the causeway.

== History ==
The area around Nahant was inhabited for thousands of years prior to European colonization of the Americas, but little is known of this period until European records began to document the area in the early 1600s.

In 1605, Samuel de Champlain interacted briefly with native people in Nahant and remarked that "all along this coast there is much cleared land sewn with Indian corn."

By the 1630s at the time of English colonization, the seat of "Sagamore James" of the Naumkeag, known in his own tongue as Montowampate, was at the outlet of the Saugus River overlooking Nahant, though the island itself may have been controlled by a sachem Poquanum, known to English settlers as Blacke William or Duke William, who around 1632 gave permission to Thomas Dexter to use the island in exchange for an English suit. The word Nahant may mean "at the point," or "twin islands," or it may refer to an important local person named Nahantum.

The peninsula was first settled by English colonists in 1630, in the second year of the Puritan coming: the servants of Isaac Johnson grazed his cattle on the land, and it was also often used by citizens of Lynn for grazing cattle, sheep and goats. Although not a separate town until 1853, Nahant was listed as one of thirty "noted Habitations" in New England by William Wood in 1633, and Nahant Poynt appears labeled on a map of the Massachusetts coastline from 1639.

Before 1800 there were only three homes on the island: those built by the Breeds and the Hoods, and the Johnson home built by Jeremiah Gray. The first hotel was built by one of the Johnsons 1802, and in 1817 a steamboat ran daily between Boston and Nahant. The town was originally part of Lynn; when the temperance movement threatened the summer resort trade in 1853, Nahant incorporated as a separate town. In the late 19th century, it was home to some of the country's first amusement parks, as well as a popular summer retreat for the wealthy, including the poet Henry Wadsworth Longfellow. The geologist Louis Agassiz was a resident and the artist William Stanley Haseltine produced many versions of his oil painting 'The Rocks at Nahant'. During World War II, East Point was the site of a coastal artillery battery. It is now a town park, and location of the Marine Science Center for Northeastern University.

=== Development ===
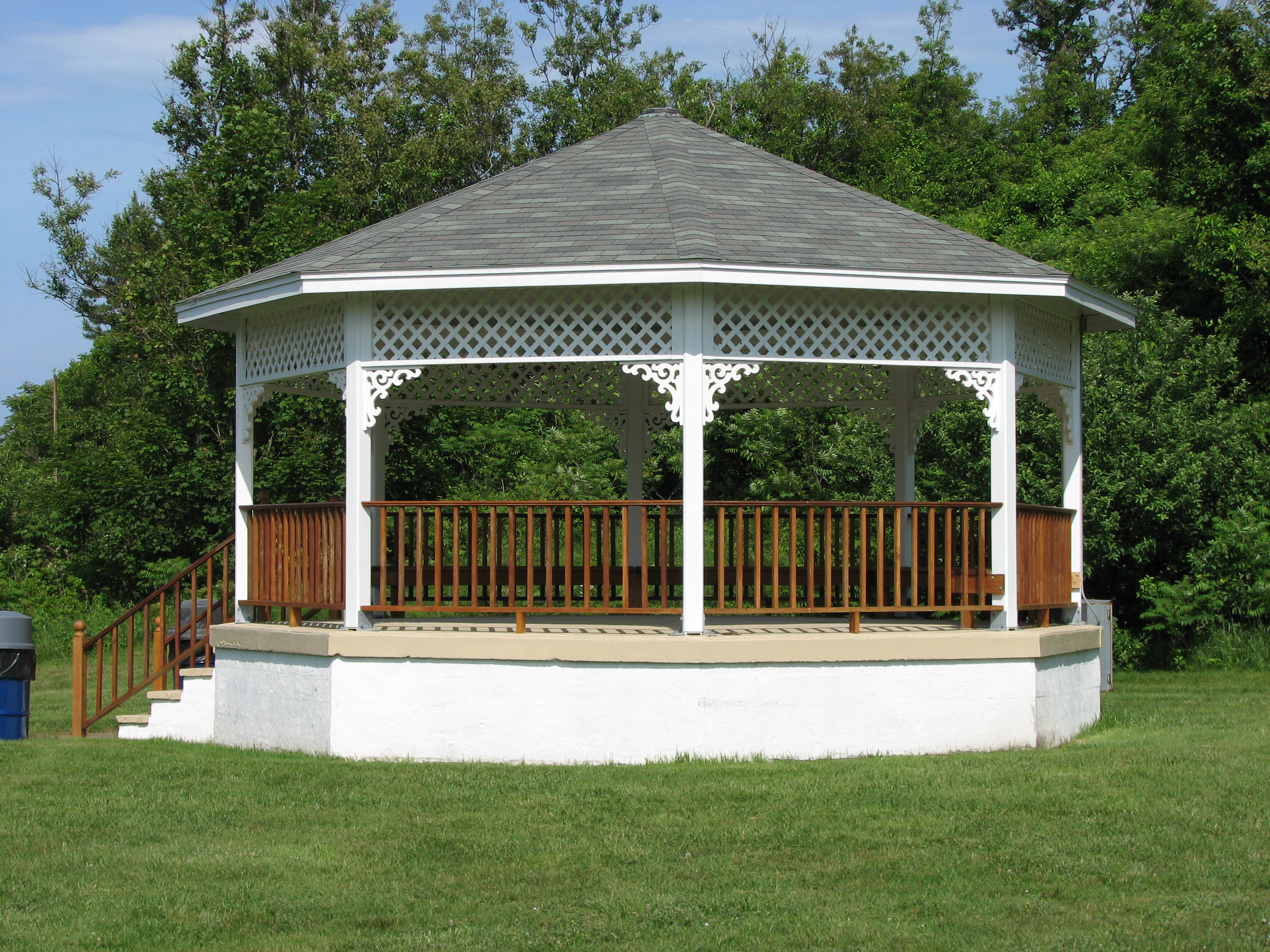
Calantha Sears Gazebo

The old Nahant Life-Saving Station (NLSS) on Nahant Road and the new War Memorial erected across the street from the NLSS were renovated in 2004.

In 2003, the dilapidated Valley Road School was refurbished and re-commissioned as the Nahant Community Center, which is now home to many local activities and banquets, including the local Boy Scout Troop 50.

On September 25, 2005, the Town of Nahant officially commemorated the completely rebuilt Bailey's Hill Gazebo as the Calantha Sears Gazebo. The original was built for the bicentennial in 1976, and over the years had fallen into disrepair. With funding from the Woman's Club of Nahant and collaboration with the town of Nahant, local residents contributed to its reconstruction. Besides the cement base, the only remaining piece of the original is the wooden cylinder in the center of the roof, which still bears the "1976" emblem—repainted by Nahant resident Octavia Randolph.

== Geography and transportation ==
According to the United States Census Bureau, the town has a total area of 15.5 square miles (40.1 km^{2}), of which 1.0 square mile (2.7 km^{2}) is land and 14.4 square miles (37.4 km^{2}), or 93.24%, is water. Nahant is a tied island connected to the mainland by a natural tombolo, effectively a peninsula though often referred to as an "island". Nahant is connected by a causeway to the city of Lynn. The town is surrounded by Nahant Bay to the east, Nahant Harbor to the south, and Lynn Harbor to the west, all of which lead directly into Broad Sound and Massachusetts Bay. The town is essentially divided into a main portion and Little Nahant, just north of the main portion of town along the eastern side of the causeway. The area along the west side of town, between Black Rock Point and Bass Point, is the most densely settled part of town. There are ten beaches along the coastline, the largest being Nahant Beach and Long Beach, both of which line the eastern side of the causeway road north of Little Nahant. Included in these ten beaches is Short beach, one of the most popular sites in the town during the summer, only accessible through a Nahant beach sticker. The town also has a few small parks and the Kelly Greens Golf Course. A few small islands stand offshore of Nahant, including Egg Rock, Pea Island, and Castle Rock.

Nahant is just one of four towns out of the 351 cities and towns in Massachusetts (along with Rockport, Provincetown and Aquinnah) that only touches one other town by land (Gosnold and Nantucket do not touch any). Only touching a 400-yard portion of Lynn by land, the water rights of the town also touch those of Revere, Winthrop and Boston, in Suffolk County. Both by land and by sea, Nahant is the southernmost town in Essex County. The town is centered 14 miles (23 km) by land northeast of Boston, 9 miles (14 km) south of Salem, and 25 miles (40 km) southwest of Cape Ann.

The nearest state route is Route 129, within Lynn. The nearest highways are a highway portion of U.S. Route 1 in Saugus and Interstate 95 and Route 128 in Peabody. The only mass transit within town is route 439 of the MBTA bus system, which runs between Nahant and Lynn station. The nearest airport to town is Boston's Logan International Airport.

== Demographics ==
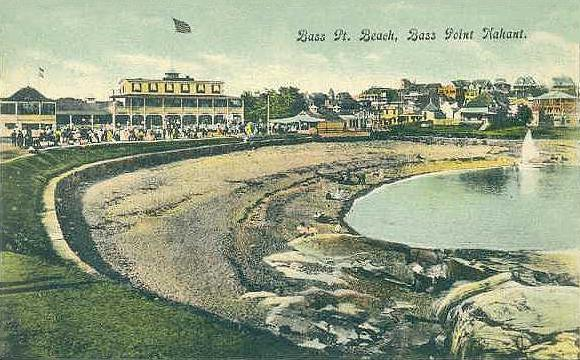
Bass Point Beach in c. 1910

Historical population
| Year | Pop. | ±% |
|---|---|---|
| 1860 | 380 | — |
| 1870 | 475 | +25.0% |
| 1880 | 808 | +70.1% |
| 1890 | 880 | +8.9% |
| 1900 | 1,152 | +30.9% |
| 1910 | 1,184 | +2.8% |
| 1920 | 1,318 | +11.3% |
| 1930 | 1,654 | +25.5% |
| 1940 | 1,835 | +10.9% |
| 1950 | 2,679 | +46.0% |
| 1960 | 3,960 | +47.8% |
| 1970 | 4,119 | +4.0% |
| 1980 | 3,947 | −4.2% |
| 1990 | 3,828 | −3.0% |
| 2000 | 3,632 | −5.1% |
| 2010 | 3,410 | −6.1% |
| 2020 | 3,334 | −2.2% |
| 2022* | 3,289 | −1.3% |
* = population estimate. Source: United States Census records and Population Estimates Program data.

As of the census of 2000, there were 3,632 people, 1,629 households, and 970 families residing in the town. The population density was 2,918.7 inhabitants per square mile (1,126.9/km^{2}). There were 1,704 housing units at an average density of 1,369.3 per square mile (528.7/km^{2}). The racial makeup of the town was 97.11% White, 0.39% Black or African American, 0.08% Native American, 1.07% Asian, 0.06% Pacific Islander, 0.47% from other races, and 0.83% from two or more races. Hispanic or Latino of any race were 1.07% of the population.

There were 1,629 households, out of which 22.5% had children under the age of 18 living with them, 49.4% were married couples living together, 7.8% had a female householder with no husband present, and 40.4% were non-families. 33.8% of all households were made up of individuals, and 11.7% had someone living alone who was 65 years of age or older. The average household size was 2.20 and the average family size was 2.85.

In the town, the population was spread out, with 18.6% under the age of 18, 4.0% from 18 to 24, 28.0% from 25 to 44, 29.9% from 45 to 64, and 19.4% who were 65 years of age or older. The median age was 45 years. For every 100 females, there were 91.2 males. For every 100 females age 18 and over, there were 86.7 males.

The median income for a household in the town was $64,052, and the median income for a family was $76,926. Males had a median income of $52,045 versus $46,522 for females. The per capita income for the town was $41,807. About 1.4% of families and 2.6% of the population were below the poverty line, including 2.7% of those under age 18 and 2.0% of those age 65 or over.

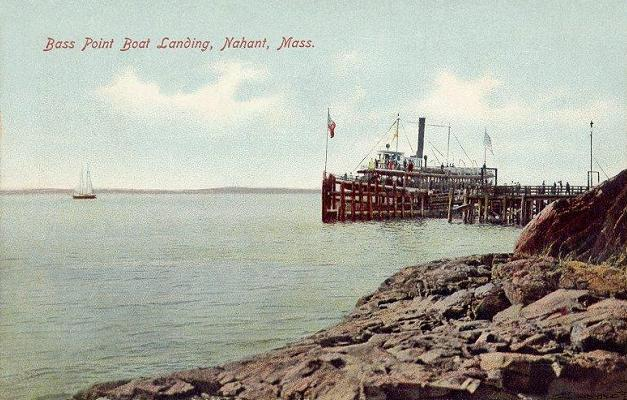
Bass Point Boat Landing in 1907

== Education ==
Students attend grades preschool through sixth at Johnson Elementary School in Nahant. For grades seven through twelve, students attend schools in nearby Swampscott. Circa 2016, there were 136 students at the Swampscott schools, including Swampscott High School.

== Arts and culture ==
- The peninsula is the subject of Lydia Sigourney's poem Nahant published in Scenes in my Native Land, 1845, together with illustrative text.
- The Henry Cabot Lodge House, a National Historic Landmark at 5 Cliff Street in Nahant
- Greenlawn Cemetery, a historic cemetery
- Nahant Historical Society Museum, located in the Nahant Community Center
- Northeastern University Marine Science Center, located at East Point, also home to Nahant's observatory. Martin Scorsese filmed the lighthouse scenes for the movie Shutter Island here in the summer of 2008.
- The World War II Bunkers. Located inside Trimountain and East Point, they were initially designed to defend Boston Harbor and the surrounding waters from a possible attack during the war. During the Cold War, the installation at East Point housed Nike missiles intended to stop a nuclear attack on Boston.

=== Annual events ===
- The annual Fourth of July fireworks
- Started in 1996, the annual Nahant Christmas Parade is one of the biggest celebrations the town of Nahant puts on.
- The Memorial Day Parade is a day of homecoming for former Nahant residents who gather each year to watch the festivities, which includes the playing of Taps at the cemetery, and cannon fire at Tudor Wharf.

== In popular culture ==
- Nahant appears in the 2015 post-apocalyptic RPG Fallout 4.
- Nahant was the basis for the fictional town of Lovecraft, Massachusetts, featured in the Eisner comic series Locke & Key by Joe Hill, son of Stephen King. Some fictional locations in the book were based on landmarks in Nahant.
- The narrator of Sarah's Key, a novel by Tatiana de Rosnay, was Miss Nahant in her youth.
- Nahant is the main setting in the novel An Ocean Full of Angels: The Autobiography of 'Isa Ben Adam by Peter Kreeft.
- Nahant, and Nahant Beach, are mentioned several times in Nathaniel Hawthorne's short story, "The Village Uncle."

== Notable people ==
- Cleveland Amory (1917–1998), author and animal rights activist
- Henry Cabot Lodge Jr. (1902–1985), politician, born in Nahant
- Barbra Fuller (1921–2024), actress, born in Nahant
- Jason Mantzoukas (born 1972), actor, born in Lynn and raised in Nahant
- Glenn Sherlock (born 1960), baseball player and coach
- Frederic Tudor (1783–1864) and family - their summer home is now the Nahant Country Club

== Image gallery ==
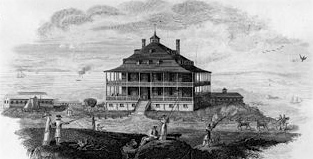
Nahant Hotel, from Boston Monthly Magazine, 1825. Engraving by J.R. Penniman

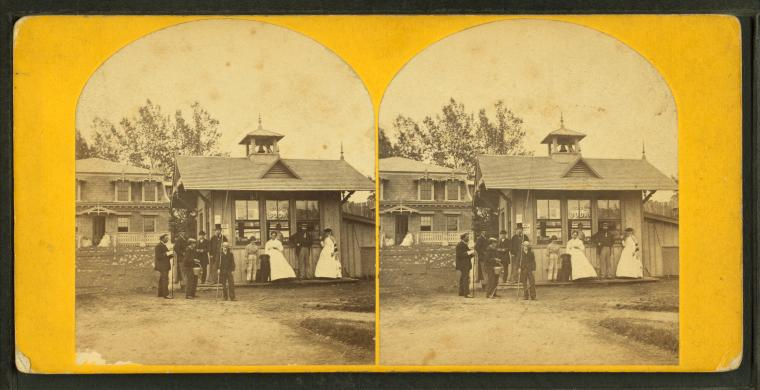
Maolis Garden, 19th century

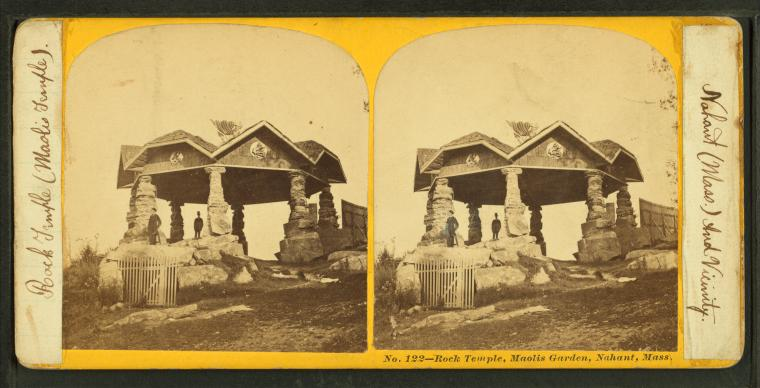
Maolis rock temple, 19th century

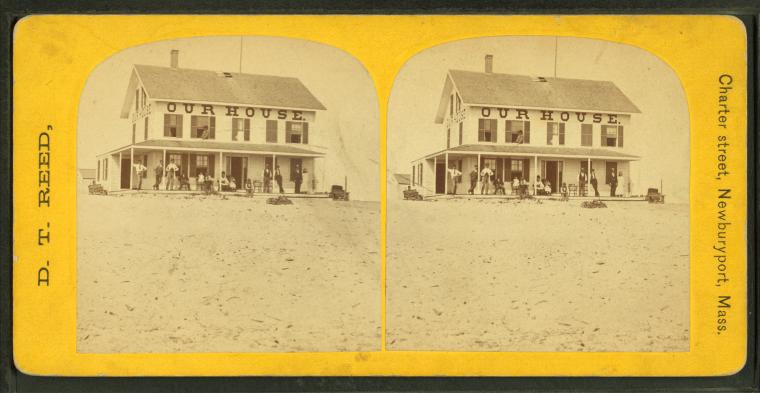
"Our House", 19th century

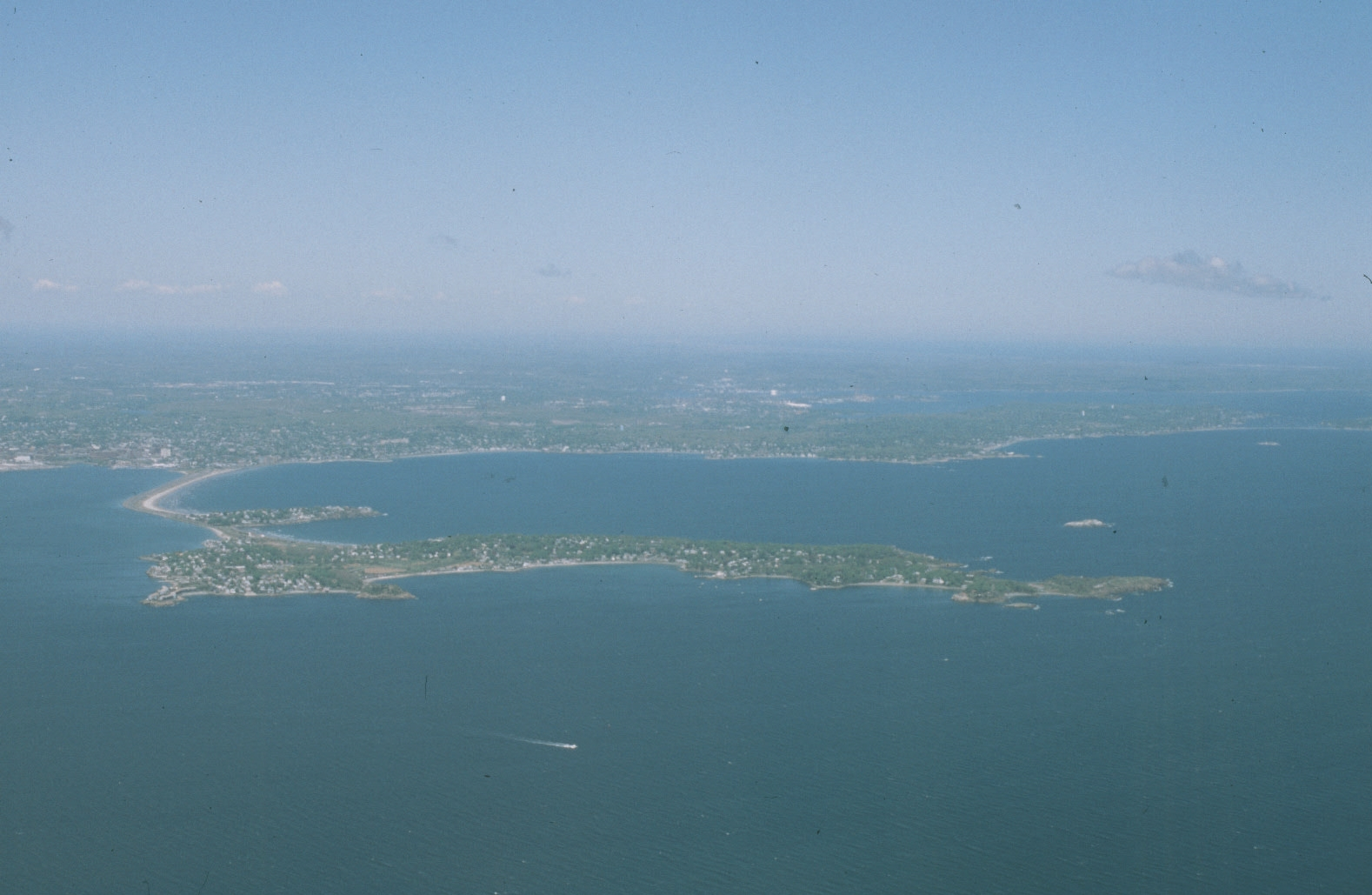
Aerial view of Nahant, as seen from an airplane

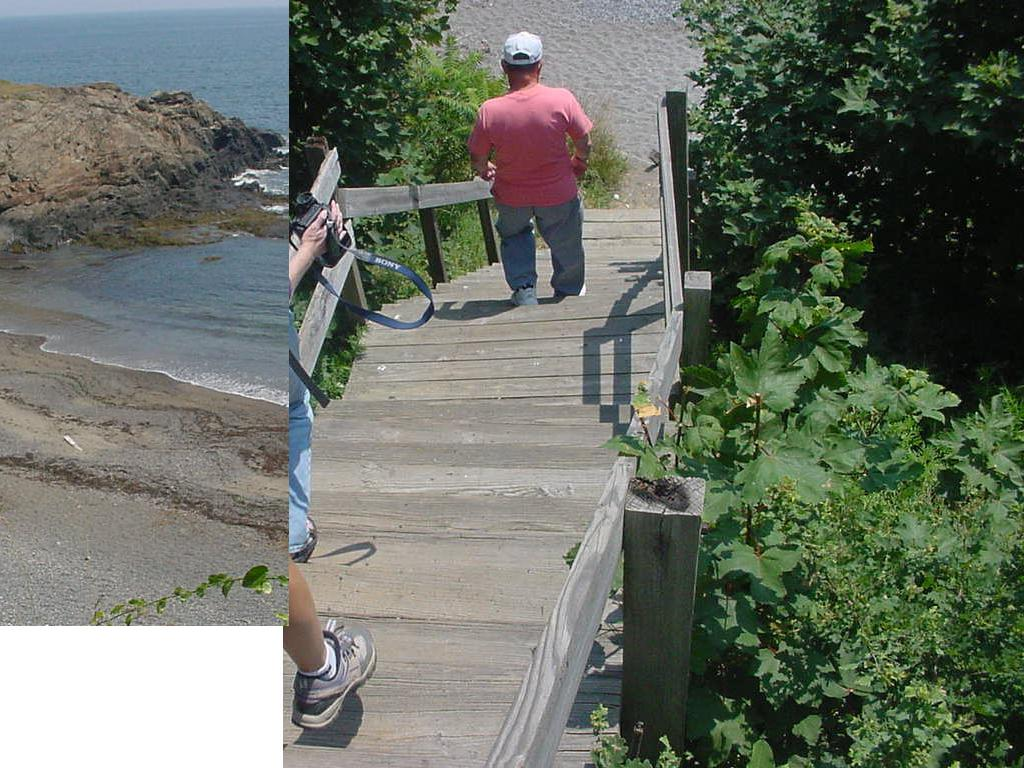
Forty Steps
