= Boston Camera Club =

Photographic club in Massachusetts, US

Coordinates: 42°20′14.59″N 71°8′32.02″W

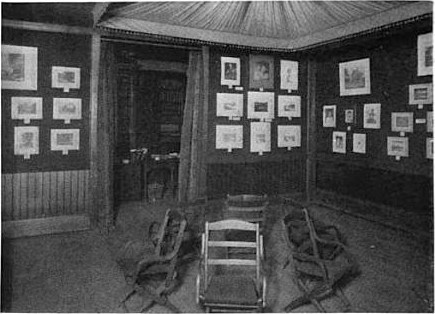
Exhibition room, Boston Camera Club, 50 Brom- field St.

The Boston Camera Club is an amateur photographic organization in Boston, Massachusetts. Founded in 1881, it offers activities of interest to amateur photographers, in both digital and film photography. Supported by member dues, its programs are open free to the public.

== History ==
Photography was introduced in 1839. For some decades it involved laborious daguerreotype followed by wet-plate and other processes. Amateur photography in the United States got its first major boost in 1880, when the future Eastman Kodak Co. and others introduced dry plates-glass plates with pre-applied chemical emulsion. In 1888 Kodak introduced flexible media-first paper and soon film-and third-party processing. These innovations brought photography to the masses. Still, professionals and advanced amateurs typically continued to use glass plates until the early 20th century, when film was universally accepted. Today most photography, including in the club, is digital.

The club known today as the Boston Camera Club was founded October 7, 1881 in Boston as the Boston Society of Amateur Photographers. It is the oldest continuously active camera club founded by amateurs, and the second-oldest active camera club, in the U.S. Present at the October 7 meeting were F. H. Blair, James M. Codman, W. C. Greenough, A. P. Howard, Lucius L. Hubbard, Frederick Ober, and John H. Thurston, with Thurston having the most active role. At first, temporary officers were elected. On November 9, 1881 in a Boston newspaper, the group solicited support from anyone else interested. Accordingly another nascent group, comprising James F. Babcock, William T. Brigham, Wilfred A. French, William A. Hovey, and others, joined them. The combined group met on November 18, 1881, and permanent officers were elected-Brigham president, Babcock vice president, and French secretary and treasurer. Babcock was a professor of chemistry; French and Thurston Boston photographic suppliers; Hovey a newspaper editor. At first the club met in various places, including the offices of Hovey's Boston Sunday Budget newspaper. Later, Massachusetts Institute of Technology (MIT), then located in Boston, became a regular meeting place. Dues were not particularly low for the time-$5 annually plus a $3 admission fee.

As amateur photography in the United States became more widespread, in 1886 the club changed its name to Boston Camera Club. The first regular (all-member) meeting of the renamed club was held October 7, 1886. On April 6, 1887, it incorporated under the new name in the Commonwealth of Massachusetts, as that state styles itself, stating as its purpose the furthering of "the knowledge of photography in all its branches and the promotion of social intercourse among the amateur photographers of Boston and vicinity." The first president (1886-1890) of the incorporated club was George Edward Cabot, an electrical products manufacturer. As of 1888, the club had 64 members. By the end of the 19th century, it was typically closer to 100. By now, dues were expensive-$20 annually.

=== 20th century ===
Starting in 1886 for some three-and-a-half decades, the Boston Camera Club rented headquarters at 50 Bromfield Street, Boston. It may have been selected by being the business address of both club founder Thurston, a photo supplier; and early vice president Charles Henry Currier, a jeweler and commercial photographer, and by being in Boston's photo-supply district. The club had eight rooms including an exhibition gallery, multi-function studio, dark rooms, enlarging room, and library. Equipment included cameras, Dallmeyer portrait lenses, enlargers, a double stereopticon lantern-slide projector, and electric arc lights, giving members the capability of making bromide and other prints, enlarged negatives, and lantern slides.

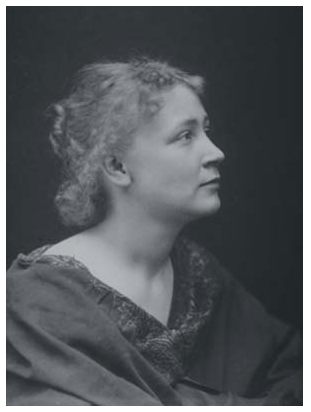
"Boston Types-Miss H" by Walter G. Chase, Boston Camera Club. Exhibited in Washington Salon and Art Photographic Exhibition, Washington DC, 1896.

For reasons begging research, by 1908 the Boston Camera Club was facing difficulties, journal Photo-Era saying it had been "long been on the sick list." Although it remained active, holding member exhibitions until at least 1912, membership declined and its future was uncertain. Business meetings continued, but apparently far fewer regular meetings. The club was kept alive by Frank Roy Fraprie (FRAYP-ree), club president Phineas Hubbard, Horace A. Latimer, and the aging Thurston. The club, it is believed in 1924, left 50 Bromfield Street and for some years met at the Boston Young Men's Christian Union (YMCU). Amateur photography in Boston now seems to have been dominated by three entities-the Boston YMCU Camera Club (a different entity than Boston Camera Club's meetings at YMCU), active from 1908 to at least the 1920s; Boston Photo-Clan, active about 1912-1921, mentored by Boston commercial photographer John H. Garo, at whose studio it met, of which Fraprie was a member as well; and The Society of Arts and Crafts, Boston.

In 1931 a bequest by club member Horace A. Latimer of Boston, a wealthy amateur photographer of some renown, reinvigorated the Boston Camera Club. The club moved temporarily to 330 Newbury Street in the Back Bay section of Boston. Although membership in 1934 was only 45, in 1936 with Latimer's bequest it purchased a building at nearby 351 Newbury Street, Back Bay, where it occupied three floors, having two exhibition galleries, darkroom, library, and kitchen. Public exhibitions resumed. For tax reasons, in 1946 the club sold no. 351 and remained in the building as a lessee. Growth continued apace. Membership rebounded and, especially with the return of service persons after World War II, reached 350 about 1949. It reached its highest known level of 547 in 1959, a trend attributable to post-war prosperity and the introduction of 35-millimeter film by Kodak in the 1930s. Throughout, enthusiasts often sought instruction in camera use by joining a camera club. Starting in the 1960s for much of the rest of the century, however, membership declined again, for example to 440 in 1970, and then much lower. Much of it was due to camera automation requiring less instruction, like single lens reflex (SLR) cameras introduced in the 1960s, autofocus and automated exposure in the 1970s, the introduction of rival hobby technologies like consumer video, and sociological factors.

Because of the owner's sale of the building, in 1980 the Boston Camera Club had to vacate its 351 Newbury Street headquarters. For the first and only time, the club left Boston, relocating to the adjacent town of Brookline, Massachusetts. In 1997 it moved across town to another part of Brookline. Starting in 2006 membership rebounded again, due in large part to the club's emphasis on digital photography, increased promotion of the club, and its website. In 2020-2022 during the worldwide coronavirus, the club held its meetings and presentations online. In 2023 the Boston Camera Club returned to Boston, and to its present headquarters and meeting place, historic Old South Church in Boston in Copley Square, in Boston's Back Bay district.

== Prominent members ==
Because the Boston Camera Club was founded before amateur photography was widespread, many early members were knowledgeable practitioners. A few even made advances in photographic technology, or received notice for their work. Since at least 1889, the Boston Camera Club has awarded honorary life membership on two classes of individuals—members giving extraordinary service to the club, and outside personalities in the Boston area for signal achievement in photography. As of 1889 there was one honorary member, Boston studio photographer Frank Rowell.

=== 19th century ===
Among the founders of the Boston Society of Amateur Photographers, as the Boston Camera Club was first known, its first vice president James F. Babcock was a Boston chemistry professor who held several U.S. patents. Wilfred A. French was publisher and editor of journal Photo-Era, and a founding member of a group called the National Historic Picture Guild. Prominent in the early club were Emma J. Fitz; Rhode Island photographer, painter, and suffragist Sarah Jane Eddy; and Maine photography pioneer Emma D. Sewall. Honorary member George Edward Cabot, first president of the incorporated club, was a partner in the aforementioned George Cabot's Holtzer-Cabot electrical products company, Boston. Another early honorary member was late-19th century lecturer Antonie Stölle, a presenter of innovative color slide-illustrated lectures on works of art. The Boston Camera Club counted two noted astronomers among its members, Percival Lowell and honorary member William Henry Pickering. Pickering, an astrophotographer who discovered Saturn's moon Phoebe, worked on faster camera shutters for nighttime work and furthered the cause of women in astronomy.

Painter, photographer, Boston art patron, and club member Sarah Choate Sears was named a Member of the Photo-Secession by Alfred Stieglitz. In 1899 she had a solo exhibition at the club that included a portrait of Julia Ward Howe. That year she also showed in the second Boston Arts and Crafts Exhibition. Two collaborators of Alexander Graham Bell were honorary club members. Prof. Charles "Charlie" Robert Cross is believed to have taught the first electrical engineering course in the U.S., at MIT in 1882-1883. Inventor and club vice president Francis Blake, Jr. is believed to have substantially helped the club financially in its early years. The 1877 Blake amplifier enabled Bell's line of telephones to become the predominant brand in the U.S. In 1886, two weeks after the club changed its name to Boston Camera Club, he read an important paper on camera shutters, in which he did pioneering work. Although his work was likely not yet perfected, Elton W. Hall says the paper "established him as an expert in high-speed photography." By 1890, he had achieved 1/2000-second exposure times, at which time he presented his full results to the club. Fred Holland Day, publisher, esthete, photography lecturer and mentor, and a leading U.S. artistic photographer of the late 19th and early 20th century, joined the Boston Camera Club in 1889. Besides lecturing at the club, he judged at least one exhibition there, in 1906. In 1896 a print by amateur Boston photographer Horace A. Latimer, the club's best-remembered early member, was shown at the Smithsonian Institution. Latimer, a yachting and international travel photographer, is the only known Boston Camera Club member published in The Camera Club of New York's Camera Notes. In gratitude to his 1931 bequest which revived the club's fortunes, the club's print critiques today are called the Horace A. Latimer Print Competition.

=== 20th & 21st centuries ===
In the first half of the 20th century, three Boston Camera Club members were photographic authors and publishers. Wilfred A. French was mentioned. The prolific Frank Roy Fraprie headed American Photographic Publishing Co. and edited annuals American Amateur Photographer and American Annual of Photography. Honorary member Franklin Ingalls "Pop" Jordan was a photographic author and editor. Another personality, Adolf "Papa" Fassbender, the German-born New York City educator called a "one-man photographic institution," had a career of 72 years training thousands in photography. In 1903 club member Wendell G. Corthell was a co-founder of the Salon Club of America, an artistic photographic group in opposition to Stieglitz's Photo-Secession. Another noted photographer was Lillian Baynes Griffin, who joined the club in 1906.

The Boston Camera Club had members who were non-photographic artists of note practicing photography secondarily. They include Gloucester (Massachusetts) Fisherman's Memorial sculptor Leonard Craske (KRASK); prolific Cape Ann, Massachusetts etcher, photographer, and author Samuel V. Chamberlain, who wrote at least 45 photo-illustrated travel books; painter Emil Albert Grupp‚; and post-Secessionist photographer and watercolorist Eleanor Parke Custis. Photographic author and publisher Arthur Hammond won top prize at the 1939 New York World's Fair for his photo of the fair's icons, the Trylon and Perisphere. Architect and author, club president L. Whitney "Whit" Standish, helped organize the club's weekly meetings, competitions, educational courses, and newsletter. Noted etcher Arthur William Heintzelman was first keeper of prints of Boston Public Library. Chamberlain, Hammond, Standish, and Heintzelman were honorary members.

One of the most well known photographic inventors of the 20th century, National Medal of Science (1973) recipient, MIT professor, and Boston Camera Club honorary member Harold E. "Doc" Edgerton greatly advanced the photographic strobe by achieving exposure times of one-millionth of a second, and had well-known stop-action photographs in Life magazine. Lesser known are his night aerial strobe work for the Allied D-Day invasion in World War II, his co-founding of defense contractor EG&G, and undersea explorations with Jacques Cousteau.

In the second half of the 20th century, the club had members with noted photographic achievements. H. Bradford Washburn, Jr. was a noted mountaineer, cartographer, aerial photographer, and longtime first director of the Boston Museum of Science. Photojournalist Arthur Griffin was the best-known photographer of New England scenes in the mid-20th century, and in 1992 opened his Boston-area Griffin Museum of Photography. Club president Henry F. Weisenburger, a photographer since the 1940s who joined the club in 1954, was perhaps the longest-active exponent of amateur photography in New England. Leslie A. Campbell, a locally noted promoter of amateur photography in western Massachusetts, in 1959 founded Massachusetts Camera Naturalists, a nature photography group. Lou Jones is a Boston-based commercial, Olympic Games, and jazz photographer, a photojournalist whose books include Final Exposure: Portraits from Death Row (1996), and photography educator. Boston news photographer and camera salesman Gordon A. Hicks is the longest-known club member at 71 years, 1938-2009. All were honorary members.

== Exhibitions ==
The exhibition history of the Boston Camera Club is long and somewhat complex. The club has hosted several species of shows. There have been exhibitions by its members, at the club and elsewhere in Boston; joint shows with other camera clubs; exhibitions by outside photographers; and salons-judged competitive exhibitions of photography open to the international public.

About the Boston Society of Amateur Photographers, as the club was first known, Sarah Greenough says its first shows "established many of the patterns and issues that would dominate future exhibitions" of photo clubs and societies in the U.S. In 1883 at MIT, the club held its first exhibition, an unusually large show of some 700 prints. The second exhibition in 1884 was held at the Boston Art Club. The third, in 1885, included male nudes, raising eyebrows in conservative Boston. In 1892 the club exhibited in the long-running triennial exhibition of the Massachusetts Charitable Mechanic Association. In 1893, judges in the club's annual exhibition included American painter Edmund C. Tarbell, and Boston photo studio owner and club honorary member, the aforementioned Frank Rowell. In the club's 7th and 10th member exhibitions in 1895 and 1898, member Emma D. Sewall won the top award. Prominent also in the 1898 show were club members Sarah Jane Eddy and Boston personality Sarah Choate Sears.

In 1898 the Boston Camera Club exhibited 250 prints by Fred Holland Day. About 1904 it exhibited members' work at Day's studio in Boston. In 1904 it helped organize, and exhibited in, a photograph exhibition at the Louisiana Purchase Exposition, the St. Louis World's Fair. In 1907 the club showed the work of Wendell G. Corthell. The club's annual show of 1910, which Photo-Era called the club's "best for many years," had prints by Eddy, Frank R. Fraprie, Horace A. Latimer, and Joseph Prince Loud.

Concurrently, Joint Exhibitions of Photography were held, sponsored by the Boston Camera Club, Photographic Society of Philadelphia, and Society of Amateur Photographers of New York, with the venue rotating annually among the three cities. There were seven exhibitions, in 1887-1889 and 1891-1894. At first, the three clubs shared in the preparation for each show. In the first Joint Exhibition, held in New York City in 1887, Joseph P. Loud and Horace A. Latimer received the Boston club's only diplomas. In the third exhibition in Philadelphia in 1889, Boston was represented by Wilfred A. French, Latimer, and William Garrison Reed. Starting with the fourth exhibition in New York City in 1891, collaborative preparation ended and each club individually ran the exhibition in the city in which it was held. That year Latimer exhibited the most prints from the Boston club. The fifth Joint Exhibition, held at the Boston Art Club in 1892, was a large show of over 600 objects, including 18 prints by Alfred Stieglitz, and 45 prints by the Boston club's Francis Blake Jr., the first public showing of his work. Of the sixth exhibition in Philadelphia in 1893, Stieglitz called it "without doubt, the finest exhibition of photographs ever held in the United States, and probably was but once excelled in any country."

=== Salons ===
The Boston Camera Club has had two series of photographic salons, or competitive exhibitions. The first series was held in the first decade of the 20th century, probably for only a few years. Presently only the second salon, held in 1906, has been identified. After its revival by Horace Latimer's 1931 bequest, in 1932 the club launched an international competition, the Boston Salon of Photography, held 43 times over the next five decades. In 1953 it was renamed the Boston International Exhibition of Photography, although informally often still called the "Boston salon." In 1953 as well, the Frank R. Fraprie Memorial Medal was created in recognition of Fraprie's role, along with Latimer, in having kept the club alive in the difficult years of 1913-1931. At first the salon was limited to black-and-white prints. Starting in 1954 color slides (transparencies) were admitted. In 1959 a color print section was added. The 43rd and last exhibition was held in 1981, the club's centenary year. In discontinuing the international exhibitions, the club cited lack of manpower. Whereas earlier salons typically received hundreds of entries each, the 1981 exhibition took a man-year of labor to process over 3,200 prints and slides.

Entrants of note in the Boston Salon and International Exhibition over the years include Croatian photographer Toso Dabac, the 1937 medal winner. Competing by the 9th Salon in 1940 were Eleanor Parke Custis, and amateur photographer and future U.S. senator and presidential candidate Barry Goldwater. Noted pictorialist and longtime Baltimore Sun photographer A. Aubrey Bodine, competing by 1944, received the first Fraprie medal in 1953, winning it again in 1955 and 1959. Competing in this era too was 1940s pictorialist Rowena Fruth. There was also longtime competitor Wellington Lee, who competed from 1950 to the last salon in 1981; Hong Kong-American photo prodigy, actor, and director Fan Ho, who first competed in 1954 at age 17; and Mexican cinema director Jos‚ Lorenzo Zakany Almada, who won the Boston Camera Club Medal in 1968. In 2021 the club mounted an outdoor exhibition, showing its members' work on a wall in Boston's Seaport district, in collaboration with community organizations.

=== Guest exhibitors ===
From the late 19th to at least the mid-20th century the Boston Camera Club had exhibitions by prominent outside photographers. In 1896 it showed work by Alfred Stieglitz. In 1899 it had shows by major figures Frances Benjamin Johnston and Clarence White, the latter organized and hung by Fred Holland Day. In 1900 it showed 150 photos by Gertrude Käsebier. Photo-Era called it "undoubtedly the finest collection of photographs ever seen" in Boston. The same year, Boston professional photographer Frank W. Birchall showed some photos at the club. Also in this era, the club exhibited the work of early English pioneer photographer Henry Peach Robinson, German photographer Rudolph Dührkoop, and lesser-known photographers. In 1907 there was an exhibition by physiologist and educator Frederick Haven Pratt, a friend of Fred Holland Day and Member of the Photo-Secession.

From the late 19th to early 20th century U.S. camera clubs mounted exhibitions of each other's work. In 1908 the Boston club showed the work of two organizations in Buffalo, New York, and by the Capitol (Washington, D.C.) and Portland (Maine) Camera Clubs; and in 1909 the Philadelphia Photographic Society. In 1940 it exhibited the work of Edward Weston, and in 1950 Paul Gittings, Sr. During the Boston Symphony Orchestra's 1950–1951 season it had an exhibition in Boston's Symphony Hall. In 1953 the club exhibited the 1840s work of Scottish pioneers David Octavius Hill and Robert Adamson (Hill and Adamson).

== Education & other activities ==
In discharging the mandate of its 1887 state charter to promulgate the "knowledge of photography," the Boston Camera Club has sponsored lectures and programs by expert members and guests. Writing in 1893, club member Benjamin Kimball said Boston camera manufacturer Thomas H. Blair gave the club's first known talk, on lenses; the year is unstated. The first documented lecture is a paper on the history of photography read to the club on February 5, 1883 by then-president William T. Brigham. In 1886 and 1890 club member Francis Blake Jr. made presentations on high-speed photography. In 1895 member Owen A. Eames presented his Eames Animatoscope, an early motion picture device. In 1897 Friedrich von Voigtländer, head of the Austrian optical firm of that surname, spoke to the club. In 1904, likely at his studio during the club's aforementioned show there, Fred Holland Day presented a paper for which he was well known, "Is Photography a Fine Art?" Many others lectured at the club in its early years.

About 1888 William Garrison Reed and other Boston Camera Club members undertook the Old Boston project, a photo survey of sites around Boston whose photographs, owned by the Boston Public Library, were rediscovered in 2007. During the 1890s members of the club made lantern slides, the forerunner of 20th-century color slides; and pursued stereo, or 3-D, photography. In the 1940s the club brought entertainment and instruction to disabled World War II veterans at a Boston-area Army hospital. In the 1950s and 1960s the club had a movie group and owned a movie projector. In the 1970s and 1980s the club had presentations by Marie Cosindas and Minor White. In the 1990s it sponsored day-long courses by Lou Jones, Frans Lanting, John Sexton, and others. Boston-area professionals including staff photographers of the Boston Globe and Boston Herald, and instructors in Boston's New England School of Photography and other institutions, have been club presenters and competition judges. Since the latter 1990s the Boston Camera Club has regularly held lectures and field trips in digital photography.

== Today ==
As it has for most of its existence, the Boston Camera Club meets weekly. Meetings are held weekly, except in summer, at its Old South Church in Boston headquarters. Meetings are open and free to the public. Activities range from beginner to advanced and comprise education, print competitions and critique, live-model formal portrait sessions, field trips, and inter-club competitions. Outside speakers and competition judges are regularly invited. The club communicates through its website and newsletter, The Reflector, launched in 1938 and published electronically. The Boston Camera Club is a member of New England Camera Club Council and Photographic Society of America.

== Image gallery ==
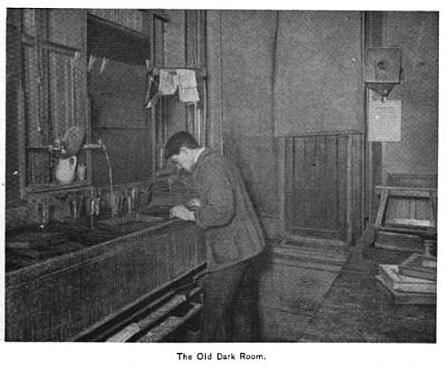
Darkroom

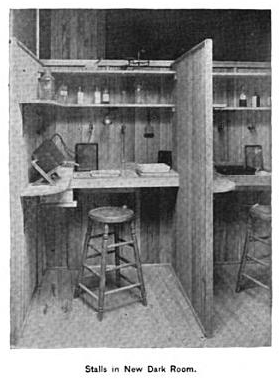
Darkroom stalls

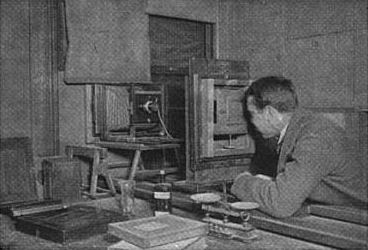
Making lantern slides

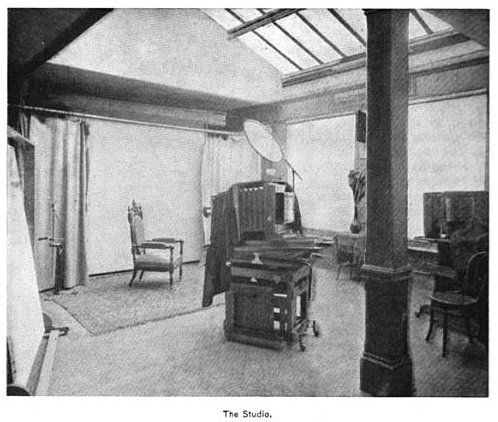
Studio, with skylight

All images, 50 Bromfield Street, Boston, 1893.

== Sources & further reading ==
=== Club ===
Chronologically:
Boston Camera Club records. 10 vols., 1881-1971. Holder: Boston Athenaeum, Boston MA. Listing.
Boston Club Book for 1888, The. Boston: Edwin F. Clark, 62; 1889, 45-46. First known published lists of club members. Curiosities, 1889: Member George Snell: the noted Boston architect? John H. Thurston omitted; error?
Clark's Boston Blue Book. 1878-1937. BCC listings in 1895-1903; perhaps more.
"New Dark Room for Boston Camera Club." Boston Daily Globe, Oct. 7, 1890, 4.
"Caught from the Sun: Marvellous Work in Photography by the Members of Boston Camera Club at Their Exhibition." Boston Daily Globe, Jan. 7, 1892, 10.
Kimball, Benjamin. "Boston Camera Club, The." New England Magazine, Apr. 1893, 185-205. HT.
"Studies in Classic Poses: Strong Exhibition of Photos Made at Boston Camera Club... ." Boston Daily Globe, Mar. 9, 1898, 7.
Year Book, The. 1900. Smithsonian Institution Archives of American Art. Microfilm reel 4858, frames 517-525. Officers, members, club rules, diagram of club rooms.
Swift, W. B. "New England Camera Clubs." Photographic Times. Feb. 1901, 60-61. HT.
"Friends Played Joke: Got at Chief Petty Officer Jackson's Slides and Created Fun for Boston Camera Club." Boston Daily Globe, Apr. 9, 1909, 6.
French, Wilfred A. "Pictorial Attractions of Boston, The." Photo-Era, Aug. 1910, 64-71, 94-95, HT.
----. "Exposure Guides and Experience." Photo-Era, May 1920, 232-233, 262. HT. Anecdote about an encounter in downtown Boston on a club outing in the 1880s with prominent Boston photographer James Wallace Black.
Standish, L. Whitney. "Those Improper Bostonians." American Photography, Dec. 1949, pg. nos. beg inquiry. History of BCC in 1930's and 1940's.
Hillyer, Whit. "Six Prints from Boston: Progressive Schedules Crowded with Events at the Back Bay Clubhouse Add to the Impressive Record of Club's 65-Year History." Popular Photography, Mar. 1946, 40-41, 154. Includes photos by club members Harold Elliot, Frank R. Fraprie, Arthur Hammond, H. B. Hills, Franklin I. Jordan, and Barbara Standish.
Cleveland, Elizabeth F.; Daniel D. R. Charbonnet. "Boston Camera Club Centennial." ("Honoring Camera Clubs," n.14.) Photographic Society of American Journal (PSA Journal), Oct. 1981, 32.

=== Persons ===
Blake, Francis
- Davis, Keith F. "The High-Speed Photographs of Francis Blake." Mass. Historical Review, v2, 2000, 1-26.
- Hall, Elton W. Francis Blake: An Inventor's Life, 1850-1913. Mass. Historical Society, 2003, chap. 9, 142-166.
- Massachusetts Historical Society. Francis Blake papers, v42.
Day, Fred Holland
- Crump, James. F. Holland Day: Suffering the Ideal. Santa Fe, NM, 1995.
- Fairbrother, Trevor. Making a Presence: F. Holland Day in Artistic Photography. Andover MA: Addison Gallery of American Art, 2012.
- Fanning, Patricia J. Through an Uncommon Lens: The Life & Photography of F. Holland Day. Univ. Mass., 2008.
- Jussim, Estelle. Slave to Beauty: The Eccentric Life and Controversial Career of F. Holland Day, Photographer, Publisher, Aesthete. Boston, 1981.
Edgerton, Harold E.
- Bruce, Roger R., ed. Seeing the Unseen: Dr. Harold E. Edgerton and the Wonders of Strobe Alley. Exhib. catalog. Geo. Eastman House; MIT. 1994.
- Engineering and Technology History Wiki.
Latimer, Horace A.
- Boston Globe. "Horace A. Latimer, A Man of Mystery: Recluse Millionaire Was Expert Photographer." Sep. 19, 1931, 16. Obituary.
- William F. Robinson, A Certain Slant of Light: One Hundred Years of New England Photography, New York Graphic Society, 1980, 143, 144, 228.
Sewall, Emma D.
- Sewall, Abbie. Message through Time: The Photographs of Emma D. Sewall, 1836-1919. Gardiner ME, 1989.
Washburn, H. Bradford Jr.
- New York Times. "Copters and Lasers Map Grand Canyon." Jul. 19, 1972.
- Rowan, Roy. "On a Bungled Flight to Nowhere, They Sought a Chinese Mountain High: When a Ballpoint Pen Czar and a Hotshot Pilot Went Looking for the World's Tallest Peak, All They Found Was Trouble." Smithsonian, Mar. 1998.
- Wroth, Katharine. "High Art: The Astonishing Life & Work of Brad Washburn." Appalachian Mountain Club Outdoors (AMC Outdoors). Mar. 2004, 26-33.
Other
- Jordan, Franklin I. "Pop Sez -." American Photography, Mar. 1950, 28.
- Peterson, Christian. Pictorial Photography at the Minneapolis Institute of Art. The institute, 2012.

=== Photo history ===
Brigham, William T. "The Dawn of Photography: A Paper Read at the Annual Meeting of the Boston Society of Amateur Photographers, February 5, 1883." Boston, 1883, HT.
Greenough, Sarah. "The Economic Incentives, Social Inducements, and Aesthetic Issues of American Pictorial Photography, 1888–1902." In: Martha A. Sandweiss, ed. Photography in 19th-Century America, Amon Carter Museum (Ft. Worth, TX), Abrams, 1991.
Polito, Ronald, ed. (Chris Steele & Polito, compilers). A Directory of Massachusetts Photographers, 1839-1900, Camden, Maine: 1993.
Robinson, William F. A Certain Slant of Light: The First 100 Years of New England Photography, New York Graphic Society, 1980.

== Life dates of selected persons mentioned ==
- Cecil B. Atwater, 1886-1981.
- James F. Babcock, 1844-1897.
- Frank W. Birchall, 1857-1916.
- Francis Blake Jr., 1850-1913.
- Aldine Aubrey Bodine, 1906-1970.
- Roydon Burke, 1901-1993.
- George Edward Cabot, 1861-1946.
- Leslie A. Campbell, 1925-2020.
- Samuel Vance Chamberlain, 1895-1975.
- Daniel D. R. Charbonnet, 1943-2020.
- Wendell G(urney?) Corthell, 1844?-1915.
- Marie Cosindas, 1923-2017.
- Leonard Craske, 1882-1950.
- Charles Robert Cross, 1848-1921.
- Charles Henry Currier, 1851-1938.
- Eleanor Parke Custis, 1897-1983.
- Fred (his birth name) Holland Day, 1864-1933.
- John W. Doscher, d. after 1971.
- Rudolph Dührkoop, 1848-1918.
- Sarah Jane Eddy, 1851-1945.
- Harold Eugene Edgerton, 1903-1990.
- Adolf Fassbender, 1884-1980.
- Frank Roy Fraprie, 1874-1951.
- Wilfred A. French, 1855-1928.
- Rowena Fruth, 1896-1983.
- Barry Goldwater, 1909-1998.
- Arthur Leo Griffin, 1903-2001.
- Lillian Baynes Griffin, 1871-1916.
- Emil Albert Grupp‚, 1896-1978.
- Arthur Hammond, 1880-1962.
- Arthur William Heintzelman, 1891-1965.
- Gordon Adna Hicks, 1909-2009.
- Fan Ho, 1937-2016.
- Frances Benjamin Johnston, 1864-1952.
- Lou Jones, 1945-.
- Franklin Ingalls Jordan, 1876-1956.
- Gertrude Käsebier, 1852-1934.
- Horace A(lbert?) Latimer, 1860-1931.
- Percival Lowell, 1855-1916.
- Charles B. Phelps Jr., 1891-1949.
- William Henry Pickering, 1858-1938.
- Frederick Alcott Pratt, 1863-1910.
- Frederick Haven Pratt, 1873-1958.
- Henry Peach Robinson, 1830-1901.
- David F. Rodd, 1948-2017.
- Frank Rowell, 1832-1900.
- Sarah Carlisle Choate Sears, 1858-1935.
- Emma D. Sewall, 1836-1919.
- L. Whitney Standish, 1919-?.
- Alfred Stieglitz, 1864-1946.
- Allen G. Stimson, ?-1996.
- John H. Vondell, ?-c.1967.
- Henry Bradford Washburn Jr., 1910-2007.
- Edward Weston, 1886-1958.
- Henry F. Weisenburger, 1924-2021.
- Clarence White, 1871-1925.
- Edmund A. Woodle, 1918-2007.

== See also ==
- Photography
- History of photography
- History of Boston

== Notes ==
For authors named by surname only, see sources, below. BCC denotes Boston Camera Club. GB, HT, IA denote Google Books, HathiTrust, Internet Archive.
