= Braut =

Braut is a surname. Notable people with the surname include:

- Arne Braut (born 1950), Norwegian politician
- Daniel Braut (born 2005), Norwegian footballer
- Frigga Braut (1889–1975), German actress
- Ivar Braut (born 1956), Norwegian theologian and Lutheran bishop
- Marija Braut (1929–2015), Croatian photographer
- Erling Braut Haaland (born 2000), Norwegian footballer
