= Camera Club =

A camera club is a photography organization. It may refer to:

- A specific club such as:
  - Ashiya Camera Club
  - Boston Camera Club
  - The Camera Club of New York
  - Seattle Camera Club
  - Toronto Camera Club
- The Camera Club, an English new wave band
  - Bruce Woolley and the Camera Club, the North American name of the band's album English Garden
