= Standee =

Cutout display used for advertising purposes

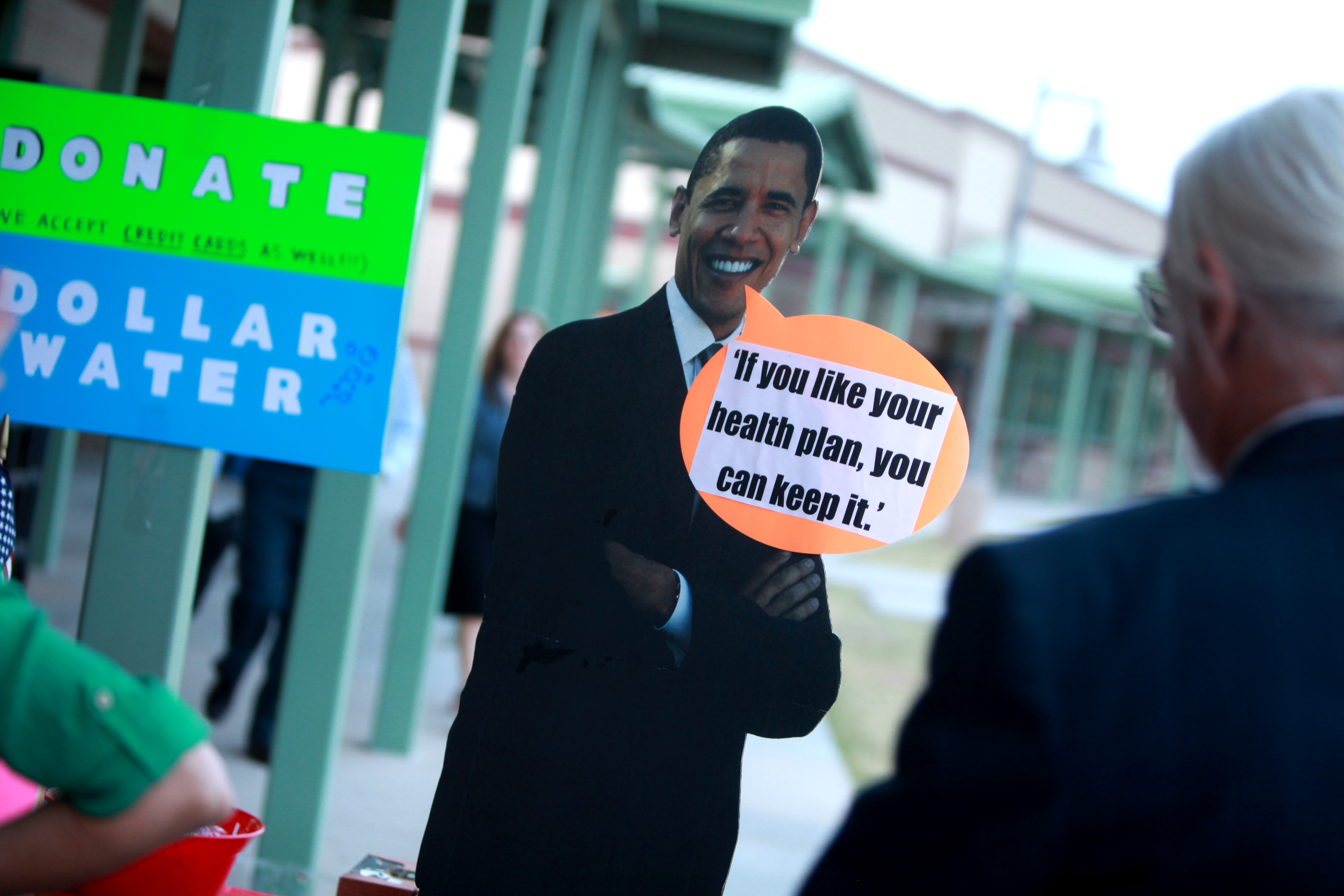
Standee of Barack Obama with a speech bubble

A standee is a large self-standing display promoting a movie, product or event, or point-of-sale advertising, often in the form of a life-size cut-out figure. They are typically made of foam-board, and may range from large self-standing posters to elaborate three-dimensional display devices with moving parts and lights.

Standees are typically displayed in theater lobbies or music stores in advance of film or music releases.

In the movie business, the more bookings a theater makes in advance for a given film, the more likely it is to place standees in its lobby because of self-interest to spur consumer interest in its future screen offerings. Standees are also called lobby stands in the film industry. In recent years, theaters increasingly look to on-site advertising from non-movie companies as a revenue source, which creates occasional friction with film distributors; when standees for Paramount's Lara Croft Tomb Raider: The Cradle of Life incorporated a promotion for the 2003 movie's tie-in promotion with Jeep automobiles, large theater circuit Regal Cinemas sought payments from Jeep for the exposure in its theaters. Paramount reportedly shifted bookings from 47 Regal theaters to other cinemas that erected the Tomb Raider/Jeep standees without payments from Jeep.

While standees have previously been available only in large quantities, recent advances in digital photography and print-on-demand technology have made them widely available to the public. Several companies now offer these items as party decorations, gag gifts and memorial items for the deceased. Standees can now be purchased as one-off custom products, bringing them to the average consumer as well as large corporations and venues.

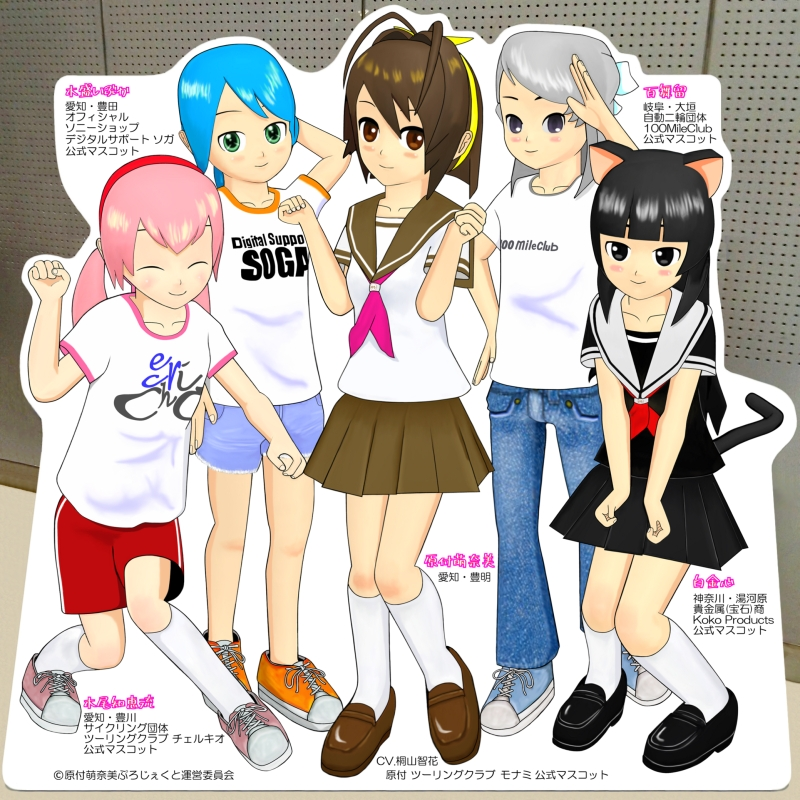
Standee of fictional characters

== History ==
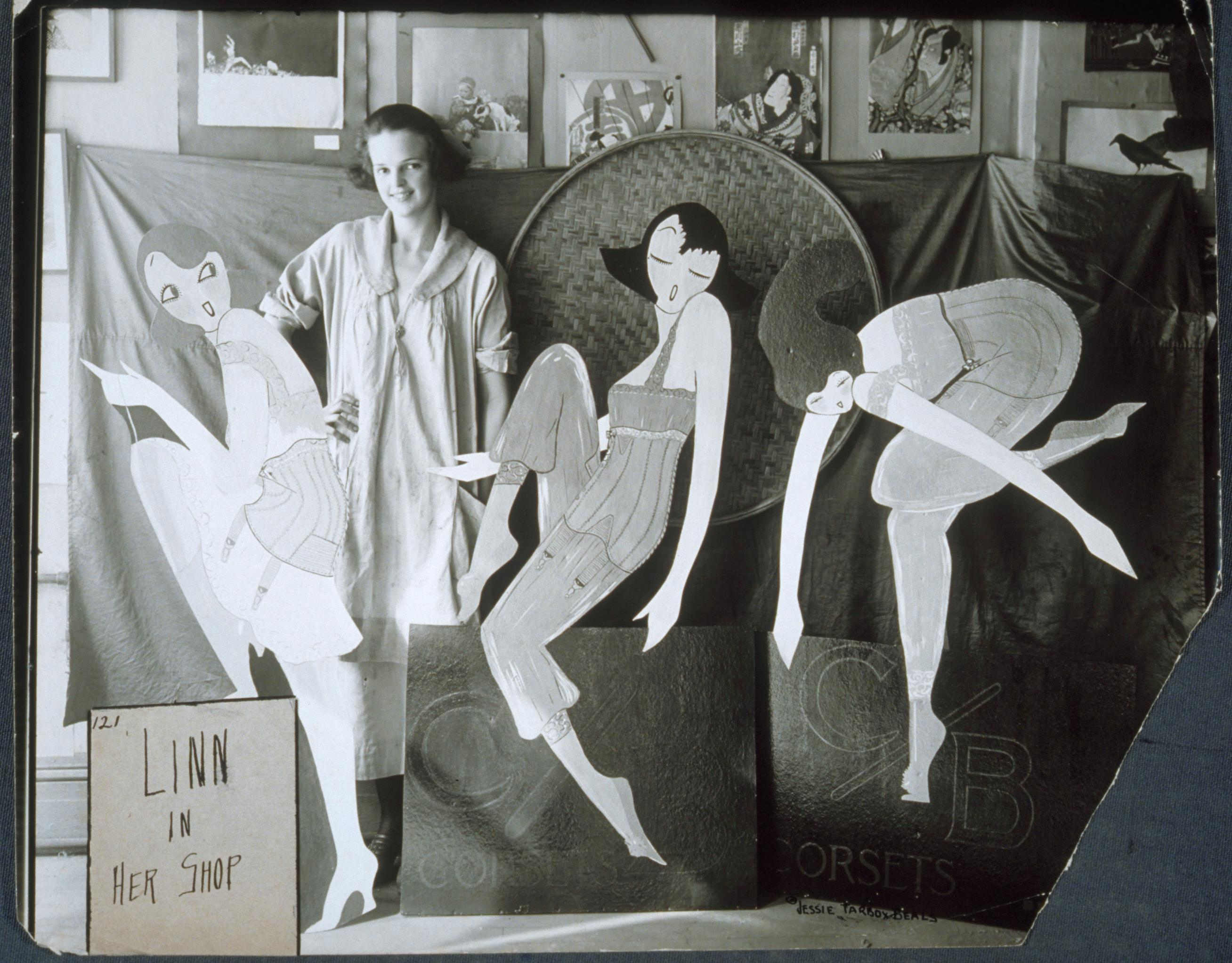
Jessie Tarbox Beals (c. 1917-1925) Merchant standing behind advertising display standee figurines

While mannequins have been used in advertising for fashion, the capacity to cheaply print large-sized images, especially in colour, has provided an eye-catching alternative for the advertising of other products. The production of such figurines evidently stretches from early in the 20th century; they appear in a photograph dating from 1917 to 1925 by Jessie Tarbox Beals (see right), and others including a Santa Claus, appear lining the walls in Walker Evans' 1936 documentary image Coal Miner's House, Scott's Run, West Virginia. The term "standee" has been in use at least since 1933, when it appeared in the Motion Picture Herald.

Especially well-known and effective internationally was the series of figurines created for a 1947 L'Oréal campaign by French advertising photographer Lucien Lorelle for which the model known only as 'Suzy B', became "Miss Ambre Solaire"; a life-size cut-out of her bikini-clad and tanned body stood at the entrance of the shops and pharmacies of French seaside resorts until the end of the 50s to advertise L'Oréal's sun tan lotion formulated in 1935.

=== Sports ===
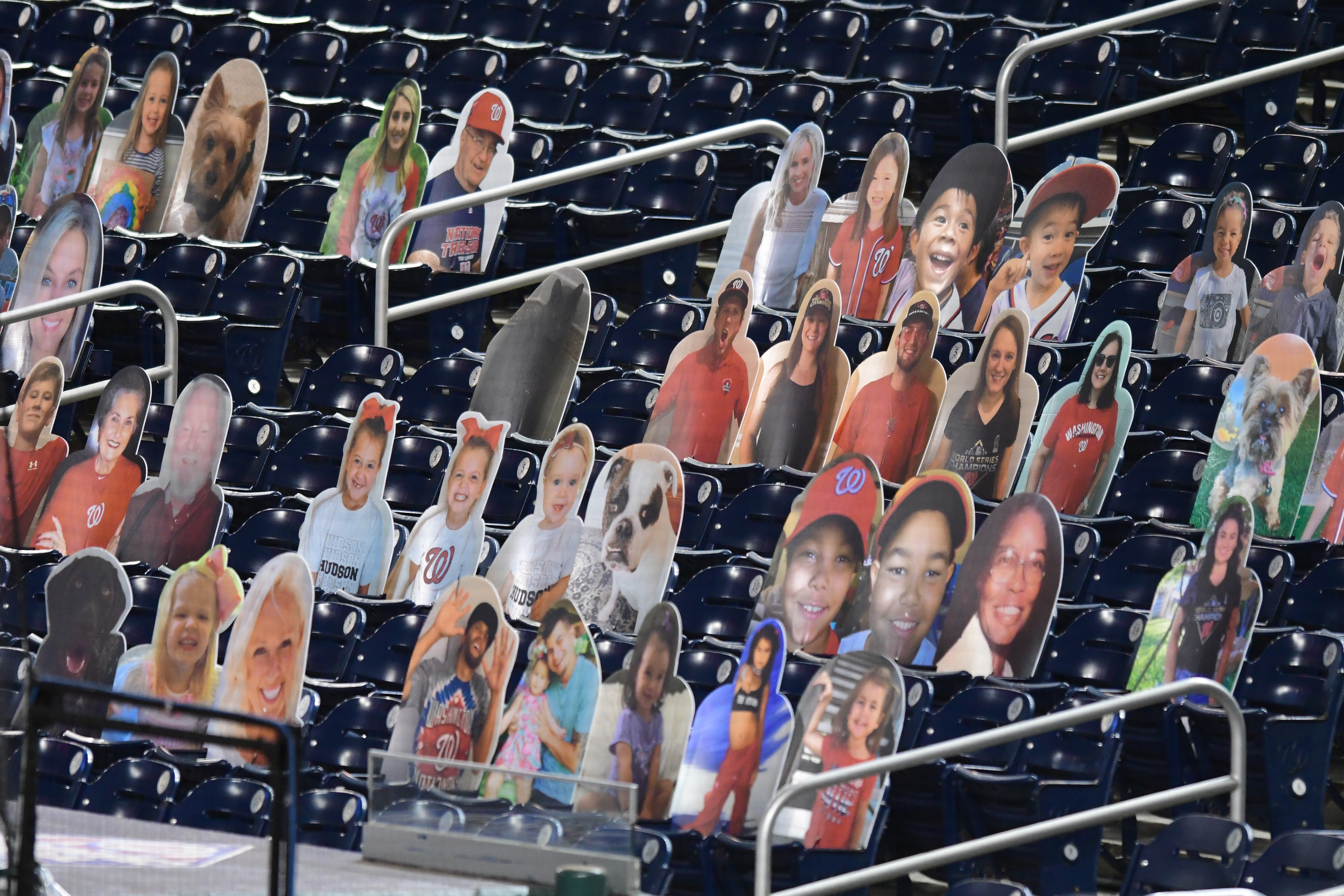
Nationals Park during a baseball game in 2020 with standees occupying seats not filled due to the COVID-19 pandemic

In 2020 and 2021 due to the COVID-19 pandemic, some venues employed standees to fill seats at sporting events being conducted at reduced or no public attendance due to public health restrictions, often featuring images of fans (who could submit their photos to appear on standees in exchange for a charitable donation), team alumni and figures, or celebrities.

Two NFL teams notably used standees of fictional characters, such as the Denver Broncos filling a portion of the stands with South Park characters as a promotion for the series (which was created by Colorado natives Trey Parker and Matt Stone, and set in a fictitious Colorado town), and the Detroit Lions using standees of Animal Crossing characters during one game (as a follow-up to an Animal Crossing: New Horizons-themed video it used to unveil their 2020 schedule).

Standees have occasionally been used to combat non-health related attendance issues. In 2010, Italian Serie B team Trieste was criticized for using cardboard cutouts to conceal large swathes of empty seats at its home venue, although in practice the fan silhouettes were printed on large vinyl banners rather than individually cut from cardboard. In 2014, the supporters' club for J-League side Omiya Ardija dressed cardboard cutouts in their team's colors when too few of their real fans could commit to an away trip.

=== Films ===
Cardboard cutouts have been used in film to simulate or enhance crowds of extras, particularly in sports-themed productions which often require large venues to appear full.

Among notable features that used such a device were baseball films The Natural and The Fan, the hockey-themed thriller Sudden Death, the American football drama Any Given Sunday, or the boxing biopic Ali. The long-running HBO series Arliss, whose title character was a sports agent, also used cardboard cutouts for many of its stadium scenes.

Prop makers later developed inflatable anthropomorphic figures to better convey volume at different angles. They made their first recorded appearance in Seabiscuit, a horse racing film released in 2003. CGI crowds have also become more prevalent.
