= Lillian Baynes Griffin =

British-born American journalist and photographer

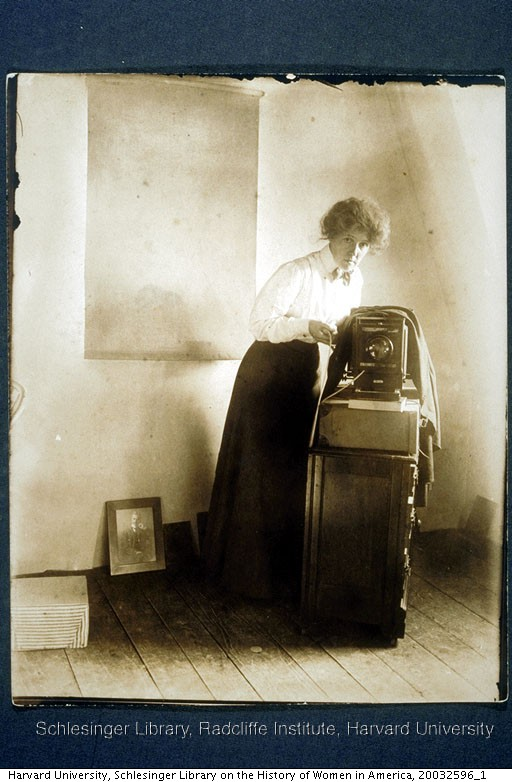
- Lillian Baynes Griffin, by Jessie Tarbox Beals
- Born: Lillian Baynes; 1871
- Died: 1916 (aged 44–45)
- Known for: Photography
- Spouse: Walter Griffin (m. 1899–1908)

Lillian Baynes Griffin (1871–1916) was a British-born American journalist and photographer who contributed to publications including The New York Times and Vanity Fair. Her article topics ranged from medical treatments and art criticism to gardening, needlework and Rose Pastor Stokes, and among her portrait subjects were Grover Cleveland’s family, John Jacob Astor VI, Winslow Homer and European royalty. She was the sister of the naturalist Ernest Harold Baynes (1868–1925) and the wife of the artist Walter Griffin (1861–1935).

== Biography ==
Lillian Baynes was the only daughter of John Baynes (1842–1903), a British inventor, and Helen Augusta Nowill Baynes (1850–1909). In the 1870s, after John had failed at running a textiles company in Calcutta, the family moved to New York. John set up the Baynes Tracery and Mosaic Co., which produced etched memorial tablets, among other products. (He patented manufacturing processes with the tastemaker Lockwood de Forest, and Baynes tablets survive at Grace Church in Newark, the Battell Chapel and Norfolk Library in Norfolk, Conn., and the Cleveland Soldiers’ and Sailors’ Monument.) Lillian trained at the New York Institute for Artist Artisans at 140 West 23rd Street (around 1893) and, in summer 1894, at the Shinnecock Hills Summer School of Art in Southampton on Long Island run by William Merritt Chase. Her brothers, the naturalist Ernest Harold Baynes and the metal etcher and photographer John R. Baynes, briefly worked for their father, who claimed (without proof) to have invented “photo-modeling,” a technique for using light to carve sculpture.

In 1899, Lillian married the painter Walter Griffin; by then she had written about topics including art classes taught by William Merritt Chase and advancements in care for premature infants. The Griffins spent a few summers in Quebec City, running Walter's Summer Painting School. They mostly lived in Hartford, Conn., where Walter taught art, and they worked for the short-lived Farmington Magazine.

In 1906, Lillian took up photography—given what she called “little opportunity for a woman to study photography professionally,” she learned techniques from other photographers. By 1908 she was estranged from Walter, who had stopped supporting her. She set up a studio in Manhattan at 39 West 67th Street, specializing in portraiture, and she joined the Hartford Camera Club, the Boston Camera Club, the Camera Club of New York and Britain's Royal Photographic Society. She traveled widely on assignment until shortly before her death.

== Achievements ==
Lillian wrote features for publications including The Art Amateur, The Delineator, Frank Leslie’s Weekly, Harper’s Bazar, the Hartford Courant, The Illustrated American, Ladies' Home Journal and the Los Angeles Times. Her photos appeared alongside some of her stories and were also published in Harper’s Weekly, New York Press, New York Times, New-York Tribune, Town & Country, Vanity Fair, Vogue and photography trade magazines. She exhibited at photo shows in Budapest, Dresden, Manhattan, Rochester, Boston, Hartford, Pittsburgh, and Portland, Maine. She worked for agencies including Culver Pictures and the Campbell Studio, and around 1911, she partnered with the photographer Oscar Pach. She convinced celebrities who shied away from the press to pose for her, including Eleonore Reuss of Bulgaria, Grover Cleveland’s widow Frances Folsom Cleveland Preston and daughter Esther Cleveland, and Infanta Eulalia, a Spanish princess. In 1914, Madeleine Astor (widow of John Jacob Astor IV, who died on the Titanic) let Lillian publish photographs of the couple’s toddler, John Jacob Astor VI. The New York Press called Lillian “a woman who succeeds in photographing the impossible.” The New-York Tribune wrote, “Royalty and nobility have fallen in line before her lenses, and lords, lions and ladies of fashion have been placed in her private gallery.” Lillian also photographed nude dancers outdoors—Vogue called those images “exquisitely done”—and plutocrats’ homes. Her only book, with 56 photogravures, documented William Salomon’s mansion at 1020 Fifth Avenue. Copies of her Salomon book, as of 2018, have sold for as much as $1,000 each.

== Controversy and death ==
In 1915, Lillian offended leaders of the Camera Club of New York by refusing to deliver a message from one male member to another—the letter insulted its recipient as "a liar and traitor," she explained. The club administrators counter-accused her of keeping a messy studio and owing back dues, and she accused them in turn of prurient interest in her photos of nudes. She was ousted from the club, and she died a few weeks later while suffering from pneumonia and meningitis.

== Papers ==
A handful of institutions own Lillian’s letters, including the Library of Congress (she asked Woodrow Wilson's second wife Edith to pose), the Florence Griswold Museum in Old Lyme, Conn., Dartmouth’s Rauner Special Collections Library (the MacKaye family collection) and the Walter Hines Page collection at Harvard’s Houghton Library. The Radcliffe Institute’s Schlesinger Library owns Jessie Tarbox Beals’ photo of Lillian with her camera. The Boston Athenaeum owns her 1907 photo of Winslow Homer at his Maine studio in Prout's Neck, and the Maine Historical Society has her portrait of Walter's father Edward Griffin in its collection of Walter's papers.
