= Evelyn Andrus =

Canadian photographer

- Born: 1909; Hamilton, Ontario, Canada
- Died: 1972 (aged 62–63); Hamilton, Ontario, Canada
- Known for: Photography

Evelyn Andrus (1909–1972) was a Canadian photographer. She was the first woman to hold the position of president of the Toronto Camera Club.

== Biography ==
Andrus was born in 1909 in Hamilton, Ontario. She attended the University of Toronto. She became a portrait photographer in Hamilton.

She was active in the Toronto Camera Club (TCC), specifically serving as the chair of the education program and teaching portrait classes. In 1952, Andrus became TCC's first female president.

In addition to the TCC Andrus was a member of the Commercial and Press Photographers' Association of Canada, the Royal Photographic Society (RPS), and the Photographic Society of America (PSA). She eventually became director for the Eastern Canada Zone for the PSA. Andrus contributed articles to the TCC newsletter "Focus". She was the first Canadian woman to be made an associate of the RPS, with the recognition based on the quality of her colour photography.

Her photographic career ended with the onset of arthritis. Andrus died in Hamilton in 1972.
