= Toronto Camera Club =

Oldest photography club in Canada

- Formation: 1887
- Location(s): 587 Mount Pleasant Road Toronto, Ontario, Canada
- President: Kathryn Moore (2023-2024)
- Website: torontocameraclub.com
- Formerly called: Toronto Amateur Photographic Association

The Toronto Camera Club (TCC) is one of the oldest photography clubs in Canada. It was founded in 1887 and is situated in Toronto.

== History ==
The club originated as a specialized section of the Royal Canadian Institute (RCI), the Photographic Section became an independent organization in 1888. Originally named the Toronto Amateur Photographic Association, the organization changed its name to the Toronto Camera Club in 1891. The same year the club began showing exhibits of members' work.

In the late 19th century, there were few opportunities for formal photography training in Canada. Camera clubs such as this one provided its members with opportunities to study photography, network with fellow photographers, and experiment with the medium. Club members would participate in monthly critiques to develop their stylistic and technical skills. At the Toronto Camera Club, members could submit their photographs to be evaluated in categories such as portraiture, genre, still life, architecture, and landscape. As a large organization, the club also provided its members with access to equipment, studio space, and darkrooms.

The club held its first "Toronto International Salon of Photography" in May 1892 with 99 prints exhibited. By 1929 the Salon received over 1,200 entries from 35 countries. That year 370 prints were selected for exhibition.

In the organization's 1889 constitution, women were to be admitted with full membership status. This was a point of contention in the group until 1942, when the TCC confirmed women could participate with full membership privileges. In 1952, the club elected Evelyn Andrus as its first woman president.

== Affiliations ==
The Toronto Camera Club is affiliated with the Canadian Association for Photographic Art (CAPA), the Photographic Society of America (PSA), and the Ontario Council of Camera Clubs (OCCC).

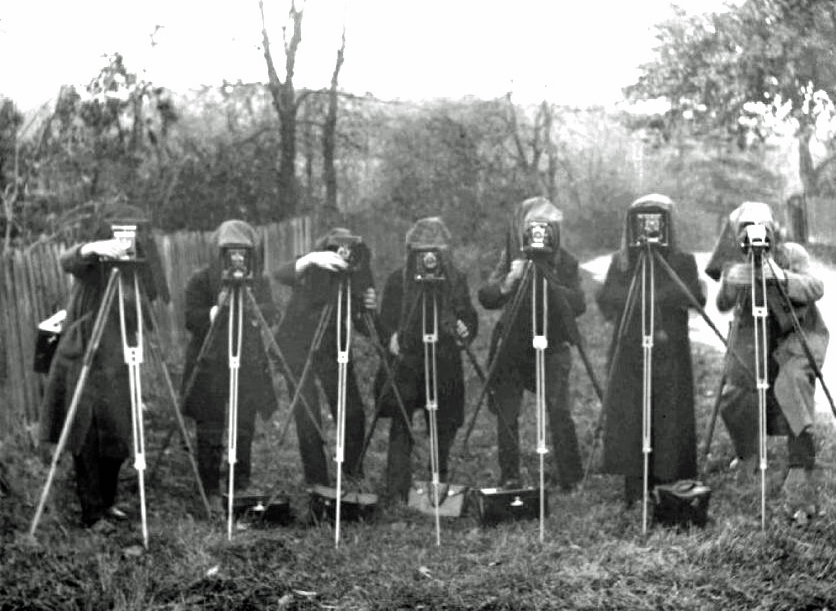
Toronto Camera Club by Edwin Haynes
