= Walter Griffin (painter) =

American painter

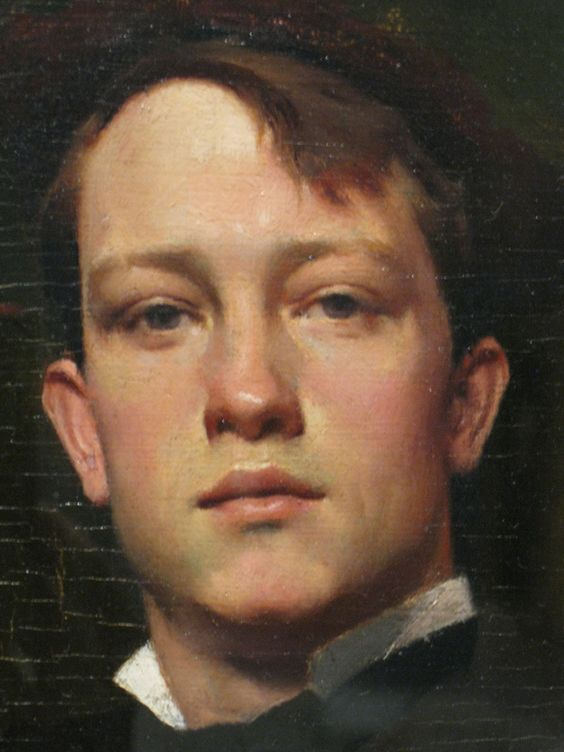
Walter Griffin by Dennis Miller Bunker (1881), Portland Museum of Art

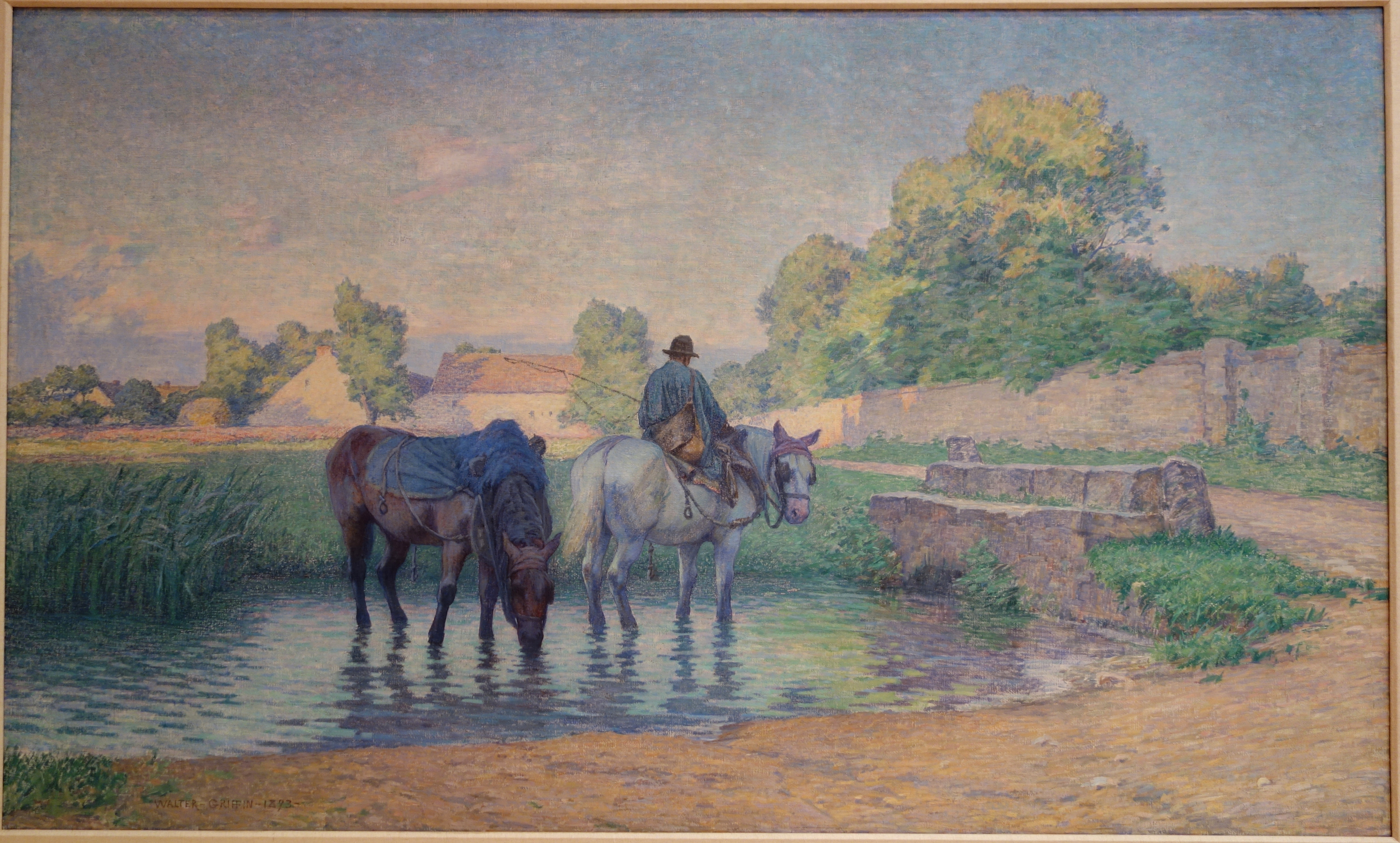
Scene at Fleury, France, 1893

Walter Parsons Shaw Griffin (1861–1935) was an American painter.

Griffin was born in Portland, Maine, where his father carved ship figureheads. In 1877 he entered the School of the Museum of Fine Arts in Boston as a scholarship student, and in 1885 entered the Academy school in New York City, where he remained through 1887 while teaching at the Ethical Culture Society. He moved to Paris in 1887, where he studied at the École des Beaux-Arts and exhibited at the Salon of 1889. In 1890 he settled in Fleury, where he traveled and painted in the Barbizon area. By the late 1890s, he opened the Walter Griffin's Summer Painting School in Quebec City, Canada, and in 1898 began teaching at the Art Society of Hartford, Connecticut, moving to Old Lyme, Connecticut, in 1904.

He was the husband of British-born American journalist and photographer Lillian Baynes Griffin (1871–1916). After his divorce in 1908, he passed the years 1909–1918 in Europe, returning to Portland, Maine's Stroudwater neighborhood from 1918 until 1922, then living in France from 1923 to 1933. In 1933 he returned to Portland, where he lived until his death.
