= Sarah Choate Sears =

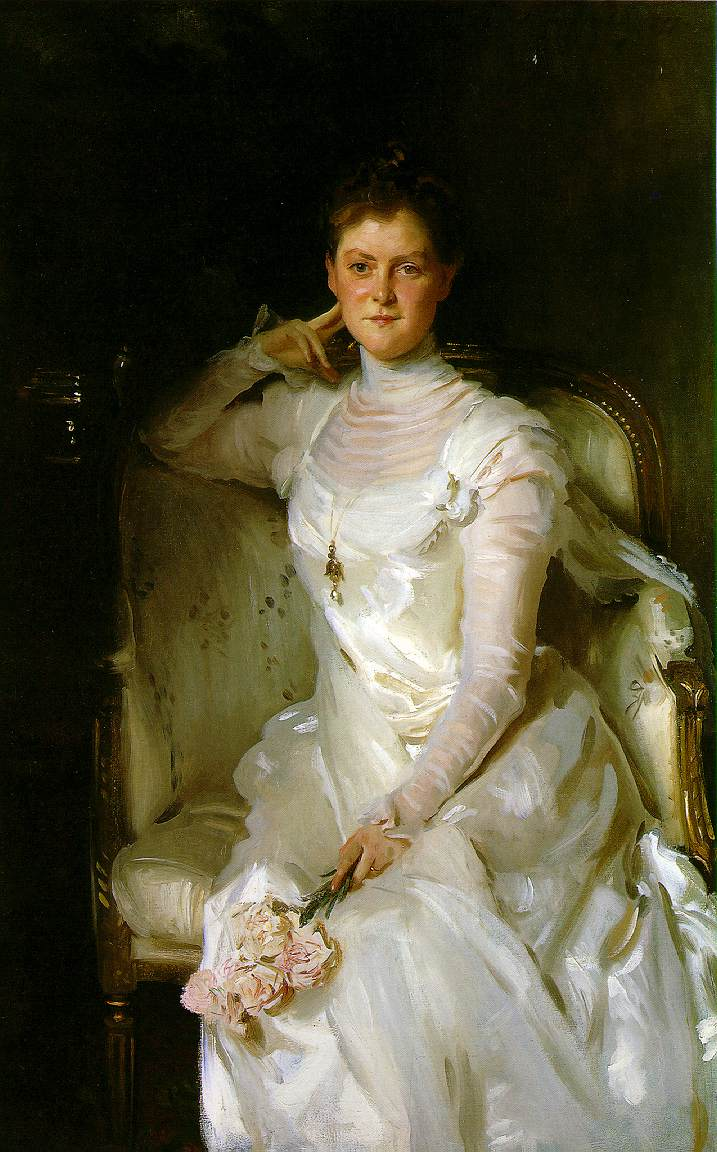
- 1889 portrait of Sarah Choate Sears by John Singer Sargent.
- Born: Sarah Carlisle Choate; May 5, 1858; Cambridge, Massachusetts
- Died: September 25, 1935 (aged 77); West Gouldsboro, Maine
- Known for: Photography
- Spouse: Joshua Montgomery Sears (m. 1877–1905)

Sarah Choate Sears (1858–1935) was an American art collector, art patron, cultural entrepreneur, artist and photographer.

== Early life ==
Sears, née Sarah Carlisle Choate, was born in Cambridge, Massachusetts on 5 May 1858, the daughter of Charles Francis and Elizabeth Carlisle Choate. Her family was one of the Boston Brahmins, a prominent class of cultural society in New England.

In 1876 she studied painting at the Cowles Art School in Boston and later attended courses at the Museum of Fine Arts a few blocks away.

In 1877 she married real estate magnate Joshua Montgomery Sears (1854–1905), one of the wealthiest men in Boston. The combination of her own family’s wealth and that of her new husband meant that she would live a life of leisure, free to pursue whatever interested her.

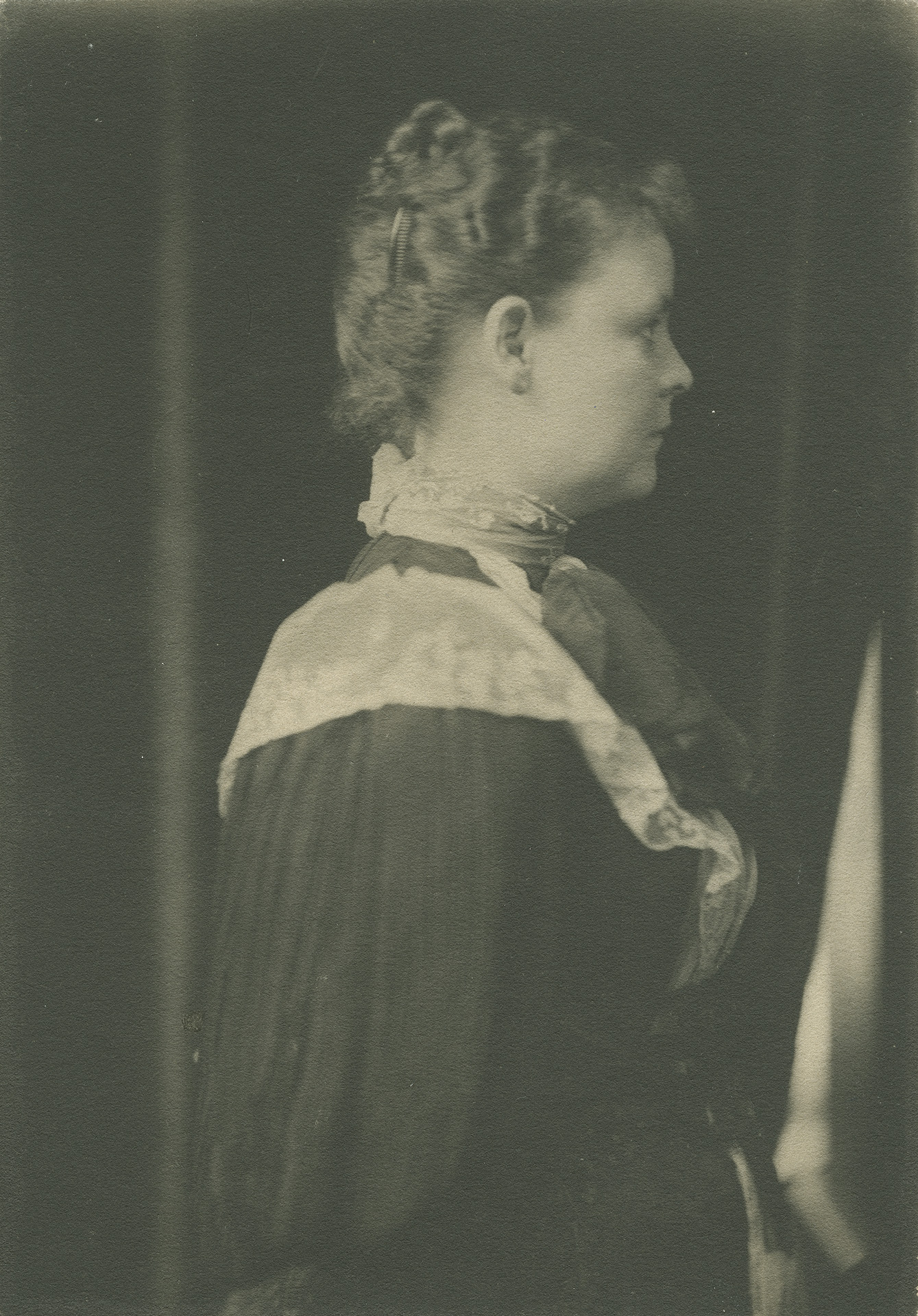
Sarah Choate Sears, c. 1900, platinum print, Department of Image Collections, National Gallery of Art Library, Washington, DC

She continued her art studies and won prizes for her watercolors at the World’s Columbian Exposition in Chicago (1893), the Universal Exposition in Paris (1900), the Pan-American Exposition in Buffalo (1901) and the Louisiana Purchase Exposition in Saint Louis (1904).

== Photography and later life ==
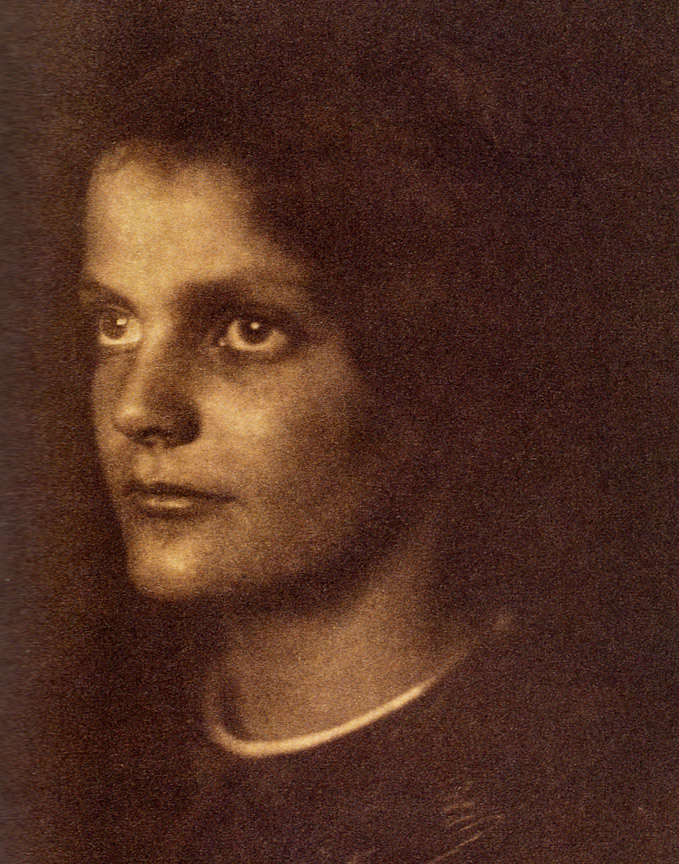
"Mary", by Sarah C. Sears. Photogravure published in Camera Work, No 18, 1907

About 1890 she began exploring photography, and soon she was participating in local salons. She joined the Boston Camera Club in 1892, and her beautiful portraits and still lifes attracted the attention of fellow Boston photographer F. Holland Day. Soon her work was gaining international attention.

At the same time she was pursuing her photography interest, she and her husband hosted cultural parties in Boston. They often featured private symphonic performances and included many international composers and performers, including Ignacy Paderewski, Serge Koussevitsky and Dame Nellie Melba.

In 1899 she was given a one-woman show at the Boston Camera Club, and in 1900 she had several prints in Frances Benjamin Johnson’s famous exhibition in Paris.

In early 1900 she met American Impressionist Mary Cassatt, and they were friends for the remainder of Cassatt's life. During this same period she was elected as a member of the prestigious photographic associations: the Linked Ring in London and Alfred Stieglitz’s Photo-Secession in New York.

In 1904 she stopped working to care for her ailing husband, and after his death a year later she devoted herself to managing the family’s finances for a brief period. She then traveled throughout Europe with Cassatt and Gertrude Stein, collecting more art and living a highly glamorous lifestyle among artists, musicians and writers. Added by the advice of Cassatt, she began to collect early Impressionist paintings by Edgar Degas, Édouard Manet and others.

Her collection included Manet’s well-known ‘’Street Singer’’, later donated by her to the Museum of Fine Arts.

Under the guidance of Stieglitz, she also collected modernist paintings by Maurice Prendergast, Arthur B. Davies, Paul Cézanne, Georges Braque and Henri Matisse. She took a particular interest in Prendergast, arranging for his first Boston exhibition and later paying for him to study in Europe.

In 1907, two of her photographs were published in Camera Work, but by that time she had lost much of her interest in photography. She continued to paint watercolors for the rest of her life but rarely photographed again.

She died in West Gouldsboro, Maine, on 25 September 1935. Her home is a stop on the Boston Women's Heritage Trail.
