= Marija Braut =

Croatian photographer

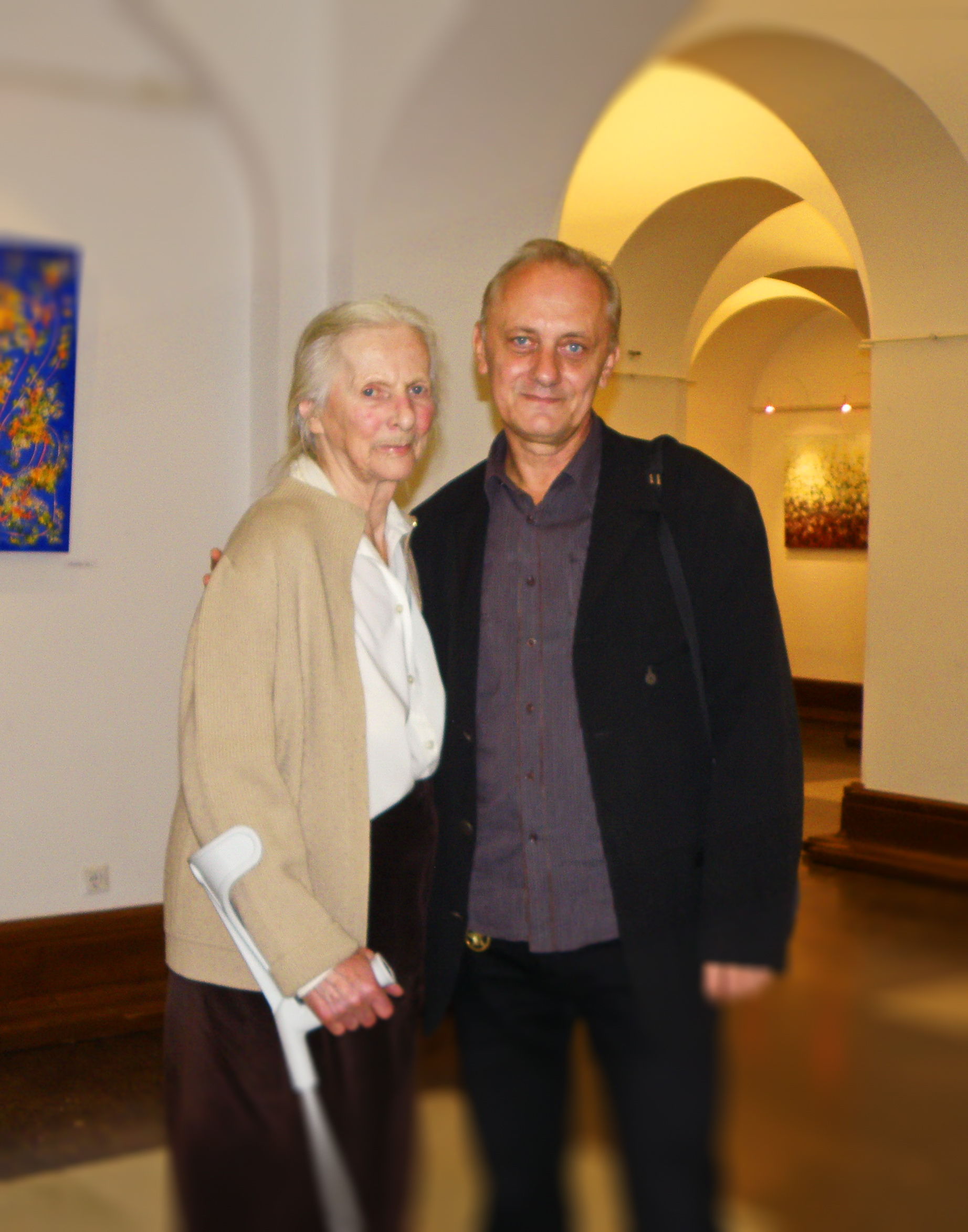
- Marija Braut and Miroslav Vajdić
- Born: Marija Kračun; 7 August 1929; Celje, Kingdom of Yugoslavia (now Slovenia)
- Died: 1 July 2015 (aged 85); Zagreb, Croatia
- Occupation: Photographer
- Years active: 1967 - 2015
- Spouse: Sead Saračević
- Children: 2

Marija Braut (7 August 1929, in Celje – 1 July 2015, in Zagreb) was a Croatian photographer and one of the most significant artistic successors of the so-called Zagreb School of Photography.

== Biography ==
Mary Braut was born on 7 August 1929 in Celje. Her family moved to Zagreb in 1941. After finishing high school in 1949, she enrolled at the Zagreb Faculty of Architecture. As a young girl, she danced and sang in the National Folk Dance Ensemble of Croatia LADO where she met her husband Sead Saračević. The couple had two children. In 1967, she found out that Saračević had a mistress, so she left him. In order to earn a living, she started photographing. Namely, as she later stated, Tošo Dabac pushed the camera into her hands, sent her to the street and said, "photograph". At first, she was Dabac's pupil and later associate. She held a first independent exhibition in 1969 in the gallery of the Zagreb Student Center. In the same year, she was admitted to the membership of the Croatian Association of Artists of Applied Arts (ULUPUH).

Braut worked in the Galleries of the City of Zagreb (today's Museum of Contemporary Art) where she photographed for catalogs and portraits of many artists. Since 1972, she has worked as an independent artist. She has exhibited her art photography on more than a hundred independent and group exhibitions. Many of her photographs have been published in both the newspapers and specialized journals. As a photographer, she also cooperated with many Croatian theaters and festivals, such as the Croatian National Theater in Zagreb, Zagreb Youth Theater, Gavella Drama Theater, Kerempuh Theater and Dubrovnik Summer Festival. She was also an official photographer on the set of the most expensive movie of Yugoslav production, Battle of Sutjeska. She photographed children, people in the streets, various portraits, artists during the work, landscapes of various regions, war destruction, Dalmatian cities, and above all, Zagreb.

She exhibited in: Zagreb - 1969 (with Petar Dabcem), 1971, 1977, 1979 ("Umjetnici naših dana" [Artists of Our Days]), 1980, 1986 ("Zagreb - Moj grad" [Zagreb - My Town]), 1988, Maribor and Ljubljana - 1970, Split - 1971, Mannheim - 1972 ""Tošo Dabac und sein Atelier" [Tošo Dabac and his Atelier]), Dubrovnik - 1978, and Velika Gorica - 1983. Braut held the last large exhibition, consisting of her then unknown and less exposed photographs, at the Zagreb Art Pavilion in 2014. Her photographs and thousands of negatives are kept in collections of many Zagreb museums, Croatian State Archives, Croatian Academy of Sciences and Arts, Croatian Ministry of Defense and elsewhere.

She received many awards, including the Zagreb City Award (1972) and the Lifetime Achievements Award of the Croatian Association of Artists of Applied Arts (2008). Documentary about her life, "Mary walks alone", was recorded in 2009.

Marija Braut died on 1 July 2015, aged 85.

== List of monographs ==
- Zdravo maleni [Hello Little One], Šibenik 1980.
- Maksimir, Zagreb 1982.
- Dagomys INGRA, Zagreb 1983.
- Zagreb – moj grad [Zagreb - My City], Globus/Mladinska knjiga, Zagreb 1987.
- Dubrovnik – jedno lice rata [Dubrovnik - One Face of War], 1994.
- Maksimir 200, Grad Zagreb, Zagreb 1994.
- Dubrovnik ponovljen [Dubrovnik Repeated], LMN d.o.o. 2001.
- Marija Braut – Retrospektiva [Marija Braut - Retrospective], Marina Viculin, Galerija Klovićevi dvori 2001.
- Marija Braut – fotografije 1967. – 2005. [Marija Braut - photographes 1967 - 2005], Ive Šimat Banov, 2006.
- Marija Braut – Moj Zagreb u koloru [Marija Braut - My Zagreb in Color], Iva Prosoli, Muzej grada Zagreba 2009.
- Novi Zagreb Jučer [New Zagreb Yesterday], Marija Braut i Mario Rozić, Anita Zlomislić, Centar za kulturu Novi Zagreb 2012
