= Charles R. Cross (physicist) =

American physicist and educator (1848–1921)

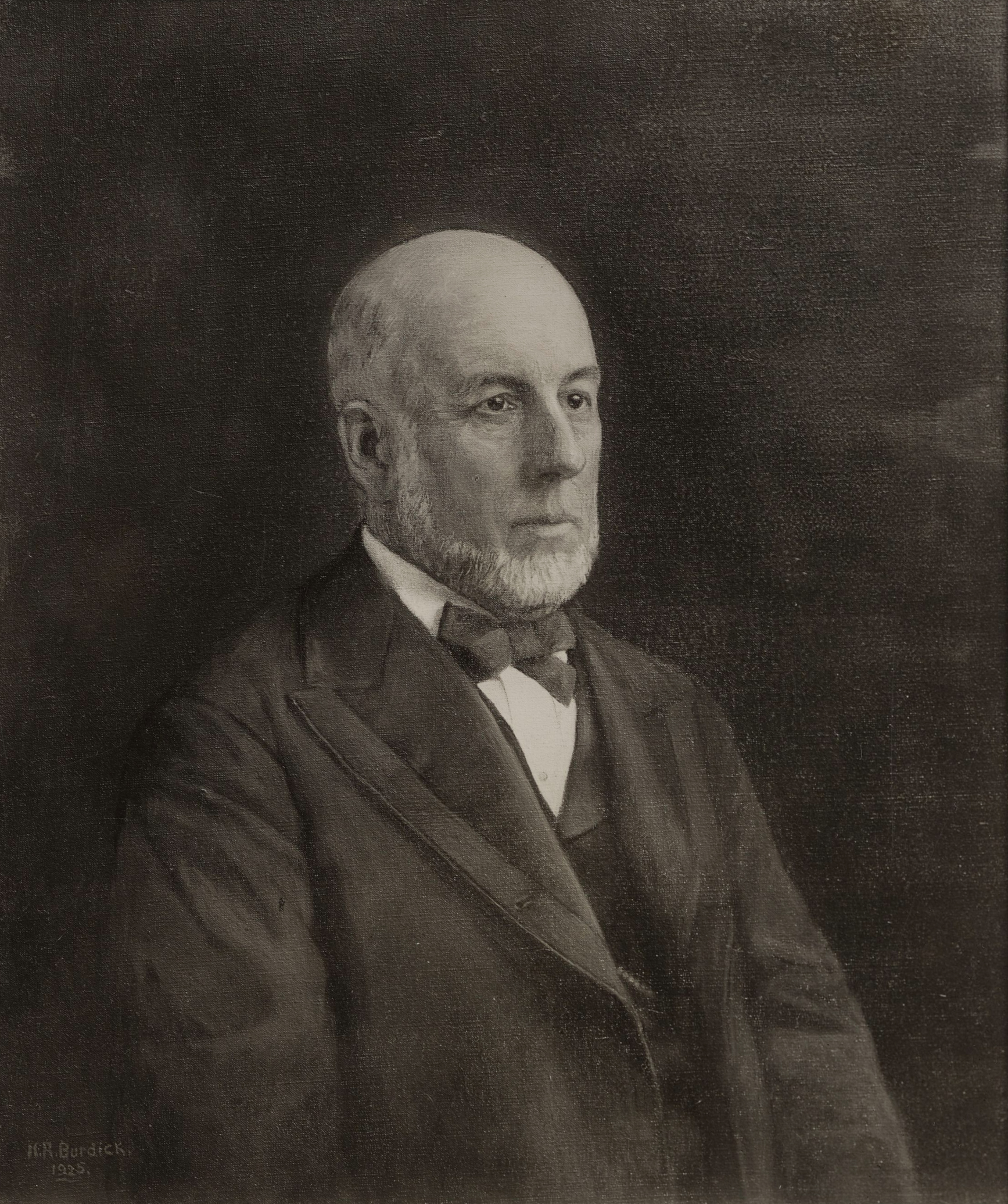
- Portrait of Cross by H. R. Burdick (1925)
- Born: March 29, 1848; Troy, New York, U.S.
- Died: November 16, 1921 (aged 73); Brookline, Massachusetts, U.S.
- Education: Putnam Free School (1865); Massachusetts Institute of Technology, B.S. (1870)

3rd Chair of the Physics Department at the Massachusetts Institute of Technology
- In office 1877–1917
- Preceded by: Edward Pickering
- Succeeded by: Edwin Bidwell Wilson

Charles Robert Cross (March 29, 1848 – November 16, 1921) was an American physicist and chair of the physics department at the Massachusetts Institute of Technology from 1877 to 1917.

== Biography ==
Cross was born March 29, 1848, in Troy, New York to George Cross and Lucy Ann Brown. When he was 14, his family moved to Newburyport, Massachusetts where he attended the Putnam Free School, graduating in 1865. He entered the Massachusetts Institute of Technology as a sophomore in 1867 and graduated in 1870 with a Bachelor of Science. Following graduation, he became instructor in physics, assistant professor in 1871, and full professor in 1875. Cross became chair of the MIT physics department in 1877, after the resignation of Edward Pickering.

In 1882, Cross developed and taught the first course in electrical engineering in the country. He instructed on telegraphy, telephony, and dynamo electric machinery. He taught this course until 1902, when he established the Department of Electrical Engineering. In 1900, Cross established a course in electrochemistry, the first in the United States. In 1913, he established a course in industrial physics.

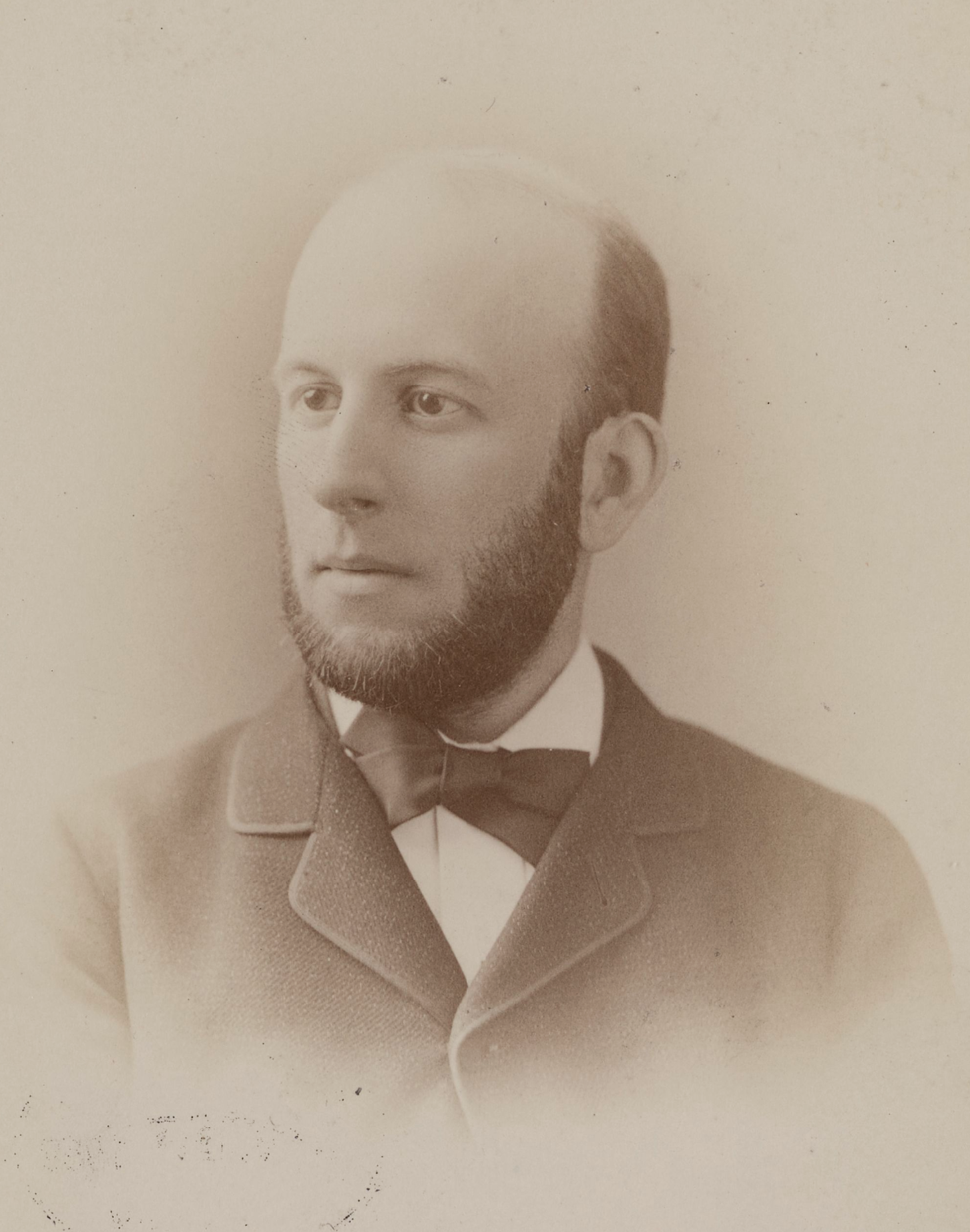
Cross in 1886

Cross was an authority on acoustics and musical pitch as well as the studies of telephony. He was the leading scientific expert of the Bell Telephone Company. Cross was also a lecturer on experimental physics. He lectured on subjects such as electric waves, wireless telegraphy, radioactivity, and polarized light at MIT and on light, sound, electricity at the Lowell Institute.

Cross was a member of numerous academic associations, institutes, and societies. He was a fellow of the American Association for the Advancement of Science, British Association for the Advancement of Science, American Academy of Arts and Sciences, American Physical Society, Physical Society of France, American Institute of Electrical Engineers, and American Astronomical Society. In addition, Cross was President of the Appalachian Mountain Club in 1880 and the Chairman of the Rumford Committee of the American Academy of Arts and Sciences from 1897 to 1921.

Cross married Mariana Pike in 1873 (1847–1900) and had one son, Charles Robert Cross Jr. (1881–1915) who died in France during World War I. Cross died November 16, 1921, at his Pill Hill home in Brookline, Massachusetts.

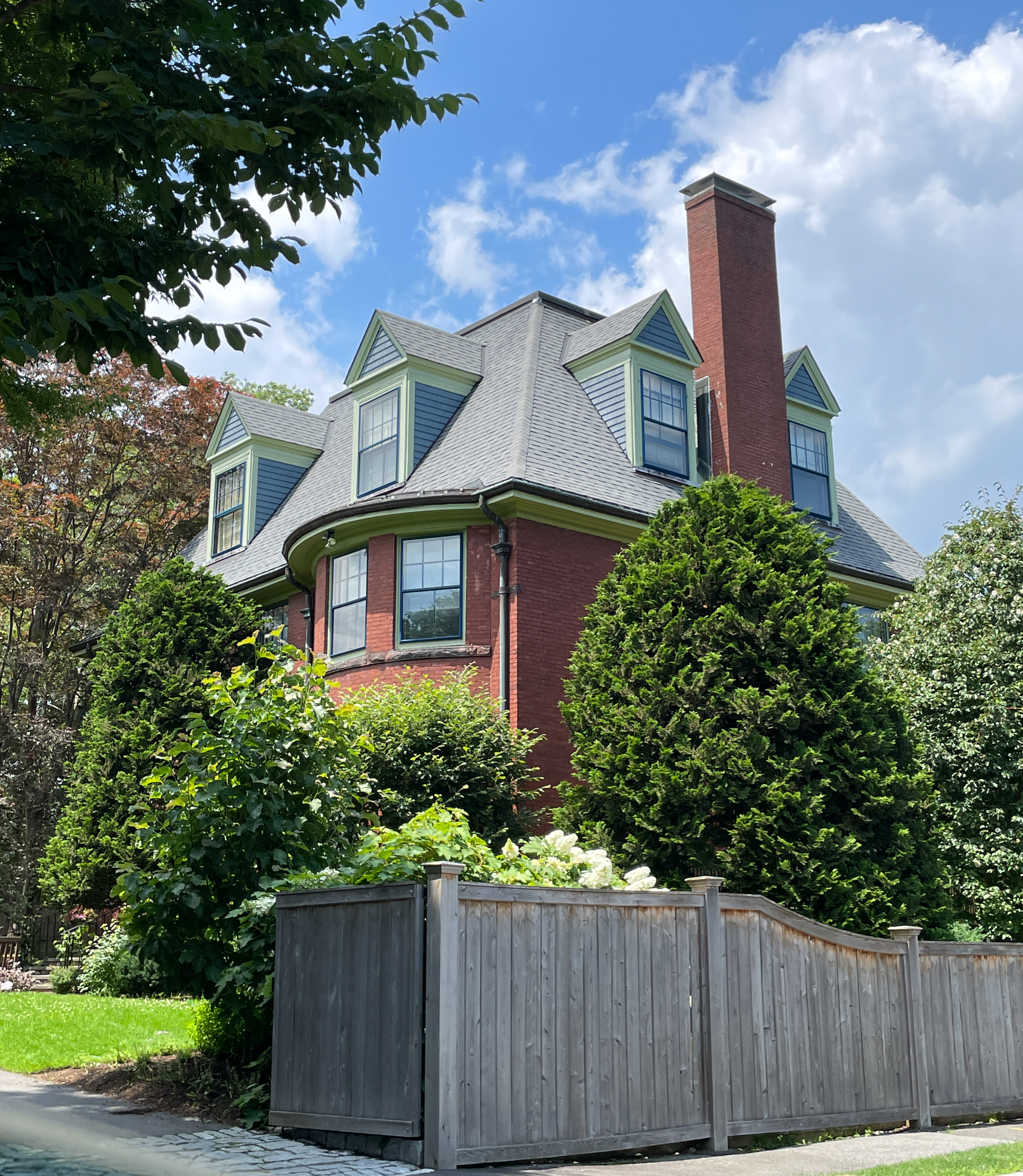
Cross' Brookline residence, 100 Upland Road, designed by Peabody & Stearns

== Publications ==
- On The Focal Length of Microscopic Objectives (1870)
- Course in Elementary Physics (1873)
- Experiments with the Thermal Telephone (1885)
- Experiments on the Melting Platinum Standard of Light (1886)
- The Inverse Electromotive Force of the Voltaic Arc (1886) with William E. Shepard
- Notes on Equal Temperament and the Character of Musical Keys (1886)
- Researches on Microphone Currents (1889) with Annie Ware Sabine
- The Extent of the Excursion of the Electrodes of a Microphone Transmitter (1890)
- Some Considerations Regarding Helmholtz's Theory of Consonance (1891) with Harry M. Goodwin
- Least Number of Vibrations Necessary to Determine Pitch (1892) with Margaret Eliza Maltby
- An Investigation of the Excursion of the Diaphragm of a Telephone Receiver (1893) with Arthur N. Mansfield and The Excursion of the Diaphragm of a Telephone Receiver (1893) with Henry M. Phillips
- Experiments with the Phonograph Relating to the Vowel Theory of Helmholtz (1893) with George V. Wendell
- Historical Notes Relating to Musical Pitch in the United States (1900)
- Notes on Mechanics (1911)
- Biographical Memoir of James Mason Crafts, 1839–1917 (1919)
