= Gloucester Fisherman's Memorial =

- U.S. National Register of Historic Places
- The memorial in 2021

- Location within Massachusetts Location within the United States
- Location: Gloucester, Massachusetts
- Coordinates: 42°36′36.5″N 70°40′13.3″W
- Built: 1925
- Architects: Craske, Leonard F.
- Architectural style: Modeled After Clayton Morrissey
- MPS: Gloucester MPS
- NRHP reference No.: 96000473
- Added to NRHP: May 7, 1996

Gloucester Fisherman's Memorial (also known as: Man at the Wheel or Fishermen's Memorial Cenotaph) is a historic memorial cenotaph sculpture on South Stacy Boulevard, near entrance of Stacy Esplanade in Gloucester, Massachusetts, erected in 1925.

== Description ==
It is an 8-foot-tall (2.4 m), bronze statue of a fisherman dressed in oilskins standing braced at the wheel on the sloping deck of his ship. The monument has a square base of sea green granite. It is positioned so that the fisherman is looking out over Gloucester Harbor. The fisherman in the sculpture was modeled after Capt. Clayton Morrissey and his cousin Richard Hannon of New Foundland two prominent Gloucester fisherman, once the captain of the Effie M. Morrissey. The stone was purposely sculpted with a rough finish to make the fisherman look rugged. Craske posed the fisherman to look as if he was facing a windstorm and was headed toward dangerous rocks. His eyes are fixed on the water and sails, while every muscle is strained to hold the wheel with a firm grip. A small plaque on the north or street-facing side of the base reads, "Memorial To The Gloucester Fisherman, August 23, 1923". A larger recessed panel on the front or harbor-facing side of the base holds an inscription of bronze letters taken from the Bible's Psalm 107:23, which reads: "They That Go Down To The Sea In Ships 1623-1923".

== History ==
The English sculptor Leonard Craske (1882–1950) designed the sculpture, and it was cast by the Gorham Company of Providence, Rhode Island, in 1925. According to the National Park Service:

The Gloucester Tercentenary Permanent Memorial Association sponsored an artistic competition to commemorate Gloucester's 300th anniversary and to permanently memorialize the thousands of fishermen lost at sea in the first three centuries of Gloucester's history. In 1879 alone, 249 fishermen and 29 vessels were lost during a terrible storm. In preparing for the competition, Craske spent many hours aboard fishing schooners, sketching and photographing fishermen at work. His design was accepted and cast at a cost of $10,000. Generally acknowledged as Craske's finest work, the Gloucester Fisherman's Memorial is viewed by thousands of visitors annually and has become a symbol of the city, commemorating Gloucester's link to the sea.

The Gloucester Fisherman's Memorial was added to the National Register of Historic Places in 1996.

== See also ==
- National Register of Historic Places listings in Gloucester, Massachusetts
- National Register of Historic Places listings in Essex County, Massachusetts
