= Arne Braut =

Norwegian politician (born 1950)

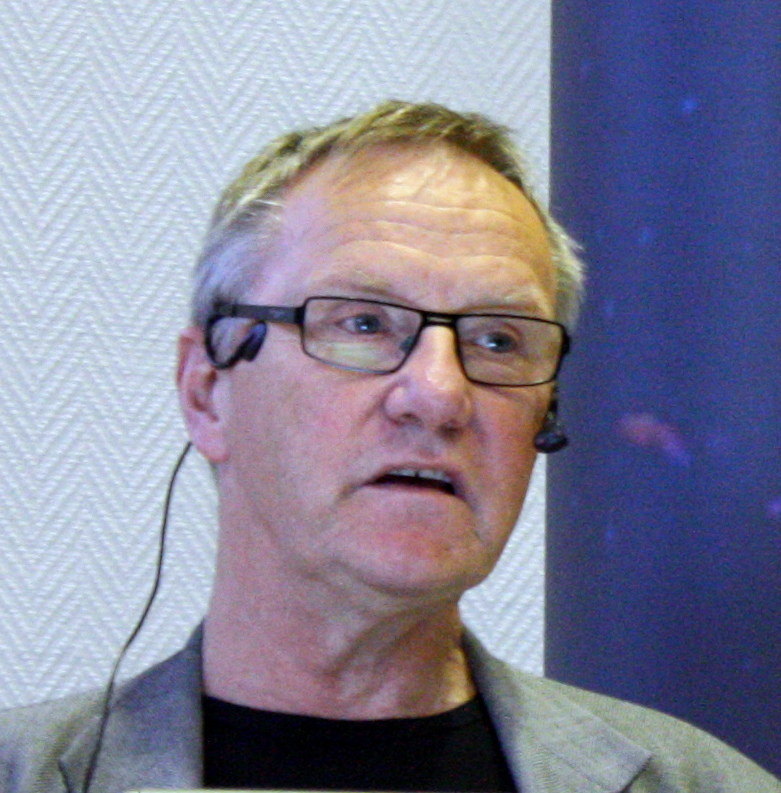
Arne Braut

Arne Braut (born 11 October 1950) is a Norwegian politician for the Centre Party.

He served as a deputy representative to the Norwegian Parliament from Sør-Trøndelag during the term 2001–2005.

On the local level, he has background from the municipal council of Oppdal Municipality. Furthermore, he was the deputy chairman of the county council of Sør-Trøndelag from 2007 to 2015 and was a member of the council for a little over twenty years.
