= Leonard Craske =

American sculptor (1880–1950)

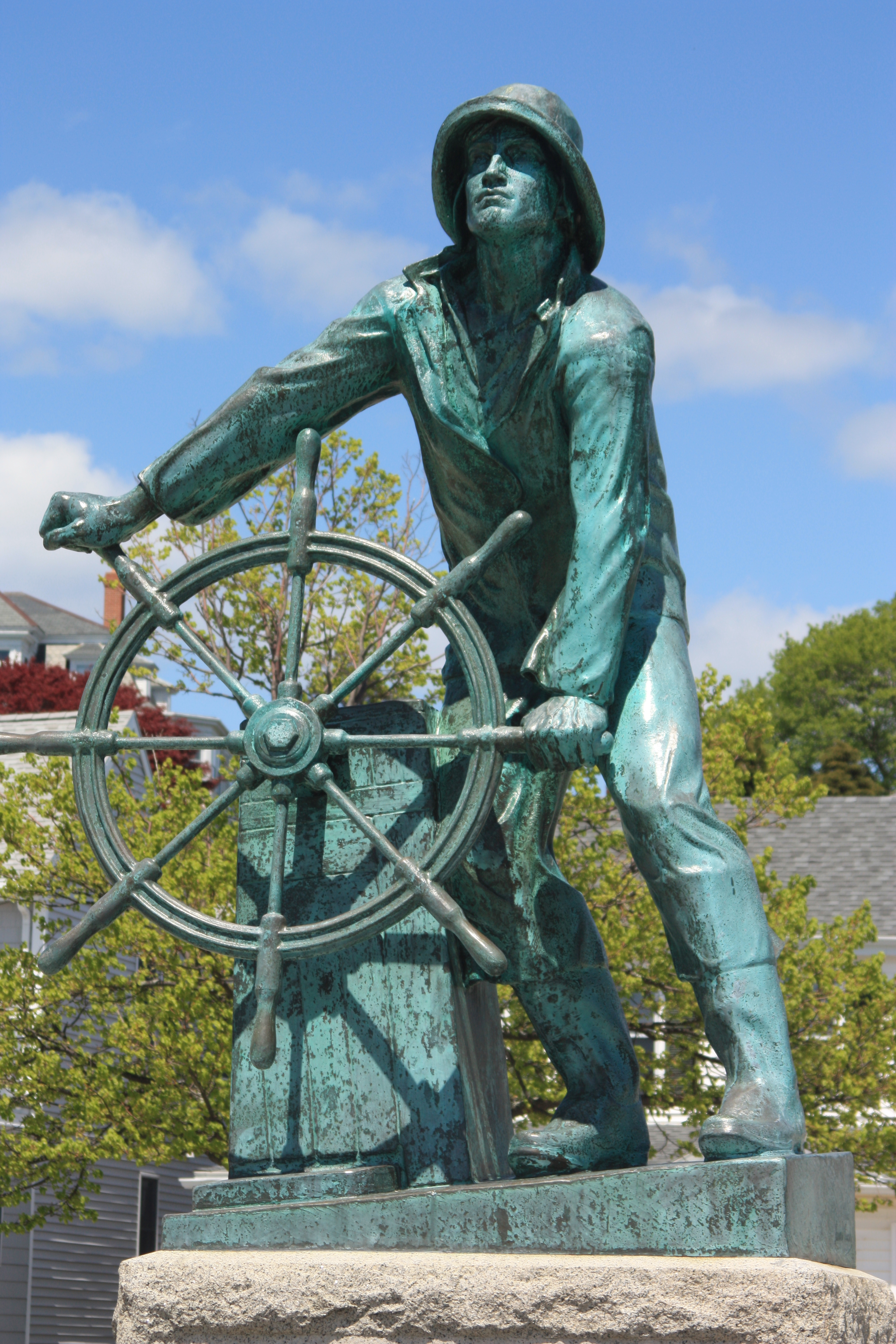
- Gloucester Fisherman's Memorial
- Born: 19 September 1880; London, England
- Died: 29 August 1950 (aged 69)
- Occupation: sculptor

Leonard Craske (19 September 1880 – 29 August 1950) was a sculptor.

Craske was born and raised in London. After emigrating to the United States and settling in Boston, he became an accomplished sculptor, creating the well-known Gloucester Fisherman's Memorial in Gloucester, Massachusetts, the work for which he is best remembered. His work was part of the sculpture event in the art competition at the 1932 Summer Olympics.
