= Eleanor Parke Custis (artist) =

American artist (1897–1983)

- Born: July 28, 1897; Washington, D.C., U.S.
- Died: July 23, 1983 (aged 85); Gloucester, Massachusetts, U.S.
- Resting place: Congressional Cemetery; Washington, D.C., U.S.
- Known for: Painting; Photography
- Movement: Pictorialism

Eleanor Parke Custis (July 28, 1897 – July 23, 1983) was an American artist, mostly known for pictorialist photography. She was a direct descendant of Martha Washington from her first marriage to Daniel Parke Custis.

== Biography ==
Eleanor Parke Custis was born in 1897. She never married and lived most of her life in Washington, D.C. After the death of her father, with whom she lived till 1960, she moved to Gloucester, Massachusetts.

=== Career ===
Eleanor Parke Custis studied in Corcoran School of the Arts and Design under Edmund C. Tarbell and Pennsylvania Academy of the Fine Arts with Henry B. Snell. Initially, she began her art career as a painter, creating watercolors. Custis created illustrations for Scribner's Magazine, Harper's, Doubleday, Harcourt. She started to take photographs in her youth, using a Brownie camera, switching to professional photography in the 1930s, following a trip abroad. Eleanor Parke Custis used The bromoil process, invented in 1907, bleaching a print on bromide paper in order to remove the blackened silver. The areas of a picture that need to be dark are then painted using a brush. Custis studied at the Corcoran School of Art with Edmund Tarbell and Henry B. Snell. She was a member of the American Watercolor Society, the Boston Art Club, National Association of Women Painters and Sculptors and other art associations. In 1935 Eleanor Parke Custis wrote and illustrated a photography book - "Composition and Pictures".

Custis' technique was different from many other American pictorialists. She made her images softly focused, using a "Flou-Net" enlarging diffuser, invented by Belgian pictorialist Léonard Misonne. This technique produced dark halos along the edges of shadowed areas, creating a romantic effect which was well suited to the travel photographs she made in Europe and South America.

== Exhibitions ==
Eleanor Parke Custis participated in more than 880 exhibitions during her lifetime. She had several exhibitions in Grand Central Art Galleries in New York City.

=== Solo ===
- 1925: Arts Club of Washington. Watercolors.
- 1940: Brooklyn Museum
- 1945: Grand Central Art Galleries
- 1947: Smithsonian Institution
- 1996: Bruce Museum of Arts and Science. Port of Dreams: The Photography of Eleanor Parke Custis .

== Collections ==
Works by Eleanor Parke Custis are in permanent collections of many American museums, including Cape Ann Museum, Indianapolis Museum of Art and Peabody Essex Museum.
