= Lou Jones (photographer) =

American photographer

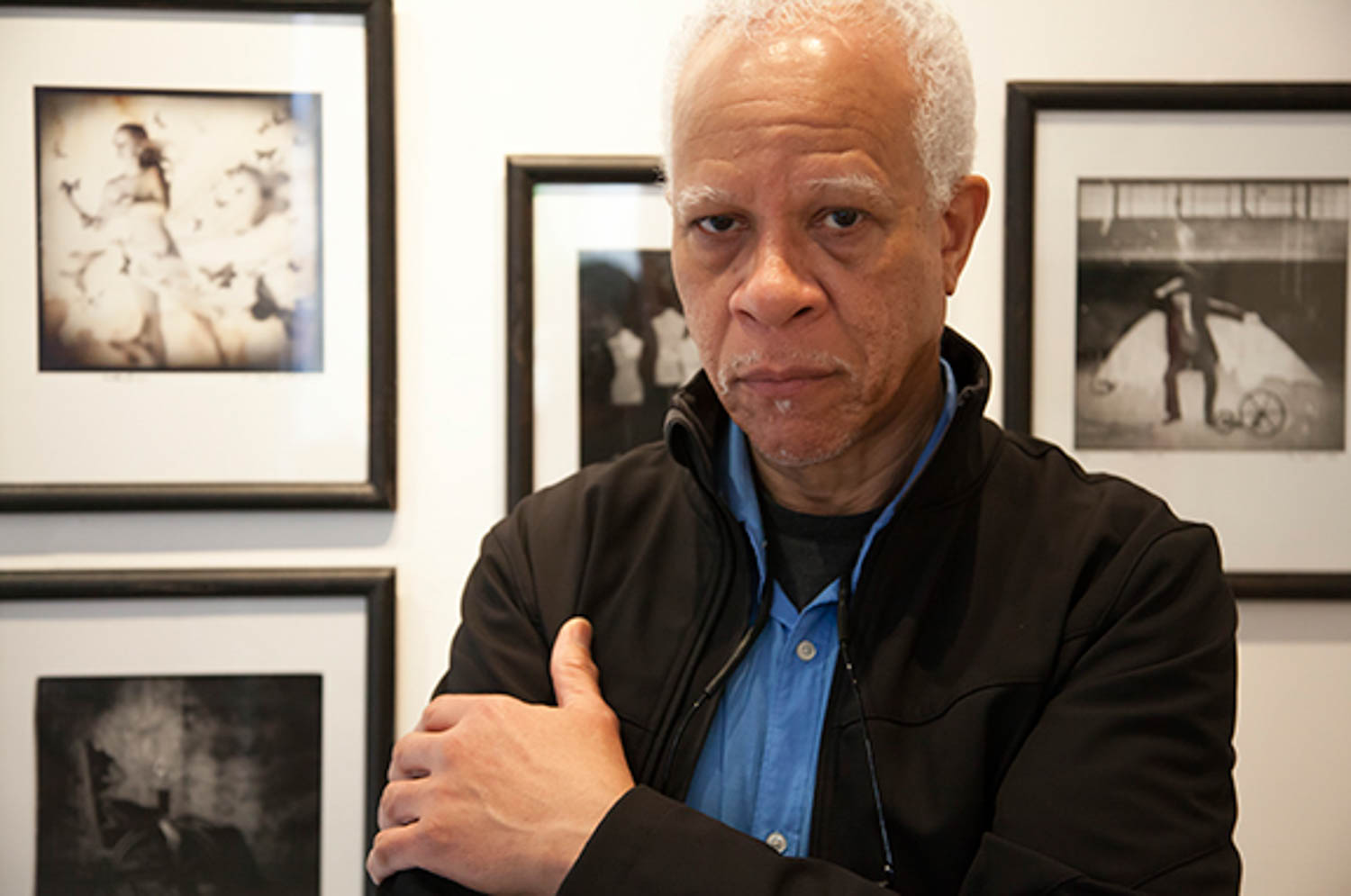
- Born: 1945 (age 80–81); Washington, DC
- Education: Rensselaer Polytechnic Institute
- Board member of: American Society of Media Photographers, Griffin Museum of Photography Photographic Resource Center
- Website: www.fotojones.com

Lou Jones (born 1945) is an American photographer, living in Boston. He specializes in advertising and corporate photography. His career ranges from photojournalism covering warfare in Central America and humanitarian causes, to sports photography documenting 13 consecutive Olympics, and to jazz portraits including Miles Davis, Milt Jackson, and Charles Mingus.

== Early life and education ==
Jones was born and raised in Washington, D.C. in 1945. His father, Leon Jones, worked for the USPS in information services. His mother, Landonia Jones, worked for the Department of Health, Education, and Welfare.

Jones graduated from Gonzaga High School and received a Bachelor of Science in physics from Rensselaer Polytechnic Institute. After working for a summer with NASA as a rocket scientist, he attended Rensselaer pursuing a graduate degree in physics.

== Career ==
Jones began his photography career in 1971. His commercial clients have included IBM, Major League Baseball, Federal Express, Peugeot, Museum of Fine Arts, Paris Match, KLM, National Geographic, People Magazine, Nike, Price Waterhouse, and Aetna.

He has photographed historic events such as the fall of the Berlin Wall, the Million Man March, and twelve successive Olympic Games. In the 1980s he accompanied U.S. congressmen to Nicaragua, El Salvador, Guatemala, and Honduras on CODELs (COngressional DELegations) documenting government, military and rebel leaders.

In 1990, the Museum of Afro-American History commissioned Jones to honor women with "Sojourner's Daughters". This project led Aetna to hire Jones to photograph their annual African American History calendars through 2011.

Jones was president of the New England chapter of the American Society of Media Photographers from 1982 to 1986.

On 11 April 2013, Jones was featured in the premiere episode of USA Network's The Moment. Hosted by Kurt Warner, the show featured ordinary people seeking a second chance at their dream career. Jones was the on screen mentor to aspiring sports photographer Tracey Marcum, providing shooting tips and critiques of her photos.

Since 2013, Jones has been working with developer Millennium Partners to document the construction of their high-profile developments around Boston. Jones' project, called Ironclad Construction Photography, documents not only the steel and glass rising to form the sixty-story landmark, but also the diverse tradespeople risking their lives high above downtown Boston. Since the completion of Millennium Tower in 2016, Jones has continued to work with Millennium Partners photographing the construction of Winthrop Center Tower, a 52-story tower going up in the downtown Boston.

He is currently working on his panAFRICAproject, photographing contemporary Africa in a documentary style. The more than decade-long project features diverse images from many tribes and nations, documenting the social, economic, and cultural dynamism of modern Africa. Collections from the project have so far been exhibited at the Boston Arts Academy, Mount Ida College and Cape Cod Museum of Art.

Jones published his first book in 1997, Final Exposure: Portraits from Death Row. For six years he documented men and women on death rows in the United States. It was republished in the fall of 2002. For this Jones received the Ehrmann Award from the Massachusetts Citizens against the Death Penalty. His second book, travel+PHOTOGRAPHY: off the charts, was published in 2006. In collaboration with New England College Press, Jones interviewed and photographed 14 imprisoned writers for his book Exiled Voices: Portals of Discovery. Jones' newest book, Speedlights & Speedlites: Creative Flash Photography at Lightspeed, was released in May 2009 and is in its second printing.

== Publications ==
- Final Exposure: Portraits from Death Row (1997)
- travel+Photography: off the charts (2006)
- Exiled Voices: Portals of Discovery. Jones' newest book, Speedlights & Speedlites: Creative Flash Photography at Lightspeed (2009)

== Exhibitions ==
- Smithsonian
- Corcoran Galleries, Washington, D.C.
- Polaroid Gallery
- San Francisco Museum of Modern Art
- DeCordova Museum, Massachusetts
- Cooper Hewitt Museum, New York City
- Detroit Institute of Arts
- Feuerwagner, Austria

== Collections ==
Jones's work is held in the following permanent collections:

- Fogg Museum (Harvard)
- Wellesley College
- Middle Tennessee State University
- University of Texas

== Awards and recognition ==
- 2000: Professional Photographers Leadership Award, International Photographic Council (United Nations)
- Nikon "Legend Behind the Lens"
- Lowepro Champion
- Ehrmann Award, Massachusetts Citizens against the Death Penalty for Final Exposure: Portraits from Death Row
- 2018: Massachusetts Artists Leaders Coalition Champion of Artists Award
