= Jessie Tarbox Beals =

American photographer (1870–1942)

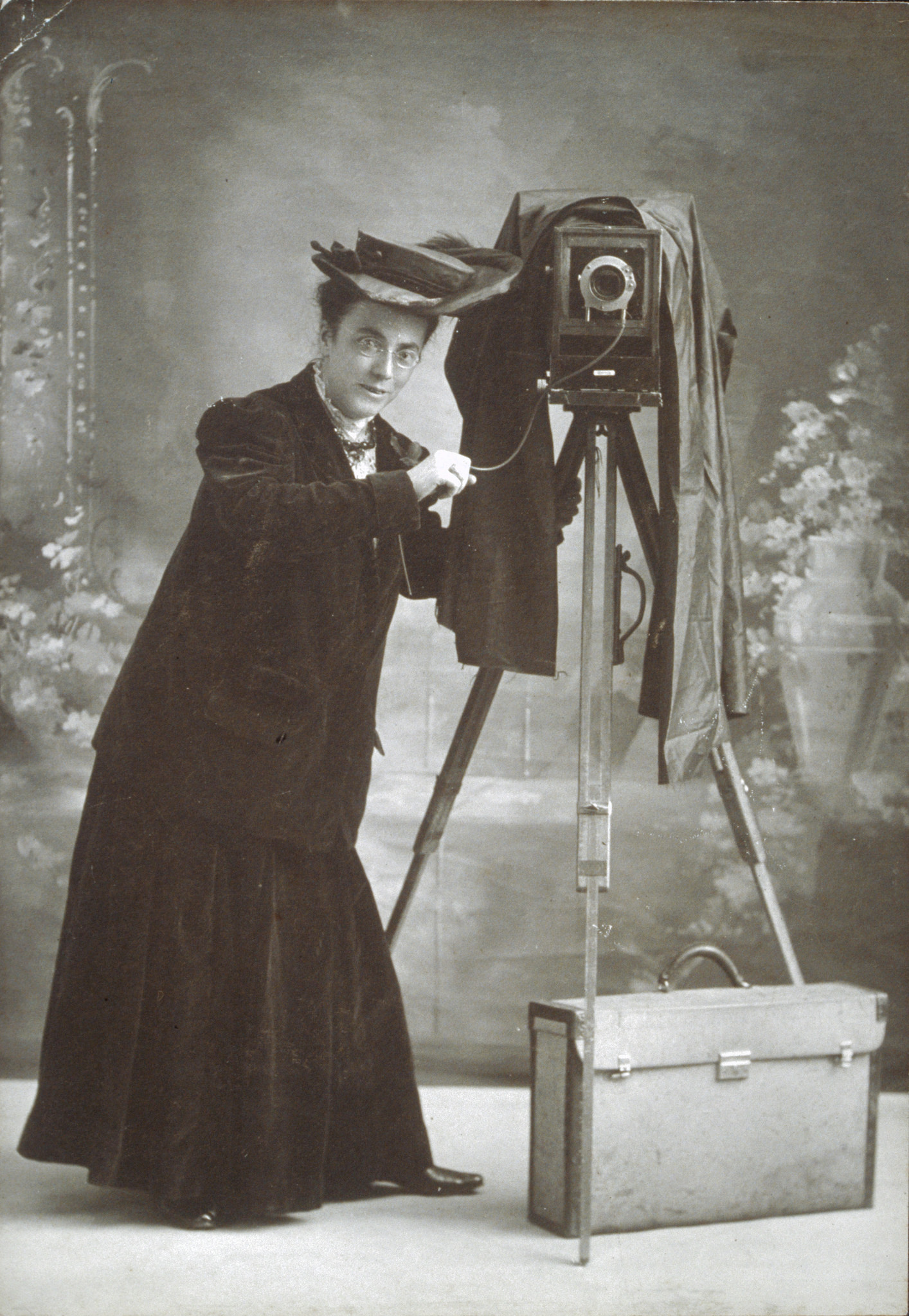
- Beals with her camera c. 1905.
- Born: Jessie Richmond Tarbox; December 23, 1870; Hamilton, Ontario, Canada
- Died: May 30, 1942 (aged 71); New York City
- Known for: Photography
- Spouse: Alfred Tennyson Beals (m. 1897)

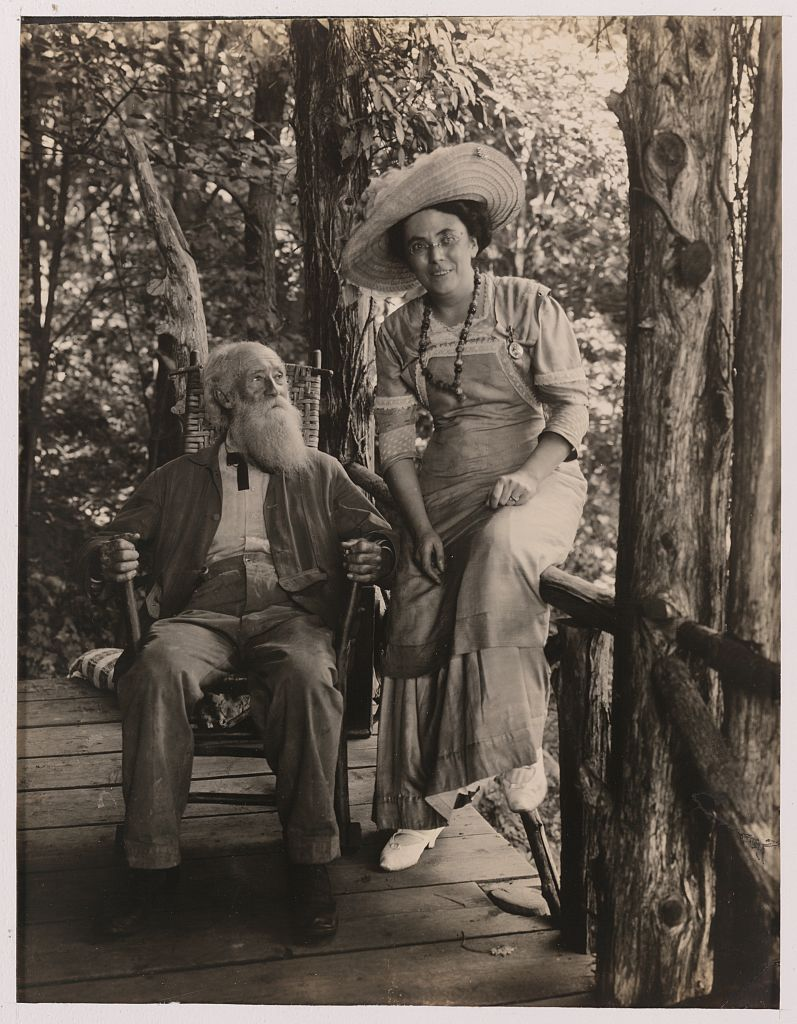
Jessie Tarbox Beals with John Burroughs, 1908

Jessie Tarbox Beals (December 23, 1870 – May 30, 1942) was an American photographer, the first published female photojournalist in the United States and the first female night photographer.

She is best known for her freelance news photographs, particularly of the 1904 St. Louis World's Fair, and portraits of places such as Bohemian Greenwich Village.

Her trademarks were her self-described "ability to hustle" and her tenacity in overcoming gender barriers in her profession.

== Early life and education ==
Beals was born Jessie Richmond Tarbox on December 23, 1870, in Hamilton, Ontario, the youngest child of John Nathaniel Tarbox and Marie Antoinette Bassett. John Tarbox was a sewing machine manufacturer, and his partnership with the largest sewing machine company in Canada made the Tarbox family wealthy. When Beals was seven, however, her father lost all of his savings in a bad investment and began drinking heavily. He eventually left home at the insistence of Beals's mother, who then embroidered and sold some of the family's belongings to keep the family income going.

Beals was a "bright and precocious child" and did well in school. At age fourteen she was admitted to the Collegiate Institute of Ontario, and at seventeen received her teaching certificate. Beals began teaching at a one-room schoolhouse in Williamsburg, Massachusetts, where her brother Paul was also living at the time. In 1888, Beals won a subscription prize camera through the Youth's Companion magazine. The camera was small and somewhat rudimentary, but Beals began to use it to take photographs of her students and their surroundings. Beals soon bought a higher quality Kodak camera and set up Williamsburg's first photography studio in front of her house, although photography largely remained her side hobby.

== Photography career ==
In 1893 Beals took a new teaching position in Greenfield, Massachusetts and visited the World's Columbian Exposition in Chicago. At the Exposition, Beals' interest in traveling and photography was sparked having met Frances Benjamin Johnston and Gertrude Käsebier.

In 1897, Beals married Alfred Tennyson Beals, an Amherst graduate and factory machinist.

In 1899, Beals received her first professional assignment when she was asked by The Boston Post to photograph the Massachusetts state prison. Beals taught Alfred the basics of photography and the couple set out to work as itinerant photographers in 1900, with Alfred as Beals's darkroom assistant. That year, Beals also received her first credit line for her photographs in a publication, the Windham County Reformer.

By 1901, the Beals' funds were depleted and they resettled in Buffalo, New York. Later that year, Beals was hired as a staff photographer by the Buffalo Inquirer and The Buffalo Courier, after impressing the editor with a photograph of ducks waddling in a row entitled "On to Albany." This position made her the first female photojournalist and was well-regarded by the papers and citizens of Buffalo and worked at the publications until 1904 when she left to take photos of the World's Fair.

Photojournalism was physically demanding, often risky work, but Beals could be seen carrying out assignments in her ankle-length dresses and large hats, with her 8-by-10-inch glass plate camera and 50 pounds of equipment in tow. During one assignment for the lurid murder trial of Edwin L. Burdick in Buffalo, Beals broke a rule that forbade photographs of the trial by climbing a tall bookcase to a window to snap a picture of the courtroom before she was detected.

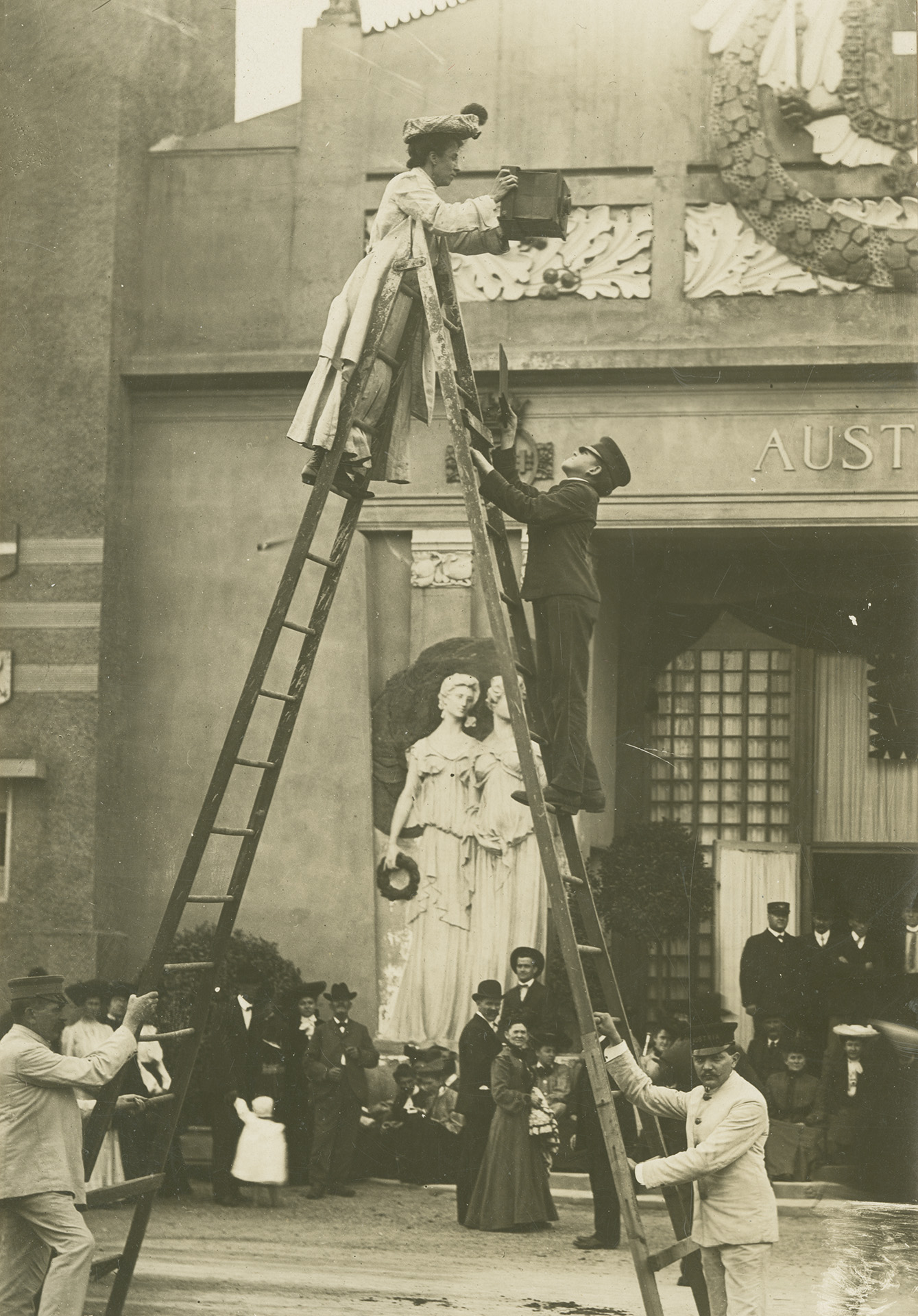
Jessie Tarbox Beals in front of the Austrian Government Building at the Louisiana Purchase Exhibition, 1904, gelatin silver print, Department of Image Collections, National Gallery of Art Library, Washington, DC.

In 1904, Beals was sent to the opening of the Louisiana Purchase Exposition in St. Louis, Missouri. There, Beals persuaded officials to give her a late press permit for the pre-exposition, climbed ladders and jumped into a hot air balloon just to get photographs that interested her. She was greatly interested in the Indigenous peoples which resulted in capturing many spontaneous images that did not necessarily fit into the predominant narrative of racial and developmental progress. She had a different style than most news photographers of the day, focusing on series of pictures that would later be used to write stories, rather than vice versa. Beals's display of her signature "hustle" earned her the position of official Fair photographer for the New York Herald, Leslie's Weekly and the Tribune, as well as the Fair's publicity department, producing over 3,500 photographs and 45,000 prints of the event.

In addition to photographing the various exhibits at the Fair, Beals also captured a candid photograph of President Theodore Roosevelt. This initial encounter earned her a special pass to photograph Roosevelt and the Rough Riders at their reunion in San Antonio, Texas in 1905.

=== A studio on Sixth Avenue ===
In 1905 Beals opened her own studio on Sixth Avenue in New York City. Beals continued to take on a variety of photograph assignments, ranging from shots of auto races and portraits of society figures, to her well-known photographs of Bohemian Greenwich Village and the New York slums. Over the years Beals also photographed several presidents and celebrities, including presidents Coolidge, Hoover and Taft; Mark Twain; Edna St. Vincent Millay; and Emily Post.

While Beals' career flourished, her marriage became troubled. In 1911, Beals gave birth to a daughter, Nanette Tarbox Beals, most likely from another relationship. Beals finally left her husband in 1917.

=== A studio and a gallery in Greenwich Village ===
She moved to Greenwich Village and opened a new photography studio and gallery in 1920. For a few years, Beals juggled working and caring for Nanette, who also suffered from rheumatoid arthritis and was frequently hospitalized, eventually deciding to send Nanette to camps and private boarding schools throughout the year. Nanette would later go on to live semi-permanently with one of Beals' old friends.

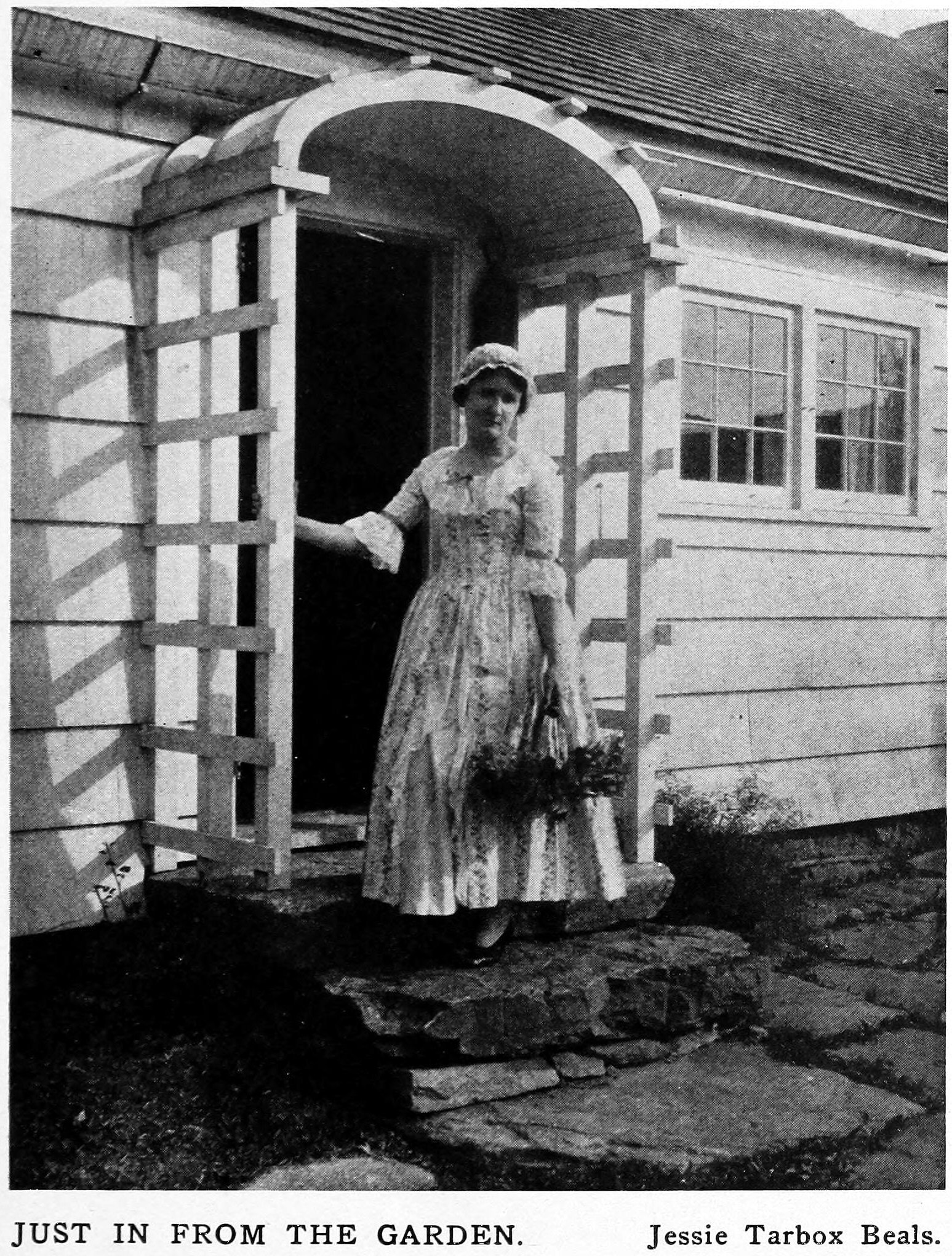
Just in from the Garden, Jessie Tarbox Beals (1922)

== Later years ==
As the number of female photographers increased during the 1920s, Beals shifted her focus to giving public talks and specializing in photographing suburban gardens and estates of wealthy East Coasters. By 1928, she and Nanette moved to California, where Beals photographed Hollywood estates. The Great Depression brought Beals and Nanette back to New York in 1933, where Beals lived and worked in Greenwich Village.

Despite being born in Canada, Beals declined to return later in life. Following the establishment of her Greenwich Village studio, Beals participated in just one Canadian exhibition, at the Toronto Camera Club International Photo Exhibition, 1921.

Beals gradually fell into poverty, and died on May 30, 1942, at Bellevue Hospital, at the age of seventy-one. Thanks to the rescue efforts of Alexander Alland, a contemporaneous photographer, her photographs and prints are in collections at the Library of Congress, Harvard University, the New-York Historical Society, and the American Museum of Natural History. In 1982, the Schlesinger Library at Radcliffe received Beals' papers and pictures from her daughter, Nanette Beals Brainerd.
