= Photographic Society of America =

Photography non-profit organization

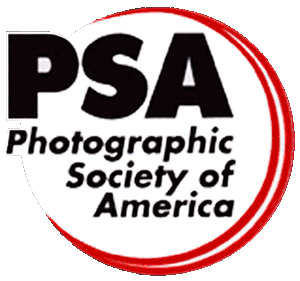
- Abbreviation: PSA
- Formation: 1934
- Type: Non-profit organization
- Purpose: Photography
- Headquarters: Oklahoma City, Oklahoma
- Region served: Worldwide
- President: John Andrew Hughes
- Staff: 4
- Volunteers: 500+
- Website: www.psaphotoworldwide.org

The Photographic Society of America (PSA) is a non-profit organization, established in 1934 and aimed at photographers. The PSA includes members in over 60 countries and holds several competitions throughout the year, including the PSA Youth Showcase.

== Presidents of PSA ==
Presidents of PSA since established until now
The President	since	until
John Andrew Hughes	2025	2029
JR Schnelzer	2020	2025
Elena McTighe	2017	2020
Charles Burke	2015	2017
John Davis Jr	2011	2015
Fred Greene	2007	2011
Richard M. Frieders	2003	2007
Albert L. Sieg	1999	2003
Pauline Sweezey Fredrickson	1995	1999
James H. Turnbull	1991	1995
Ralph E. Venk	1987	1991
Paul T. Luebke	1985	1986
Frank S. Pallo	1983	1985
Henry W. Greenhood	1979	1983
Arthur P. Henricks Jr	1975	1979
DeWitt Bishop	1971	1975
Joe E. Kennedy	1967	1971
Nester Barrett	1963	1967
Robert J. Goldman	1959	1963
Melvin M. Phegley	1955	1959
Norris Harkness	1951	1955
John G. Mulder	1949	1951
Charles B. Phelps Jr.	1945	1949
John S. Rowan	1941	1945
Frank Liuni	1937	1941
Max Thorek	1934	1937
