= Durant =

Durant may refer to:

== People ==
- Durant (surname)

=== Fictional characters ===
- Durant (Pokémon), a species in Pokémon Black and White
- John Durant (General Hospital), a character on the soap opera General Hospital

== Places ==
- Durant, Florida, USA
- Durant, Iowa, USA
- Durant, Mississippi, USA
- Durant, Polk County, Nebraska, USA
- Durant, Oklahoma, USA
- Durant, Texas, USA

=== Fictional places ===
- Durant, Absaroka County, Wyoming, USA; fictional setting of the Longmire television series and novels by author Craig Johnson
- Durant, Nebraska, USA; fictional setting for the eponymous episode of the TV show Hell on Wheels

== Education ==
- Durant Public School District, Durant, Mississippi, USA
- Durant Independent School District, Durant, Oklahoma, USA
- Durant (Iowa) Community School District, Cedar County, Iowa, USA
- Durant High School (Plant City, Florida) in Plant City, Florida
- Durant High School (Iowa) in Durant, Iowa
- Durant High School (Mississippi) in Durant, Mississippi
- Durant High School (Oklahoma) in Durant, Oklahoma

== Transportation ==
- Durant Motors, a car manufacturer
  - Durant (automobile), a marque of car produced by Durant
- SS Empire Durant, the Empire-ship Durant
- Durant Regional Airport–Eaker Field, Durant, Oklahoma, USA

== Facilities and structures ==
- The Durant, an apartment building and former hotel in Flint, Michigan, USA
- Hotel Durant, a boutique hotel in Berkeley, California, USA
- Capt. Edward Durant House (Durant House), a historic house in Newton Centre, Massachusetts, USA
- Durant House (St. Charles, Illinois), a historic U.S. house
- Durant Hall, an NRHP-registered building in California, USA; see National Register of Historic Places listings in Alameda County, California

== Other uses ==
- Durant (cloth), a woven textile

== See also ==
- Durand (disambiguation)
- Durant House (disambiguation)
- Durant High School (disambiguation)
- Durant School District (disambiguation)
- Durante, given name and surname
- Durants School, Enfield, London, England, UK
- Durants Neck, North Carolina, USA
- Durrant, surname
