= Durant High School =

Durant High School may refer to one of several high schools in the United States:

- Durant High School (Mississippi) in Durant, Mississippi, US
- Durant High School (Iowa) in Durant, Iowa, US
- Durant High School (Oklahoma) in Durant, Oklahoma, US
- Durant High School (Florida) in Plant City, Florida, US

== See also ==
- Durant (disambiguation)
- Durand (disambiguation)
- Durand High School (Illinois)
