= Durant House =

Durant House may refer to:

- Durant House (St. Charles, Illinois), listed on the National Register of Historic Places in Kane County, Illinois
- Capt. Edward Durant House, Newton, Massachusetts

== See also ==
- Durant Hall, Berkeley, California, listed on the National Register of Historic Places in Alameda County, California
- Durant (disambiguation)
- House (disambiguation)
