= Henry Durrant =

Henry Durrant may refer to:

- Henry William Durant (1902–1982), opinion pollster and market researcher
- Henry Durant (bishop) (1871–1932), Bishop of Lahore
- Henry Durrant, of the Durrant baronets

== See also ==
- Durrant (surname)
