= Thomas Durant =

Thomas Durant may refer to:

- Thomas C. Durant (1820–1885), American financier and railroad promoter
- Thomas Durant (15th-century politician) (fl. 1401–1406), MP for Bedfordshire (UK Parliament constituency)
- Thomas Durant (teller), Teller of the Receipt of the Exchequer, c. 1362–98

== See also ==
- Thomas Frank Durrant, VC (1918–1942), English soldier
- Sir Thomas Durrant, 1st Baronet (c. 1733–1790), English MP for St Ives, 1768–74
- Durant (disambiguation)
