= Tambov (disambiguation) =

Tambov is a city in Russia.

Tambov may also refer to:

- Tambov Oblast, a Russian province
- 4621 Tambov, a main-belt asteroid
- Tambov (air base), a Russian Air Force base
- SS Tambov, a Soviet merchant ship in service 1946-58
- Tambov Gang, an organized crime outfit based in St. Petersburg, Russia
