= Durant (surname) =

Durant is a surname of French and English origin. It ultimately derives from the Latin omen name Durandus, meaning "enduring". Notable people with the surname include:

- Adrian Durant (born 1984), sprint athlete from the U.S. Virgin Islands
- Albert Durant (1892–?), Belgian water polo player
- Ariel Durant (1898–1981), co-author of The Story of Civilization with husband Will Durant
- Cliff Durant (1890–1937), American racecar driver
- Cobie Durant (born 1998), American football player
- Darian Durant (born 1982), CFL football player
- Don Durant (1932–2005), American actor and singer
- George Durant (1632–1692), Attorney General from North Carolina
- Edward W. Durant (1829-1918), American politician from Minnesota
- Henry Durant (1802–1875), first president of the University of California
- Henry Bickersteth Durant (1871–1932), Bishop of Lahore (1913–32)
- Henry Fowle Durant (1822–1881), American lawyer and philanthropist
- Hugh Durant (1877–1916), British sport shooter
- Isabelle Durant (born 1954), Belgian politician
- Joanne Durant (born 1975), Barbadian track and field sprinter
- Joe Durant (born 1964), American professional golfer
- John Charles Durant (1846–1929), English printer and Liberal politician
- Justin Durant (born 1985), NFL football player
- Kenneth W. Durant (1919–1942), U.S. Navy sailor
- Kevin Durant (born 1988), American basketball player
- Louis Durant (1910–1972), American racecar driver
- Mataeo Durant (born 1999), American football player
- Michael Durant (born 1961), U.S. Army helicopter pilot held prisoner in Somalia in 1993
- Mike Durant (baseball) (born 1969), former American Major League baseball player
- Paul Durant (born 1959), former American racecar driver
- Peter Durant, American politician
- Sam Durant (born 1961), American artist
- Sophia Durant (c. 1752 – c. 1813/1831) Koasati Native American plantation owner and speaker, interpreter, and translator for her brother, Alexander McGillivray
- Susan Durant (1827–1873), British artist and sculptor
- Tara Durant (born 1972), American politician
- Thomas C. Durant (1820–1885), American financier
- Tony Durant (1928–2016), British politician
- Will Durant (1885–1981), American philosopher, historian and author, husband of Ariel Durant
- William A. Durant (1866–1948), American politician
- William C. Durant (1861–1947), pioneer of U.S. automobile industry
- William West Durant (1850–1934), American architect and designer
- Yasir Durant (born 1997), American football player
- Zane Durant (born 2004), American football player

== See also ==
- Durrant, surname
- Durante, given name and surname
- Durand (surname)
