= William Durant =

William Durant may refer to:

- Will Durant (1885–1981), historian and philosopher
- William C. Durant (1861–1947), industrialist and founder of General Motors Corporation
- William West Durant (1850–1934), architect and developer of camps in the Adirondack Great Camp style
- William A. Durant (1866–1948), American politician in Oklahoma

== See also ==
- Guillaume Durand (disambiguation)
