= East Parish Burying Ground =

Historic cemetery in Massachusetts, United States

Coordinates: 42°20′32.39″N 71°11′29.93″W

- U.S. National Register of Historic Places
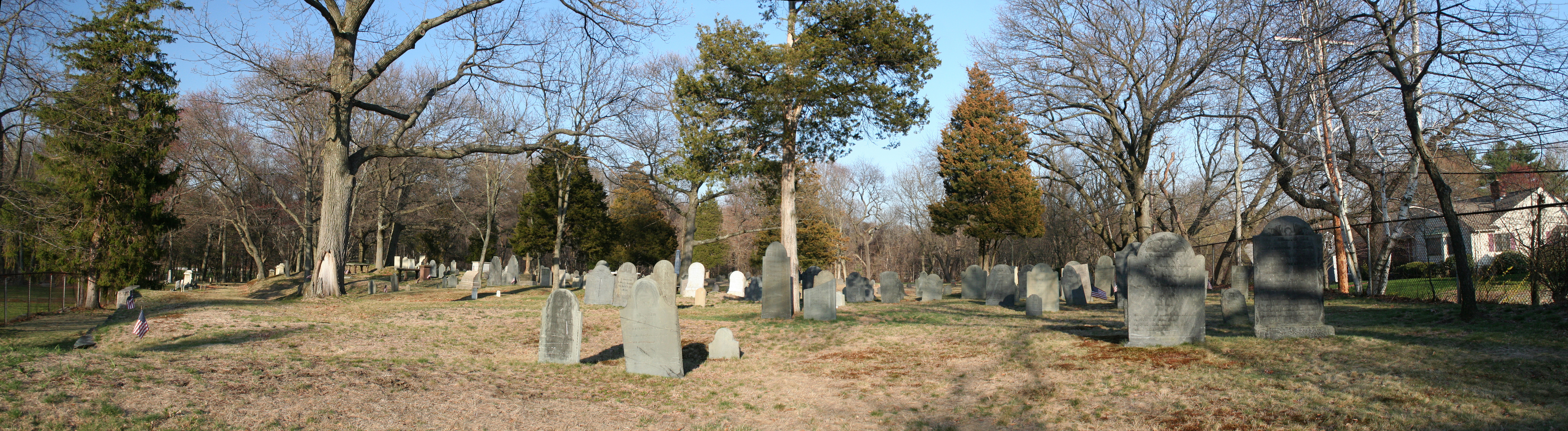
- Location: Centre Street, Newton Corner, Massachusetts
- Area: 2.9 acres (1.2 ha)
- Built: 1660s
- NRHP reference No.: 83004010
- Added to NRHP: December 23, 1983

East Parish Burying Ground, also known as Centre Street Burying Ground or Centre Street Cemetery, is a historic cemetery at Centre and Cotton streets in the village of Newton Corner, Massachusetts. It was listed on the National Register of Historic Places in 1983, and has been called the "most important, the most evocative and also the most fragile historic site in the city."

== History ==
East Parish Cemetery dates from the 1660s, when the term "parish" had both a political and religious connotation. The East Parish Church was also known as the First Church in Newton, organized in 1664, but was dissolved in 1973 after failed attempts to merge with its two offspring churches, Second Church in Newton (West Parish) and Eliot Church. First Church's last church building at 1115 Centre Street in Newton Centre is now the Greek Evangelical Church of Boston.

=== First Settlers Monument ===
The First Settlers Monument was erected September 1, 1852, to commemorate the first settlers of East Parish and has inscriptions on its four sides as follows:

- The north side inscription recounts that the first acre was given by Deacon John Jackson for the burial place and First Church, while his son Abraham Jackson gave the 2 acres (8,100 m^{2}) that form the old part of the cemetery. Edward Jackson gave 20 acres (81,000 m^{2}) in 1660 and another 31 acres (130,000 m^{2}) in 1681.
- The west side inscription lists twenty early settlers with the year each settled in Newton as well as the year of death. The earliest year of settlement is 1640 and the latest is 1664.
- The south side inscription commemorates Thomas Wiswall, who was ordained ruling elder on July 20, 1664, and his four sons.
- The east side inscription commemorates the Reverend John Eliot Jr., first pastor of First Church in Newton, who was ordained July 20, 1664. It states also that his widow remarried, that his only daughter married, and that his only son went to Windsor, Connecticut, and died leaving a son.

== Location ==
East Parish Burying Ground fronts on Centre Street on the west and on Cotton Street on the south, but the actual corner of those two streets is occupied by city-owned Loring Park, a long, narrow tract of 13,200 square feet (1,230 m^{2}), whose longest side fronts on Centre Street. East Parish Burying Ground is bordered on the north and east by lands of the Centre Street congregation of the Missionary Franciscan Sisters of the Immaculate Conception. Cotton Street is the approximate boundary between Newton Corner to the north and Newton Centre to the south.

== Current status ==
East Parish Burying Ground is owned today by the City of Newton, which lists it as "Centre Street Cemetery" with an area of 125,620 square feet (11,670 m^{2}). Historic Newton manages the preservation of the graves and tombs of Newton's City-owned historic burying grounds.

== See also ==
- National Register of Historic Places listings in Newton, Massachusetts
- West Parish Burying Ground
- Jackson Homestead
- Capt. Edward Durant House
