= Henry's Pub hostage incident =

1990 hostage crisis in Berkeley, California

1990 Henry's Pub hostage crisis
- Location: Henry's Pub, Hotel Durant, Berkeley, California, U.S.
- Date: September 28, 1990; 36 years ago 12:05 a.m. – 7:30 a.m.
- Attack type: Hostage-taking, siege, mass shooting
- Weapons: Three pistols: MAC-10 (9mm); Ruger P89 (9mm); Smith & Wesson Model 29 (.44 Magnum)
- Deaths: 2 (including the perpetrator)
- Injuries: 7
- Perpetrator: Mehrdad Dashti
- Motive: Schizophrenic delusions

The Henry's Pub hostage incident was a hostage crisis that occurred on September 28, 1990, at Henry's Pub inside the Hotel Durant in Berkeley, California, United States.

Mehrdad Dashti, who had schizophrenia, held 33 hostages for seven hours, terrorizing them and sexually degrading some of them. Dashti and a hostage were killed when police entered the premises.

== Incident ==
At about 12:30 am, Iranian-born 29-year-old Mehrdad Dashti brought three guns and 445 rounds of ammunition and held 33 hostages for seven hours in the bar near the University of California, Berkeley. During the incident the hostage-taker issued irrational, delusional demands to the police officers, such as asking for trillions of dollars from the federal government in exchange for telepathy services, demanding to be given the state of Alaska, and insisting that San Francisco Police Chief Frank Jordan and former Central Intelligence Agency director Richard Helms make a statement, appear on television and drop their pants. He ordered some blonde female students to undress below the waist and spoke sexually demeaning language to them. He also told his hostages to drink up because "If you're all going to die, you might as well be having fun."

By 7 am, police negotiators had unsuccessfully tried to disarm Dashti and decided to move in. In the siege a student was killed, John N. Sheehy (22), shot in the chest at close range, and six other students and one police officer were wounded by gunfire. Dashti jumped up and fired two shots at the kitchen door, and the gunman was shot and killed with a hail of 24 bullets to his head and chest.

A student who was there to see it said that they "pumped him full of holes,"
