= SS Dalewood =

Two ships operated by W France, Fenwick & Co Ltd were named Dalewood:

- SS Dalewood (1911), torpedoed and sunk by SM U-105 on 26 February 1918.
- SS Dalewood (1921), sold to Germany in 1923.
