= Durand (given name) =

The given name Durand may refer to:

- Durand de Bredons (died 1071), French Benedictine and bishop of Toulouse
- Durand of Gloucester (fl.1086), Sheriff of Gloucestershire in 1086
- Durand of Huesca (died 1224), Catholic theologian
- Durand or Durandus of Saint-Pourçain (1275–1332), French philosopher and theologian
- Durand Rudy Macklin (born 1958), American retired basketball player
- Durand Scott (born 1990), American basketball player
- Durand Soraine (born 1983), Indian-born Canadian cricket player
- Durand Durand, a character in Barbarella
- Durand Echeverria (1913–2001), American historian
- Durand W. Springer (1866–1943), American football coach and accountant

== See also ==
- Durand (disambiguation)
