= West Parish Burying Ground =

Historic cemetery in Massachusetts, United States

Coordinates: 42°21′8.20″N 71°13′46.16″W

- U.S. National Register of Historic Places
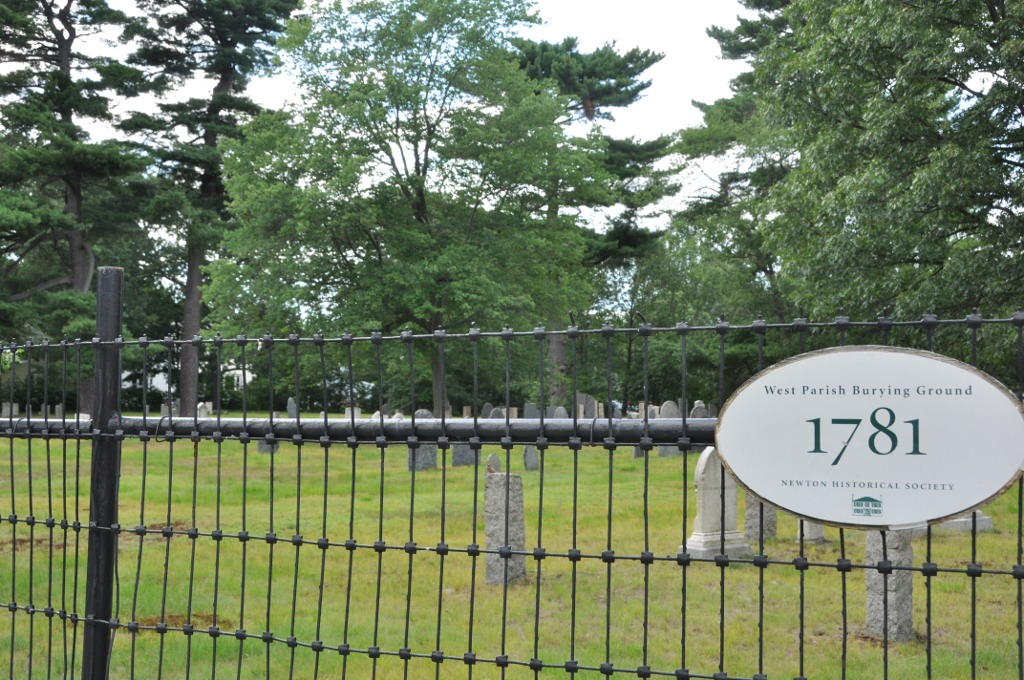
- Location: River and Cherry street, West Newton, Massachusetts
- Area: 1.6 acres (0.65 ha)
- NRHP reference No.: 04001221
- Added to NRHP: December 13, 2004

The West Parish Burying Ground, also known as the River Street Burying Ground or River Street Cemetery, is a cemetery located at River and Cherry streets in West Newton, Massachusetts, and is listed on the National Register of Historic Places. Established in 1777, the cemetery is owned and maintained by the City of Newton; the Second Church in Newton, its original owner, was known as the West Parish.

== Description and history ==
The cemetery occupies a roughly rectangular plot about 1.6 acres (0.65 ha) in size at the northwest corner of River and Cherry Streets, just north of the village center of West Newton. The street sides of the property are bounded by a low fieldstone wall, which is topped by a distinctive wrought iron cross-link fence. The entrance, on River Street, is marked by dressed granite posts, and is secured by a chain-link gate. There is no paved interior circulation lane, but a rectilinear grid of pathways is discernible in the landscape. The cemetery is divided into a combination of family plots and single plots, with headstones generally oriented facing west. When surveyed in 2004, there were 170 grave markers, down from about 200 at the turn of the 20th century.

Newton was first settled in 1660, was incorporated as a town in 1688, and as a city in 1873. Its first parish meetinghouse, with accompanying East Parish Burying Ground, were located in what is now Newton Corner. By the mid-18th century the population in western Newton had grown to the point of meriting a separate parish. The Second Church in Newton was established in 1778, and this burying ground was formally established in 1781. Its earliest burials, however, took place in 1777, with at least five members of the Fuller family, who gave the land, interred there. The Fuller family is buried in one of several tomb mounds that dot the landscape. Use of the cemetery declined significantly after the large Newton Cemetery was established in 1855 (in the then-popular rural cemetery style), and its last recorded burial was in 1891. The cemetery was transferred from the parish to the city in the 1880s. The city made a detailed record of the cemetery, including its burials, layout, and landscaping, in 1901.

The cemetery is owned today by the City of Newton. Historic Newton manages the preservation of the graves and tombs of Newton's City-owned historic burying grounds. The burying grounds are not open to the public.

== Notable grave sites ==
- Rev. William Greenough, died November 10, 1831, first pastor of the Second Church in Newton.

== See also ==
- National Register of Historic Places listings in Newton, Massachusetts
- East Parish Burying Ground
