= Durant School District =

Durant School District may refer to:

- Durant Public School District, Durant, Mississippi, USA
- Durant Independent School District, Durant, Oklahoma, USA
- Durant Community School District, Cedar County, Iowa, USA
