= Troy Price =

American political consultant & activist (born 1980/81)

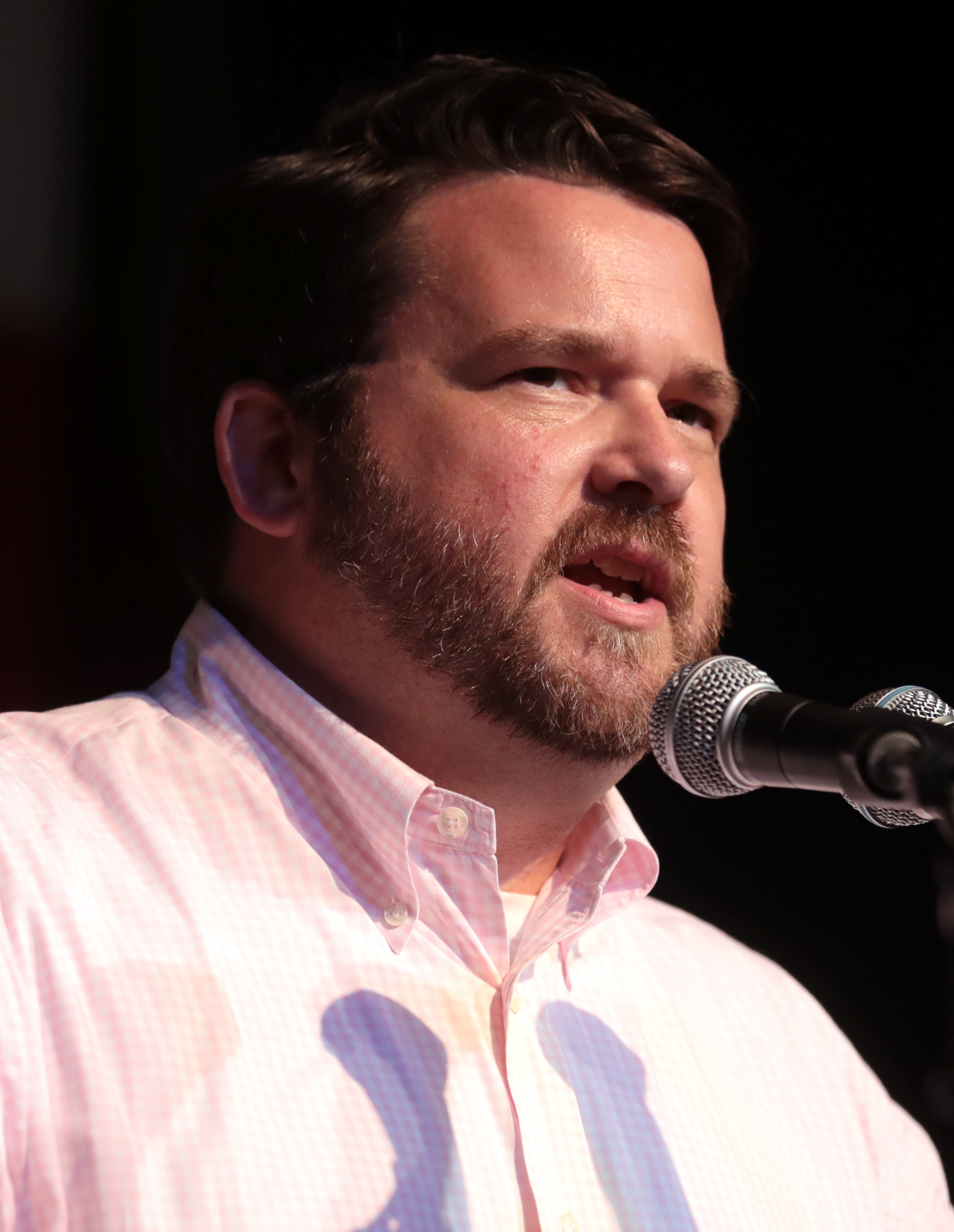

Executive Director of the New Hampshire Democratic Party
- In office August 16, 2021 – 2023
- Preceded by: Ryan Mahoney

Chair of the Iowa Democratic Party
- In office July 22, 2017 – February 15, 2020
- Preceded by: Andrea Phillips (acting)
- Succeeded by: Mark Smith

Personal details
- Born: Troy Michael Price; 1980 or 1981 (age 45–46)
- Party: Democratic
- Education: Durant High School; University of Iowa (BA)

Troy Price is an American political strategist and LGBTQ rights advocate who served as the chair of the Iowa Democratic Party from his election in July 2017 until his resignation in February 2020. Price worked in the administration of Iowa Governor Chet Culver, and later served as a press aide for Tom Vilsack. Price served as Iowa Director for the Barack Obama 2012 presidential campaign and the Hillary Clinton 2016 presidential campaign.

== Early life and education ==
Price was raised in Durant, Iowa, where he attended Durant High School. He then graduated from the University of Iowa with a Bachelor of Arts in Political Science and Government in 2004. After graduating from college, Price became active in the Iowa caucus process.

Price is gay.

== Career ==
Price was the executive director of One Iowa, an LGBTQ advocacy organization, before stepping down to work on the Barack Obama 2012 presidential campaign. He was a proponent of marriage equality in Iowa. In October 2018, Price was re-elected Chair of the Iowa Democratic Party. During his tenure as chair, Price appeared on NPR and C-SPAN. Price was selected as a "key player of the 2020 Iowa Democratic caucuses" by The Des Moines Register, and has been featured in The New York Times, Politico, and NBC News.

On February 12, 2020, Troy Price announced his resignation as chairman of the Iowa Democratic Party, following the controversy over the delay in the final results of the 2020 Iowa Democratic caucuses. This delay is reported to be a factor in the Democratic National Committee voting to remove Iowa's First in the Nation status for the 2024 presidential nominating calendar. Price officially left office after Mark Smith, a current member of the Iowa House of Representatives, was selected as his successor by the Iowa Democratic Party. On August 16, 2021, Price began working as executive director of the New Hampshire Democratic Party. In 2023, the Democratic National Committee voted to remove New Hampshire's early-state status for the 2024 presidential nominating calendar. Price was replaced by New Hampshire Democratic Party Data Director Jack Tormoehlen in 2023.

Party political offices
Preceded by Andrea Phillips; Acting	Chair of the Iowa Democratic Party; 2017–2020	Succeeded by Mark Smith
