= Capt. Edward Durant House =

Historic house in Massachusetts, United States

- Durant-Kenrick House and Grounds
- U.S. National Register of Historic Places
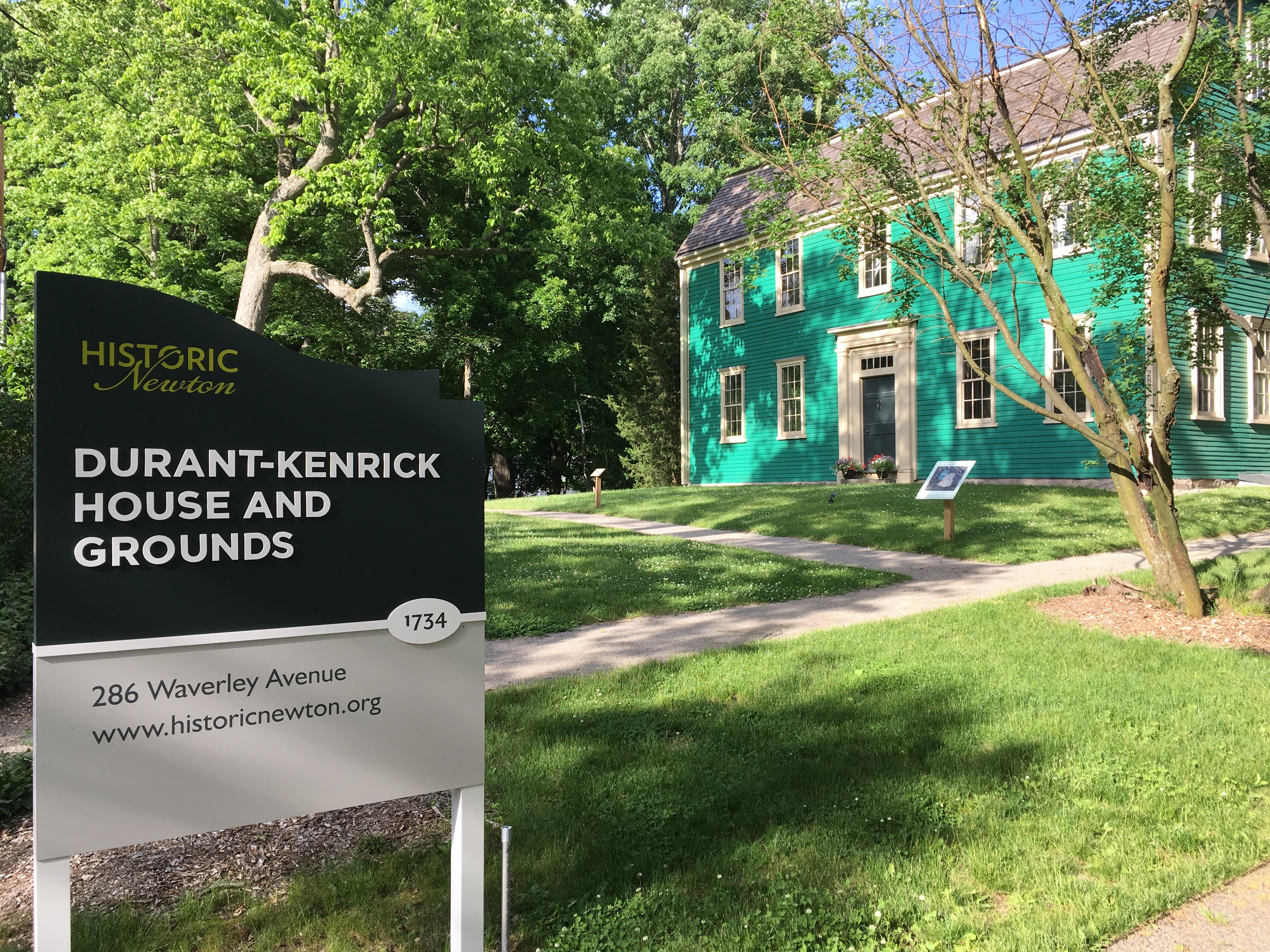

- Location within Massachusetts Location within the United States
- Location: 286 Waverley Avenue, Newton Corner, Massachusetts
- Coordinates: 42°20′46″N 71°10′52″W
- Area: (Bldg.)4,164 sq ft.; (land) 26,354 sq ft.
- Built: 1734
- NRHP reference No.: 76000267
- Added to NRHP: June 13, 1976

The Durant-Kenrick House and Grounds is a historic late First Period house at 286 Waverley Avenue in Newton Centre, Massachusetts, that is now a historic house museum.

== History ==
In 1732, Edward Durant II purchased 91 acres of land in Newton, Massachusetts and built a country house which was completed in 1734. In 1740, Edward Durant II died, leaving the property for his son, Edward Durant III, to inherit. Edward Durant III was a prominent member of the local community and played a key role in Newton during the events leading up to the American Revolution.

In 1790, John Kenrick Esq. purchased the property, adding to his significant landholdings in Newton. Upon his father's death, John A. Kenrick inherited the former Durant property in 1833. Along with his brother, William, John A. Kenrick started the Kenrick Nursery, one of the largest plant nurseries in New England at the time. The Kenrick Nursery encompassed much of the surrounding area, including Farlow Hill and the land that is now the Newton Commonwealth Golf Course. From the 1840s up until 1900, the Kenricks were involved with many land transactions, sometimes acquiring new property but increasingly selling off their large estate.

Around 1900, Austin Holden purchased the remaining .6 acres of land and began to restore the house. In 1912, F. Clarke Durant, a descendant of the original builders, purchased the land. Eleven years later, Arthur Stone Dewing, also a Durant descendant, purchased the land and house in 1923. Dewing was a businessman and a Harvard professor with a passion for historic preservation. Arthur, his wife Frances, and their three daughters would spend their summers at the Durant-Kenrick property while maintaining a permanent residence in nearby Cambridge, Massachusetts during the rest of the year.

== Current status ==
In 1985, Arthur Dewing's children established the Durant Homestead Foundation and opened the house to the public. In 2011 Historic Newton/ The Newton Historical Society received the house and property and undertook an extensive restoration and reinterpretation of the property. Finally, in January 2014, Durant-Kenrick House and Grounds opened to the public, offering an interactive museum depicting the history of three families that lived and worked on this property for a period of three hundred years.

The house was listed in the National Register of Historic Places on June 13, 1976.

== See also ==
- Jackson Homestead
- East Parish Burying Ground
- West Parish Burying Ground
- National Register of Historic Places listings in Newton, Massachusetts
