= Guillaume Durand (disambiguation) =

Guillaume Durand may refer to:

- Guillaume Durand (c. 1230–1296), French canonist and liturgical writer, and Bishop of Mende
- Guillaume Durand (journalist) (born 1952), French journalist
- Guillaume Durand (nephew) (died 1328 or 1330), French clergyman

== See also ==
- Durand (surname)
