= Durrant =

Durrant is a surname. Notable people with the surname include:

- Andi Durrant (born 1981), English radio presenter, DJ and music producer
- Devin Durrant (born 1960), American retired basketball player
- Frederick Thomas Durrant (1895–c1979), English organist and composer
- Glen Durrant (born 1970), English darts player
- Ian Durrant (born 1966), Scottish former footballer
- Theodore Durrant (1871–1898), Canadian-American convicted and executed for two murders
- Durrant baronets

== See also ==
- Durand
- Durant (disambiguation)
