= Robert E. Lee School (Durant, Oklahoma) =

- U.S. National Register of Historic Places
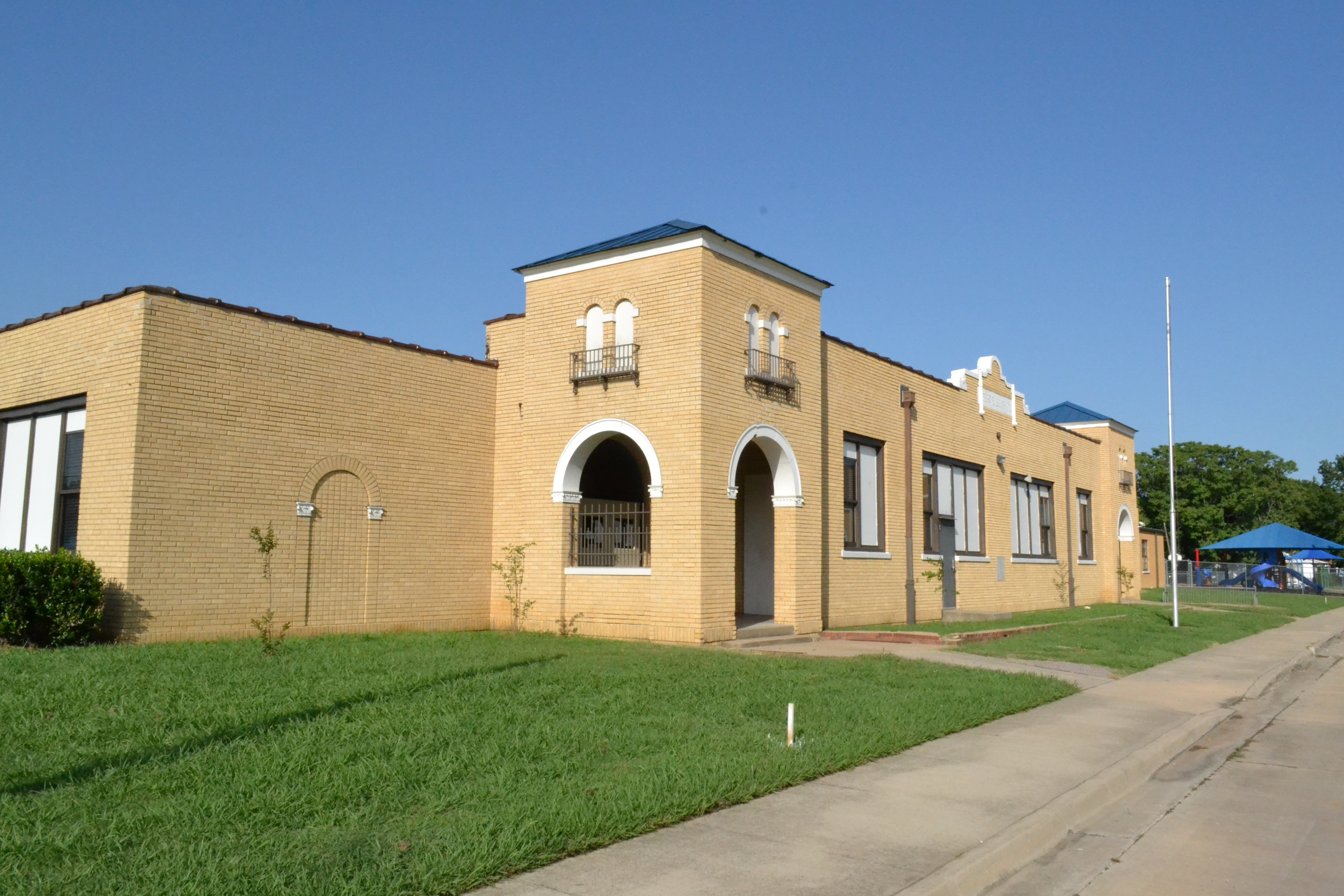

- Location within Oklahoma Location within the United States
- Location: Ninth and Louisiana Sts., Durant, Oklahoma
- Coordinates: 33°59′22″N 96°23′09″W
- Area: less than one acre
- Built: 1937
- Built by: Works Progress Administration
- Architect: Albert S. Ross
- Architectural style: Late 19th and 20th Century Revivals, Spanish Colonial
- MPS: WPA Public Bldgs., Recreational Facilities and Cemetery Improvements in Southeastern Oklahoma, 1935-1943 TR
- NRHP reference No.: 88001374
- Added to NRHP: September 8, 1988

The Robert E. Lee School, at Ninth and Louisiana Streets in Durant, Oklahoma, was built in 1937. It was listed on the National Register of Historic Places in 1988.

It is part of the Durant Independent School District.

It is a one-story L-shaped building, 189 by 114 feet (58 m × 35 m) in plan, with a buff brick exterior, with brick laid in running bond. It has a flat roof with parapets and towers capped by Spanish tile roofs. It was built as a Works Progress Administration project.

According to its National Register nomination, "The school building is significant because construction of it enabled destitute laborers in the Durant area to find useful employment after months, if not years, of unemployment. Also the structure created an educational environment more conducive to learning. As a WPA school building, the structure is notable for its stylistic allusion to Spanish colonial architecture and its use of brick building materials. It also suggests the relative "prosperity" of urban school districts as opposed to those in rural areas. Within the community the building is unique architecturally because of its style and workmanship."

Albert S. Ross is credited as architect of the project.
