= Moissac Abbey =

Abbey in Tarn-et-Garonne, France

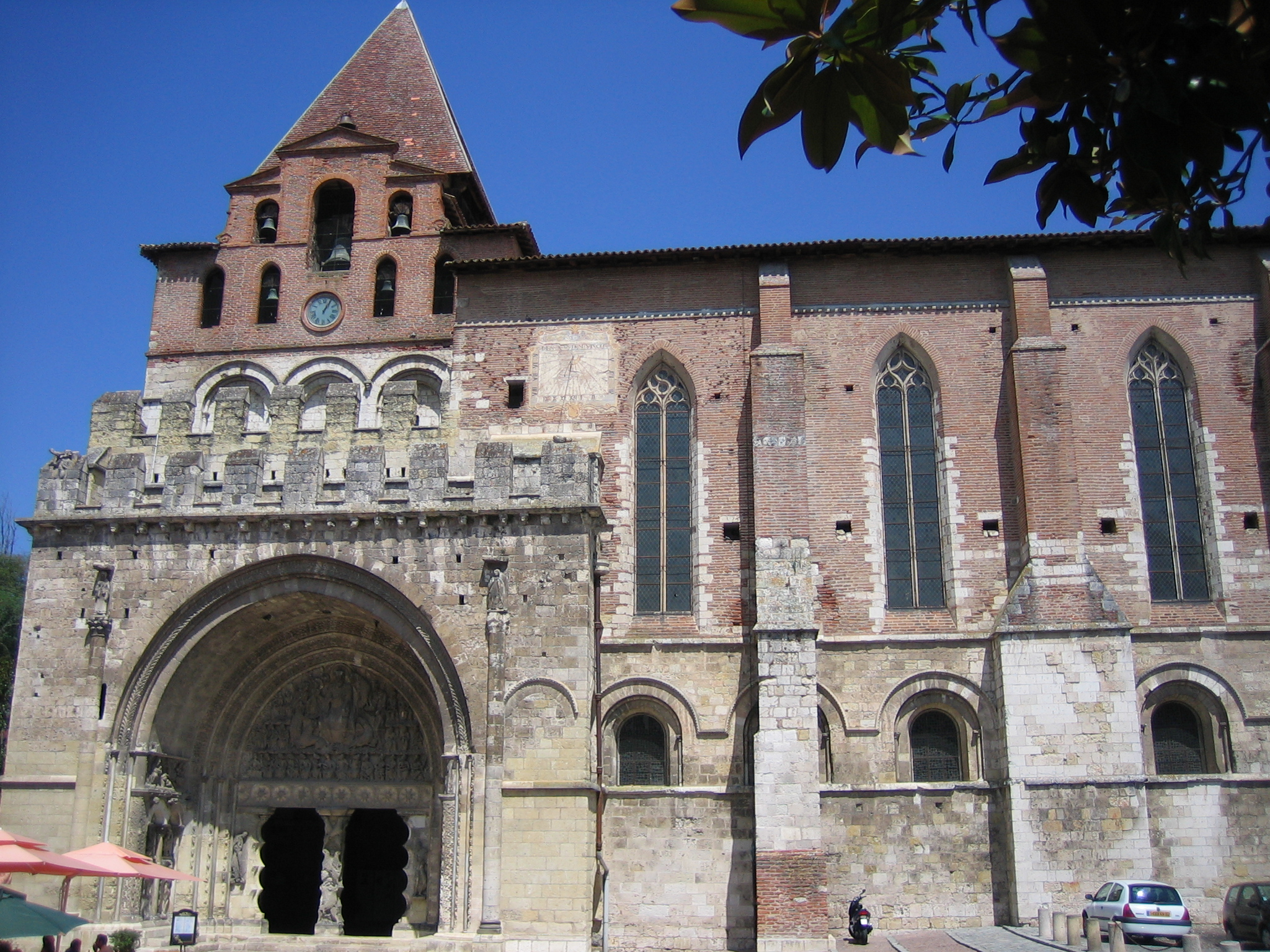
- The Romanesque south door of the abbey church
- Interactive map of Moissac Abbey

Monastery information
- Other name: Abbaye Saint-Pierre de Moissac
- Order: Benedictine
- Dedication: Saint Peter

People
- Founder: Clovis I

Architecture
- Style: Gothic architecture Romanesque architecture

Site
- Location: Moissac, Tarn-et-Garonne
- Country: France
- Coordinates: 44°6′20″N 1°5′5″E

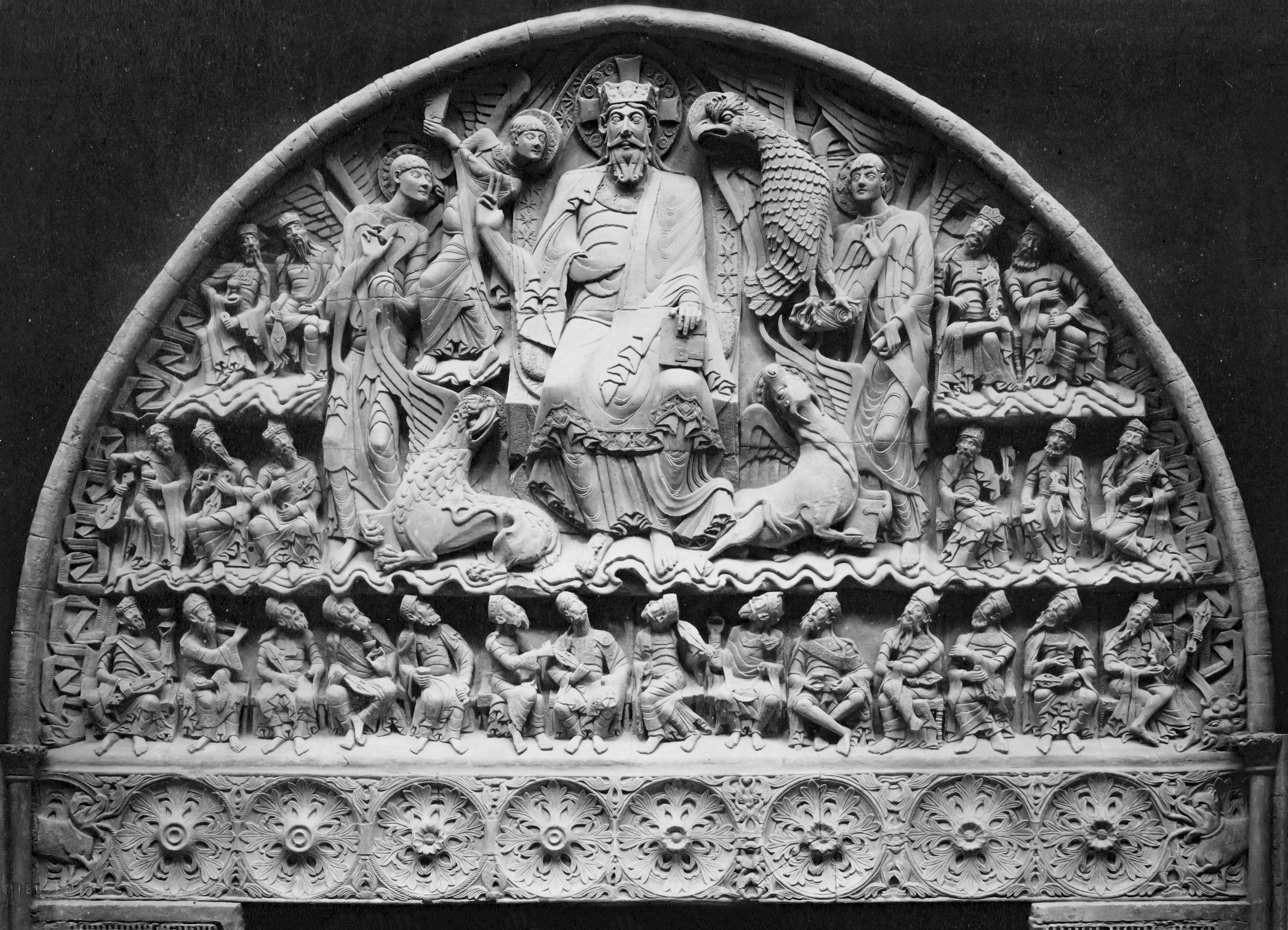
The tympanum of the south-west portico

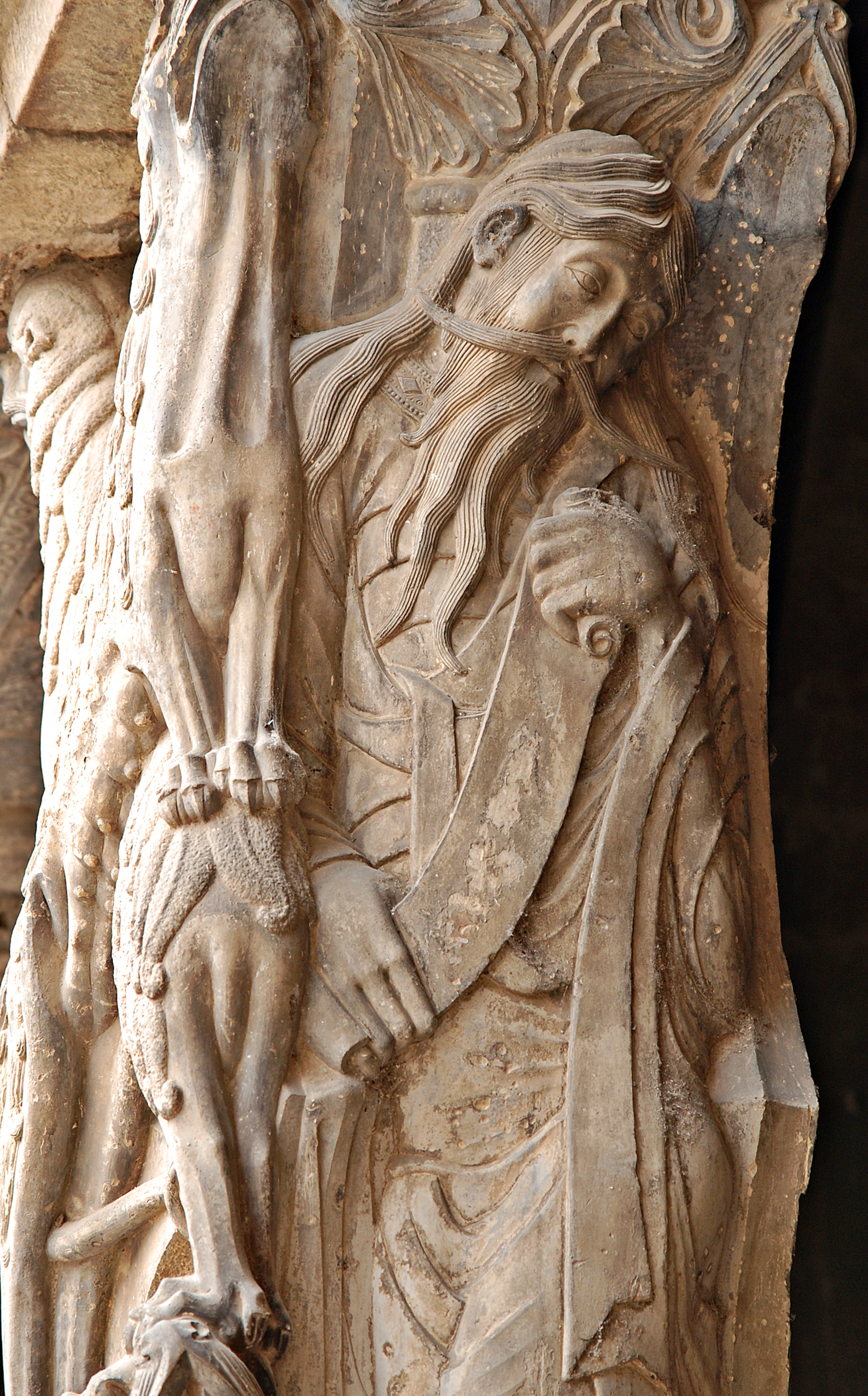
The prophet Jeremiah on the southern portal

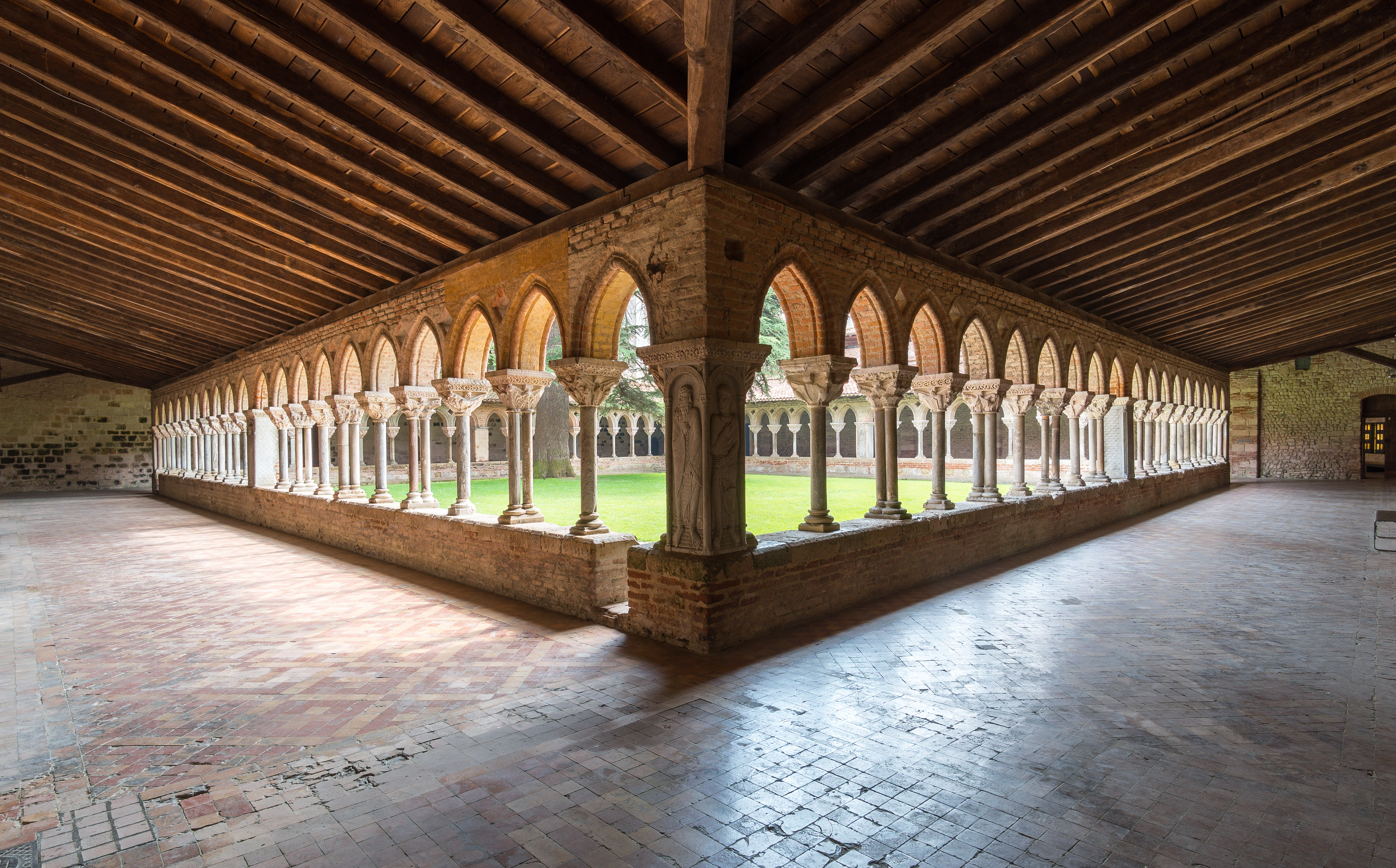
Cloisters of Moissac Abbey

Moissac Abbey was a Benedictine and Cluniac monastery in Moissac, Tarn-et-Garonne in south-western France. A number of its medieval buildings survive, including the abbey church, which has a famous and important Romanesque sculpture around the entrance.

== History ==
=== Foundation ===
According to legend, Moissac Abbey was founded by the Frankish king Clovis, in person the day after a victory over the Visigoths, in 506. The legend states that Clovis had made a vow to erect a monastery with 1,000 monks (in memory of a thousand of his warriors who died in battle) if he triumphed over the Visigoths who had ruled the area for the past century as federati of the Roman Empire. He threw his javelin from the top of the hill to mark the spot where "abbey of a thousand monks" was to be built. Unfortunately, the javelin landed in the middle of a swamp.

Historical records however indicate that it was founded by Saint Didier, bishop of Cahors, in the middle of the 7th century.

The establishment of the monastery was difficult because of raids by Moors from the south and west and the Norsemen from the north. The abbey was sacked by the Arabs of al-Andalus twice around 732 and was looted in the 9th century by Norman pirates and in the 10th century by Hungarians.

=== 11th century ===
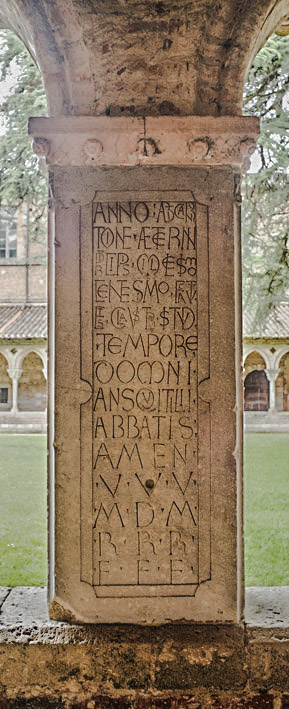
Consecration stone of the cloister

The 11th century was a dramatic time for the abbey. In 1030, the roof collapsed from lack of maintenance, and in 1042, there was a serious fire. Durand de Bredons, bishop of Toulouse, appointed the abbot of Cluny Odilon de Mercœur to bring in a sweeping reform to counter the laxity of the monks in 1047.

A new church building was added in 1063 along with significant restoration works. Pope Urban II visited in 1097 and consecrated the high altar and issued a Papal Bull dated 7 May 1097 restoring 40 churches to the abbey; he also ordered the construction of the cloister, completed in 1100.

=== 12th century ===
The 11th and 12th centuries were the first golden age, as Moissac was affiliated to the abbey of Cluny and accepted the Cluniac Reforms, under the guidance of Durand de Bredons, both the abbot of Moissac and the bishop of Toulouse. Papal support, its location on the pilgrim road, the restoration of the buildings and the reforms of de Bredon made the abbey one of the most powerful in France. In the 12th century, the abbot of Moissac was second in seniority within the Cluniac hierarchy only to the abbot of Cluny himself.

During this era, the abbey was led by major abbots Dom Hunaud de Gavarret and Dom Ansquitil, who had the doorway and tympanum built. In the 13th century, Raymond de Montpezat, followed by Bertrand de Montaigut, abbots and builders, ruled the abbey. Aymeric de Peyrac, writing his Chronicle in the 15th century in the château of Saint-Nicolas-de-la-Grave, describes these times.

Illuminated manuscripts produced in the monastery's scriptorium were taken to Paris by Jean-Baptiste Colbert in the 17th century and are now in the Bibliothèque Nationale.

=== 15th century ===
The 15th century ushered in a new golden age under the rule of abbots Pierre and Antoine de Caraman, whose building programme included in particular the Gothic part of the abbey church. The 1626 secularization of the abbey caused the Benedictine monks to leave the cloister, which had been a centre of Benedictine life for nearly 1,000 years. They were replaced by Augustinian canons, under commendatory abbots including well-known cardinals such as Mazarin and de Brienne.

=== French Revolution ===
In 1793, the French Revolution put an end to monastic life in Moissac. The abbey church of St Pierre is relatively intact and is still an active church, but the outlying buildings have suffered considerably. In the middle of the 19th century, the laying of a railway track threatened the cloister, but it was saved (though the refectory was demolished to facilitate the railway cutting) and listed as a historic monument. Since 1998, the church and cloisters have had international protection as part of a World Heritage Site, "Routes of Santiago de Compostela in France".

== Architecture ==
Architectural features of interest include the church's south-west portico, a crenellated structure with sculpture that is a major masterpiece of Romanesque art. This reflected an expansion of image carving both in scope and size and extended the use of sculpture from the sanctuary to the public exterior.

The tympanum depicts the Apocalypse of the Book of Revelation. Supporting the tympanum, a trumeau features a statue of the Prophet Isaiah, an outstanding example of Romanesque sculpture, comparable to the work at Santo Domingo de Silos. The cloisters also feature Romanesque sculpture.

== See also ==
- French Romanesque architecture
