= Durant, Iowa =

- City
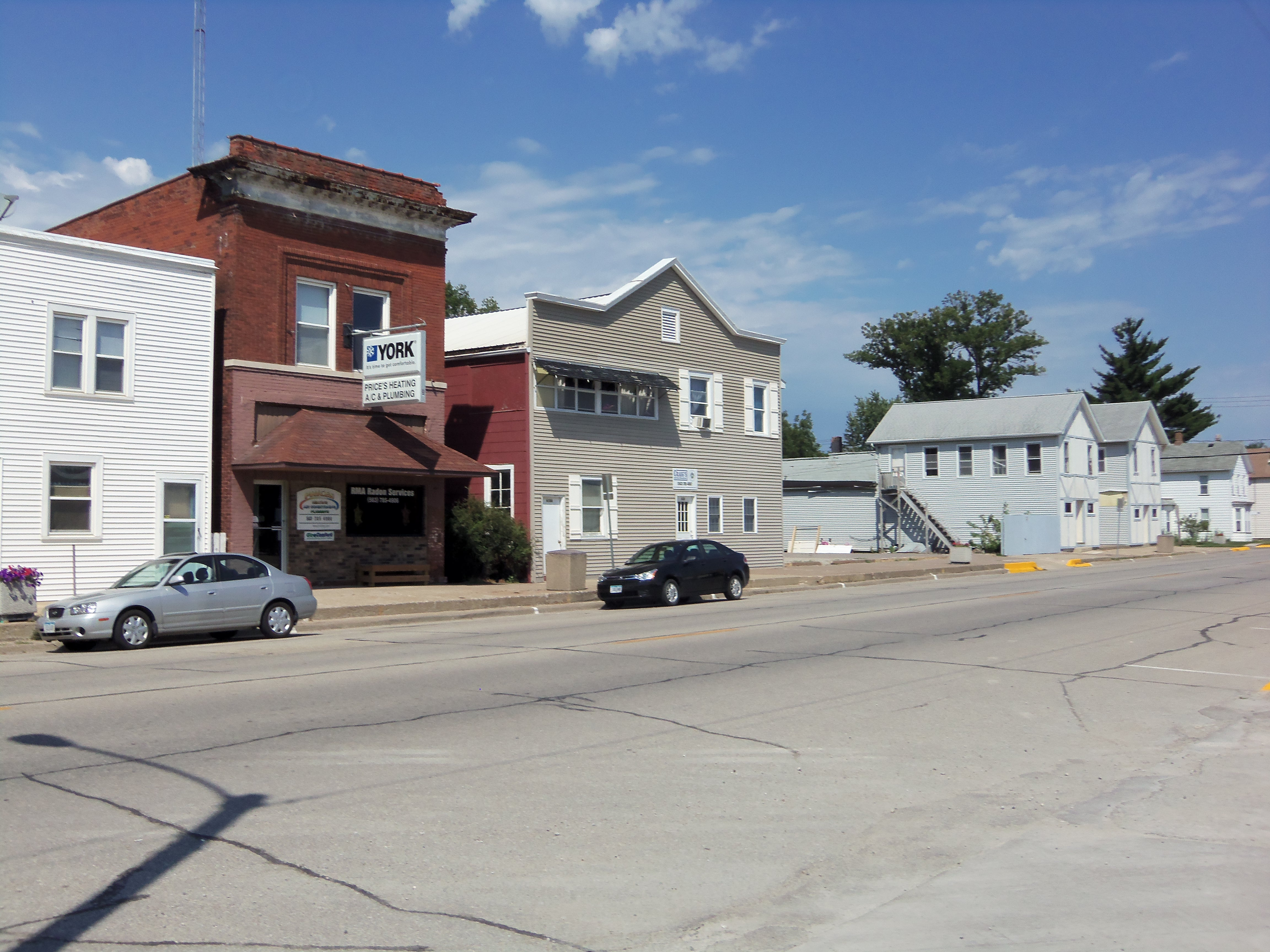
- Buildings on the north side of Fifth Street
- Nickname: Tri-County City
- Location of Durant, Iowa
- Coordinates: 41°36′04″N 90°54′50″W
- Country: United States
- State: Iowa
- Counties: Cedar, Scott, Muscatine
- Founded: 1854

Government
  - Type: Mayor-council government

Area
  - City: 1.24 sq mi (3.20 km^{2})
  - Land: 1.24 sq mi (3.20 km^{2})
  - Water: 0 sq mi (0.00 km^{2})
- Elevation: 712 ft (217 m)

Population (2020)
  - City: 1,871
  - Density: 1,516.4/sq mi (585.48/km^{2})
  - Metro: 381,342 (134th)
- Time zone: UTC-6 (Central (CST))
  - Summer (DST): UTC-5 (CDT)
- ZIP code: 52747
- Area code: 563
- FIPS code: 19-22980
- GNIS feature ID: 2394581
- Website: cityofdurantiowa.com

Durant is a city in Cedar, Muscatine, and Scott counties in the U.S. state of Iowa. The population was 1,871 at the time of the 2020 census.

The Scott County portion of Durant is part of the Davenport–Moline–Rock Island, IA-IL Metropolitan Statistical Area, while the Muscatine County portion of the city is part of the Muscatine Micropolitan Statistical Area.

== History ==
Durant was platted in 1854 by Benjamin Brayton. The Chicago, Rock Island and Pacific Railroad was built through Durant in 1855. The settlement was first named Brayton for its founder, but the name was later changed to Durant for Thomas C. Durant, one of the pioneers of the Transcontinental Railroad and an individual who contributed the bulk of the funds needed to build the town's first public school.

== Geography ==
According to the United States Census Bureau, the city has a total area of 1.15 square miles (2.98 km^{2}), all land.

== Demographics ==
Historical populations
Year	Pop.	±%
1860	127	—
1870	373	+193.7%
1880	475	+27.3%
1890	505	+6.3%
1900	560	+10.9%
1910	720	+28.6%
1920	775	+7.6%
1930	733	−5.4%
1940	810	+10.5%
1950	1,075	+32.7%
1960	1,266	+17.8%
1970	1,472	+16.3%
1980	1,583	+7.5%
1990	1,549	−2.1%
2000	1,677	+8.3%
2010	1,832	+9.2%
2020	1,871	+2.1%
Source:"U.S. Census website". United States Census Bureau. and Iowa Data Center; Source: U.S. Decennial Census

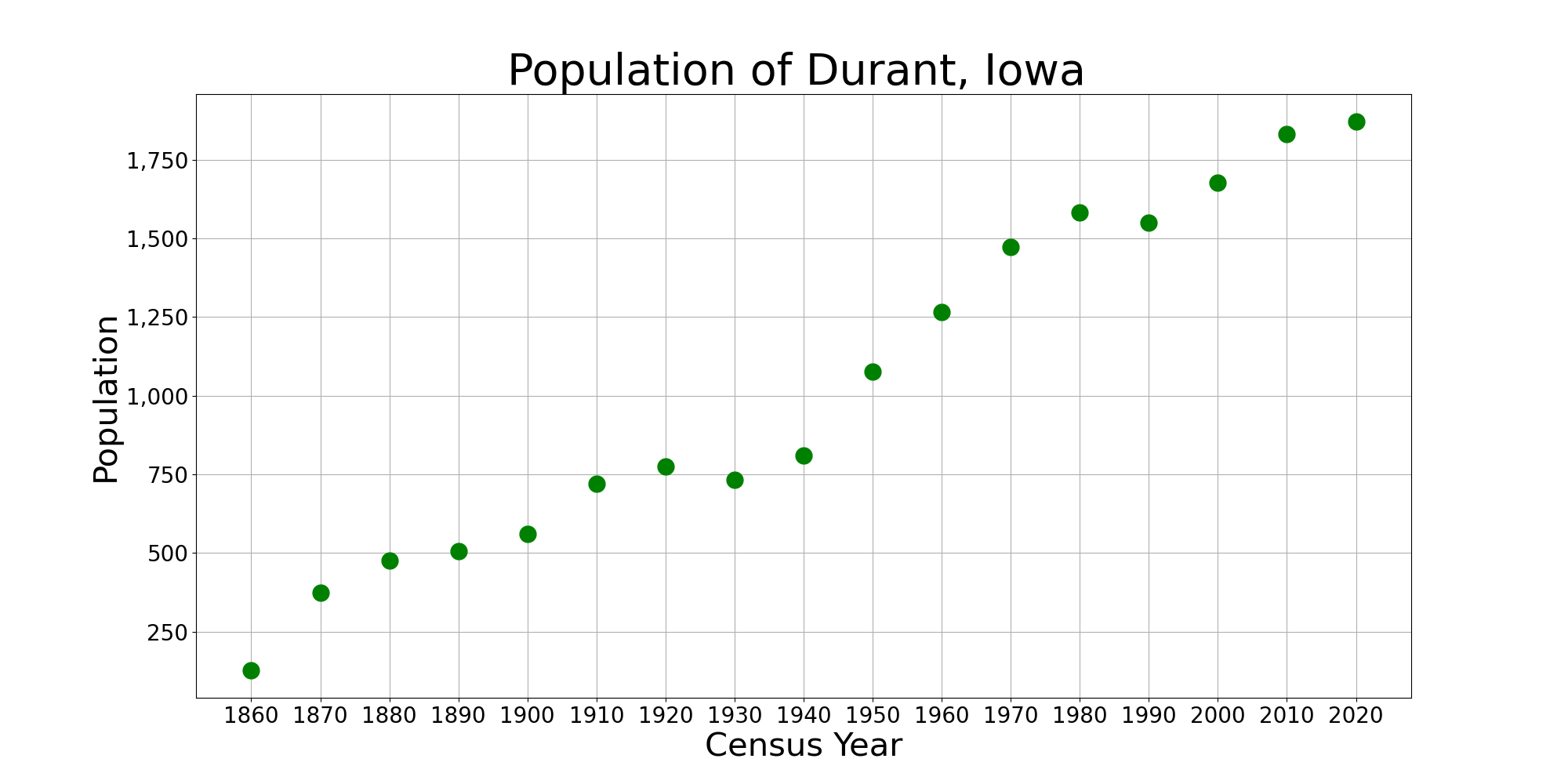
The population of Durant, Iowa from US census data

=== 2020 census ===
As of the 2020 census, there were 1,871 people, 760 households, and 504 families residing in the city. The population density was 1,500.4 inhabitants per square mile (579.3/km^{2}). There were 795 housing units at an average density of 637.5 per square mile (246.2/km^{2}). The median age was 41.4 years. 26.5% of the residents were under the age of 20; 4.4% were between the ages of 20 and 24; 24.1% were from 25 and 44; 28.1% were from 45 and 64; and 16.9% were 65 years of age or older. 24.3% of residents were under the age of 18. The gender makeup of the city was 49.1% male and 50.9% female. For every 100 females there were 96.3 males, and for every 100 females age 18 and over there were 93.1 males age 18 and over.

Of the households, 32.6% had children under the age of 18 living in them. Of all households, 53.3% were married-couple households, 9.6% were cohabiting-couple households, 14.3% were households with a male householder and no spouse or partner present, and 22.8% were households with a female householder and no spouse or partner present. 33.7% of all households were non-families. About 26.7% of all households were made up of individuals, and 15.0% had someone living alone who was 65 years of age or older.

Of the housing units, 4.4% were vacant. The homeowner vacancy rate was 1.3% and the rental vacancy rate was 12.4%. 0.0% of residents lived in urban areas, while 100.0% lived in rural areas.

Racial composition as of the 2020 census
Race	Number	Percent
White	1,762	94.2%
Black or African American	8	0.4%
American Indian and Alaska Native	11	0.6%
Asian	2	0.1%
Native Hawaiian and Other Pacific Islander	1	0.1%
Some other race	9	0.5%
Two or more races	78	4.2%
Hispanic or Latino (of any race)	43	2.3%

=== 2010 census ===
As of the census of 2010, there were 1,832 people, 743 households, and 512 families living in the city. The population density was 1,593.0 inhabitants per square mile (615.1/km^{2}). There were 783 housing units at an average density of 680.9 per square mile (262.9/km^{2}). The racial makeup of the city was 98.0% White, 0.1% African American, 0.2% Native American, 0.3% Asian, 0.3% from other races, and 1.0% from two or more races. Hispanic or Latino of any race were 1.7% of the population.

There were 743 households, of which 33.8% had children under the age of 18 living with them, 55.2% were married couples living together, 10.4% had a female householder with no husband present, 3.4% had a male householder with no wife present, and 31.1% were non-families. 26.4% of all households were made up of individuals, and 14% had someone living alone who was 65 years of age or older. The average household size was 2.45 and the average family size was 2.96.

The median age in the city was 40.3 years. 25.2% of residents were under the age of 18; 7.2% were between the ages of 18 and 24; 23.5% were from 25 to 44; 27% were from 45 to 64; and 17% were 65 years of age or older. The gender makeup of the city was 47.1% male and 52.9% female.

=== 2000 census ===
As of the census of 2000, there were 1,677 people, 672 households, and 469 families living in the city. The population density was 1,685.4 inhabitants per square mile (650.7/km^{2}). There were 702 housing units at an average density of 705.5 per square mile (272.4/km^{2}). The racial makeup of the city was 98.81% White, 0.12% African American, 0.18% Native American, 0.12% Asian, 0.06% Pacific Islander, 0.24% from other races, and 0.48% from two or more races. Hispanic or Latino of any race were 0.72% of the population.

There were 672 households, out of which 34.1% had children under the age of 18 living with them, 58.5% were married couples living together, 8.9% had a female householder with no husband present, and 30.2% were non-families. 26.8% of all households were made up of individuals, and 17.3% had someone living alone who was 65 years of age or older. The average household size was 2.48 and the average family size was 3.01.

In the city, the population was spread out, with 26.4% under the age of 18, 7.3% from 18 to 24, 28.7% from 25 to 44, 20.6% from 45 to 64, and 17.1% who were 65 years of age or older. The median age was 38 years. For every 100 females, there were 88.0 males. For every 100 females age 18 and over, there were 86.6 males.

The median income for a household in the city was $41,681, and the median income for a family was $51,667. Males had a median income of $37,188 versus $22,500 for females. The per capita income for the city was $19,399. About 3.8% of families and 5.8% of the population were below the poverty line, including 4.2% of those under age 18 and 13.0% of those age 65 or over.

== Education ==
The Durant Community School District, which is home to the Durant Wildcats, covers Durant and the surrounding rural areas. The school district includes an elementary school, a middle school, and a high school, with nearly all buildings connected and situated on a single campus.

== Media ==
The Wilton-Durant Advocate News is a weekly newspaper that is circulated in the Durant area and surrounding communities. Daily newspapers such as The Muscatine Journal and the Quad-City Times are available in Durant.

== Notable people ==
- Troy Price – political strategist and former Chair of the Iowa Democratic Party

== See also ==
- St. Paul's Episcopal Church (Durant, Iowa)
