= Durand de Bredons =

French medieval bishop

Durand de Bredons (died 1071) was a French Benedictine and bishop of Toulouse from about 1058. He was from Bredons in the Auvergne.

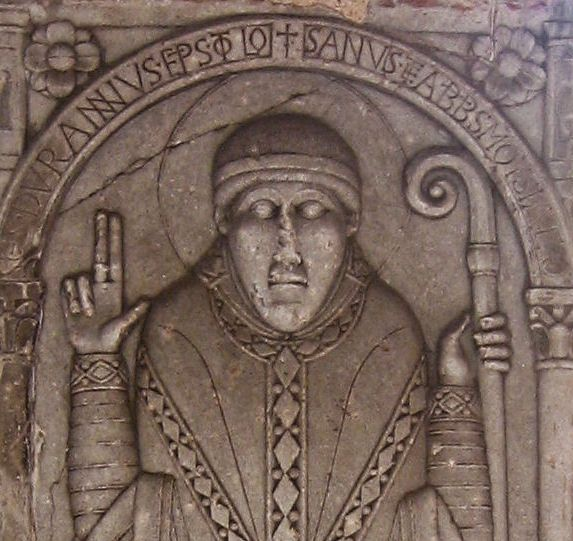
Durand de Bredons, representation on a column at Moissac Abbey.

He was from about 1048 Abbot of Moissac, a Cluniac reformer there.
