= Newton Commonwealth Golf Course =

Massachusetts public golf course

Coordinates: 42.3434°N 71.1736°W

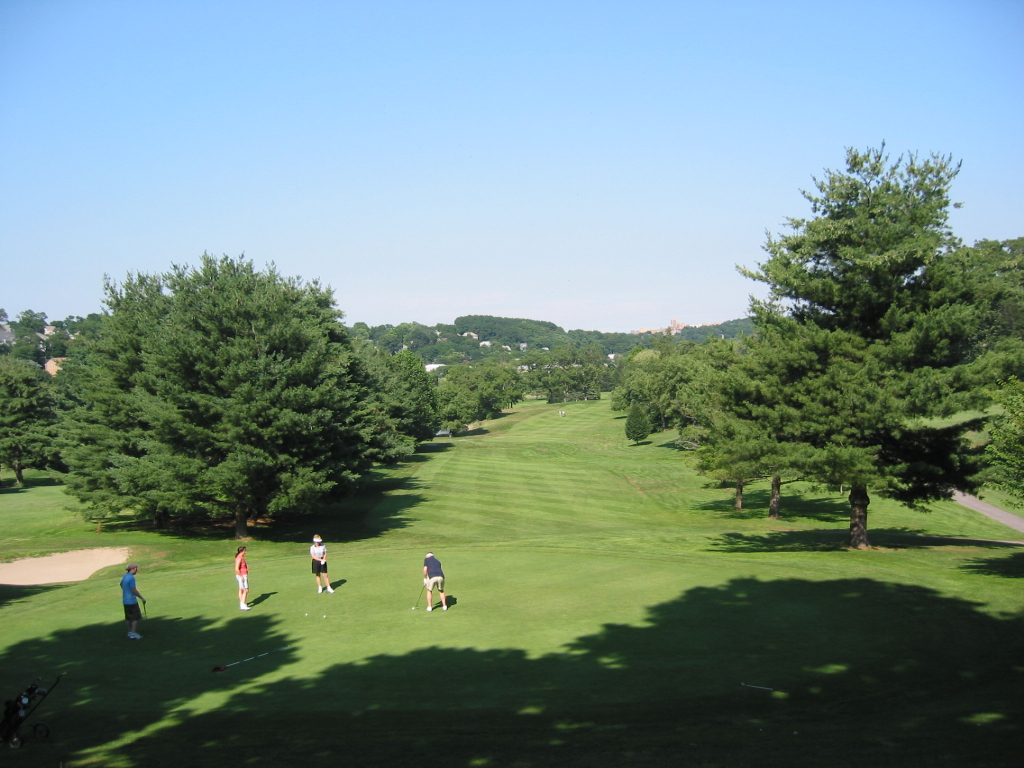
Golf course with view towards Boston

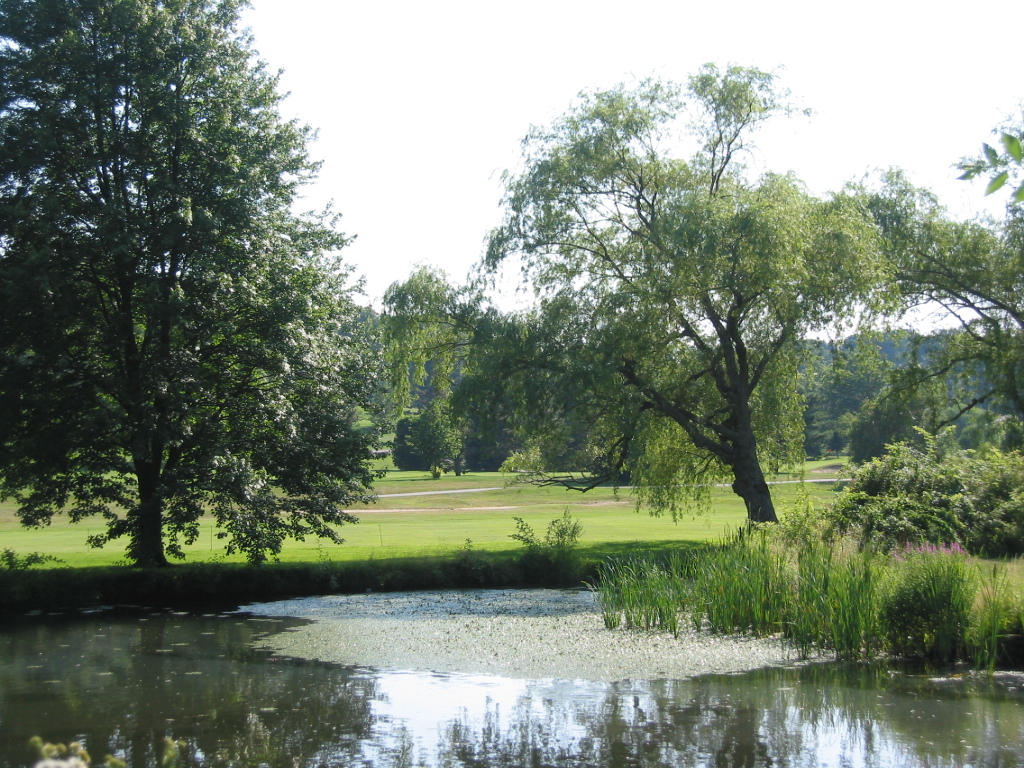
Pond on the course

The Newton Commonwealth Golf Course is an 18-hole public golf course located in Newton, Massachusetts, just outside the city of Boston. This course was originally created as a nine-hole course in 1897 and was previously named the Commonwealth Club. The course expanded into an 18-hole course and was redesigned by influential golf course designer and Newton resident Donald Ross. The course was converted into a public course in the late 1970s when the city of Newton purchased the Chestnut Hill Country Club because of the club's financial instability.

The course is currently managed by Sterling Golf Management Inc., and has a course rating of 67.0 with a slope rating of 125.
