= Thomas Durant (teller) =

Thomas Durant was the Teller of the Receipt of the Exchequer from ca. 1362 to 1398. He was a servant to Richard II.
