= Duran =

Duran or Durán may refer to:

== Places ==
- Davran, a village in Zanjan province, Iran whose alternate name is Duran
- Duran, Gers, a commune in France
- Durán, Ecuador
- Duran, Iran, a village in Gilan province, Iran
- Duran, New Mexico
- Duran, a barangay in Dumalag, Capiz, Philippines

== Entertainment ==
- Duran (comics), a supervillain in the pages of DC Comics
- Lieutenant Samir Duran, a character in the Starcraft universe
- Duran (Japanese musician), Japanese guitarist and musician

== Other uses ==
- Duran (surname)
- Duran (glass), or DURAN, a brand name of borosilicate glass

== See also ==
- Duran Duran, an English New Wave band
- Durand Durand, the villain in the 1968 film Barbarella
- Duran Consent Decree, stipulated agreement to Duran v. King court case
