= First Church in Newton =

Historic church in Massachusetts, United States

- East Parish Church
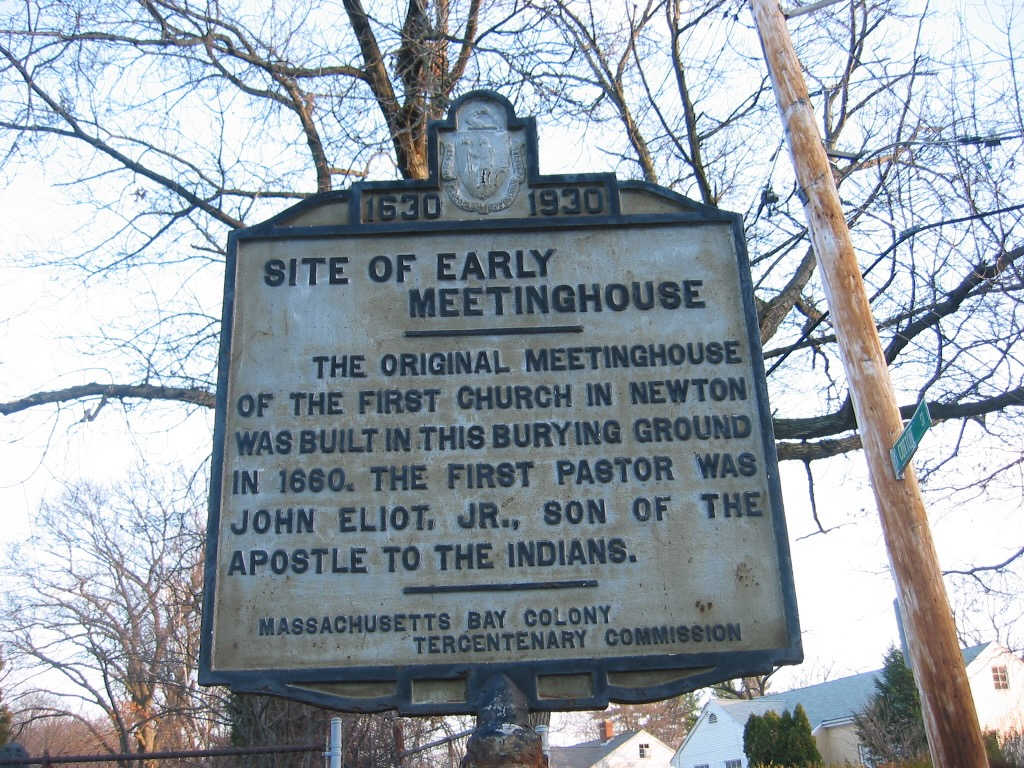
- First Church in Newton
- 42.341560°N 71.191946°W
- Location: Centre Street, Newton, Massachusetts

History
- Status: Demolished

Architecture
- Years built: 1660 (366 years ago)

The First Church in Newton (also known as East Parish Church), in what was Newton, Massachusetts Bay Colony, was a meetinghouse which stood on today's Centre Street, at its intersection with Cotton Street, in 1660. Its extant adjoining burial ground, today known as the East Parish Burying Ground, is listed on the National Register of Historic Places.

The first pastor of the meetinghouse was John Eliot Jr. (c. 1604–1690), who was known as the "apostle to the Native Americans." He is interred in the burying ground.

A Massachusetts historical marker was erected on the site, by the Massachusetts Bay Colony Tercentenary Commission, in 1930.

The Second Church of Newton was constructed, across the street, in 1698. Its present church building stands in downtown Newton Centre. The First Church dissolved in 1972 after failed attempts to merge with its two offspring churches, Second Church in Newton (West Parish) and Eliot Church.
