= Henry Durant =

American politician

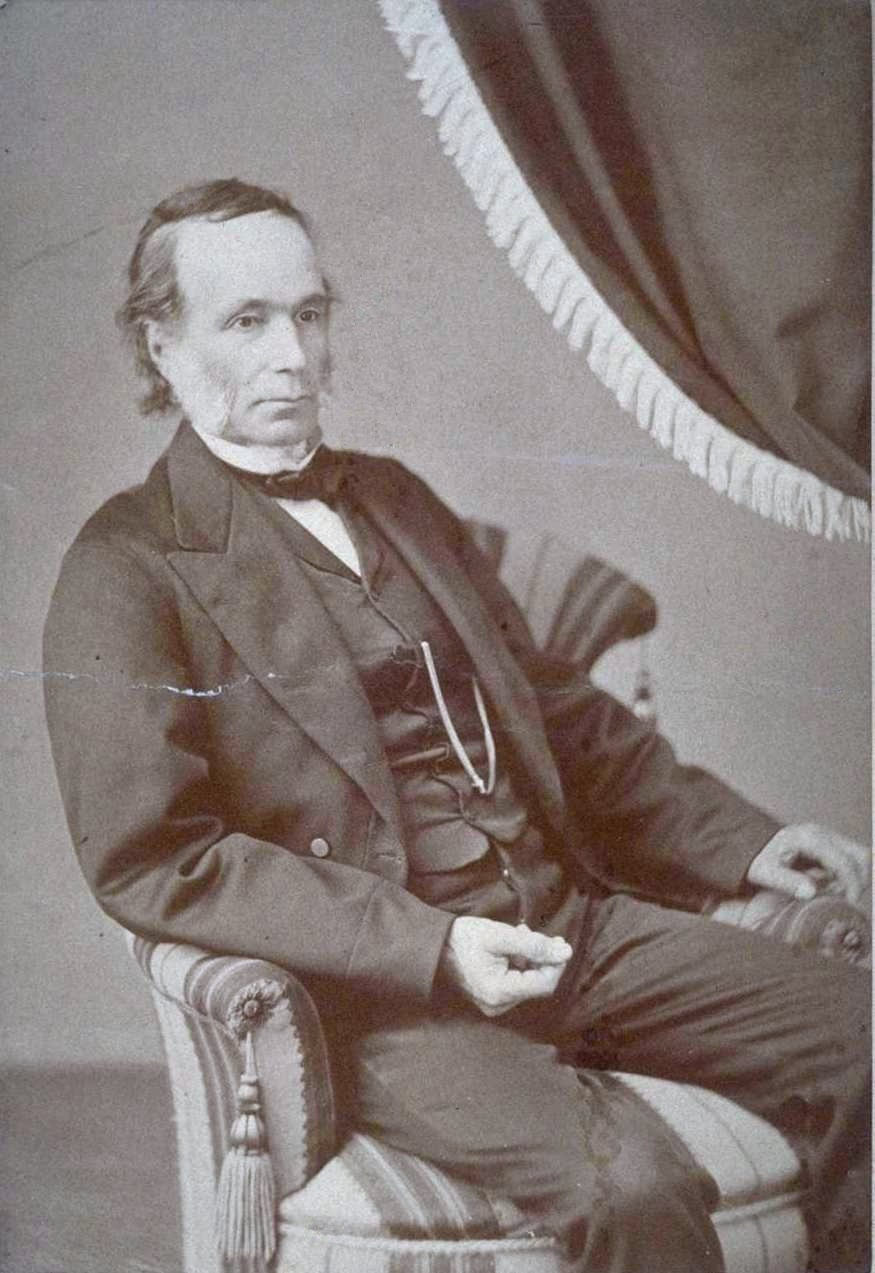

16th Mayor of Oakland
- In office March 4, 1873 – January 22, 1875
- Preceded by: Nathaniel W. Spaulding
- Succeeded by: Mack Webber

1st President of the University of California
- In office August 16, 1870 – 1872
- Succeeded by: Daniel Coit Gilman

Personal details
- Born: June 18, 1802 Acton, Massachusetts
- Died: January 22, 1875 (aged 72) Oakland, California
- Education: Yale College

Henry Durant (June 18, 1802 in Acton, Massachusetts – January 22, 1875 in Oakland, California) was an American minister and educator. He was the founding president of the University of California. Durant also served as Mayor of Oakland.

== Biography ==
Durant attended Phillips Academy and the Andover Theological Seminary in Andover, Massachusetts; he then studied for the ministry at Yale College, from which he graduated in 1827. In 1833 he was ordained pastor of the Congregational church of Byfield, Massachusetts. In the same year, he married Mary E. Buffett of Stanwich, Connecticut.

== Career ==
After serving in the ministry for 16 years, he resigned his pastorate and became headmaster of the Dummer Academy (today known as The Governor's Academy) in Byfield. He held that position from 1849 to 1852.

In 1853, Durant came to California and founded the Contra Costa Academy, as a private school for boys. In 1855, the school was chartered as the College of California.

The college later disincorporated and merged with the state of California's Agricultural, Mining, and Mechanical Arts College to create the University of California in 1868. Durant was elected the first president of the University of California on August 16, 1870, and resigned only two years later in order to relinquish the position to a younger man (Daniel Coit Gilman). In 1873, the University of California moved to its new Berkeley campus.

Old age did not keep Durant from being elected the 16th mayor of Oakland, although he only served for three years before dying in office, on January 22, 1875.

== See also ==
- Hotel Durant

Political offices
Preceded by Nathaniel W. Spaulding	Mayor of Oakland, California; 1873—1875	Succeeded by Mack Webber
Academic offices
Preceded by Position created	President of the University of California; 1870–1872	Succeeded by Daniel Coit Gilman
