= Graduate Berkeley =

Hotel in Berkeley, California

Coordinates: 37.8680°N 122.2563°W

Graduate by Hilton Berkeley
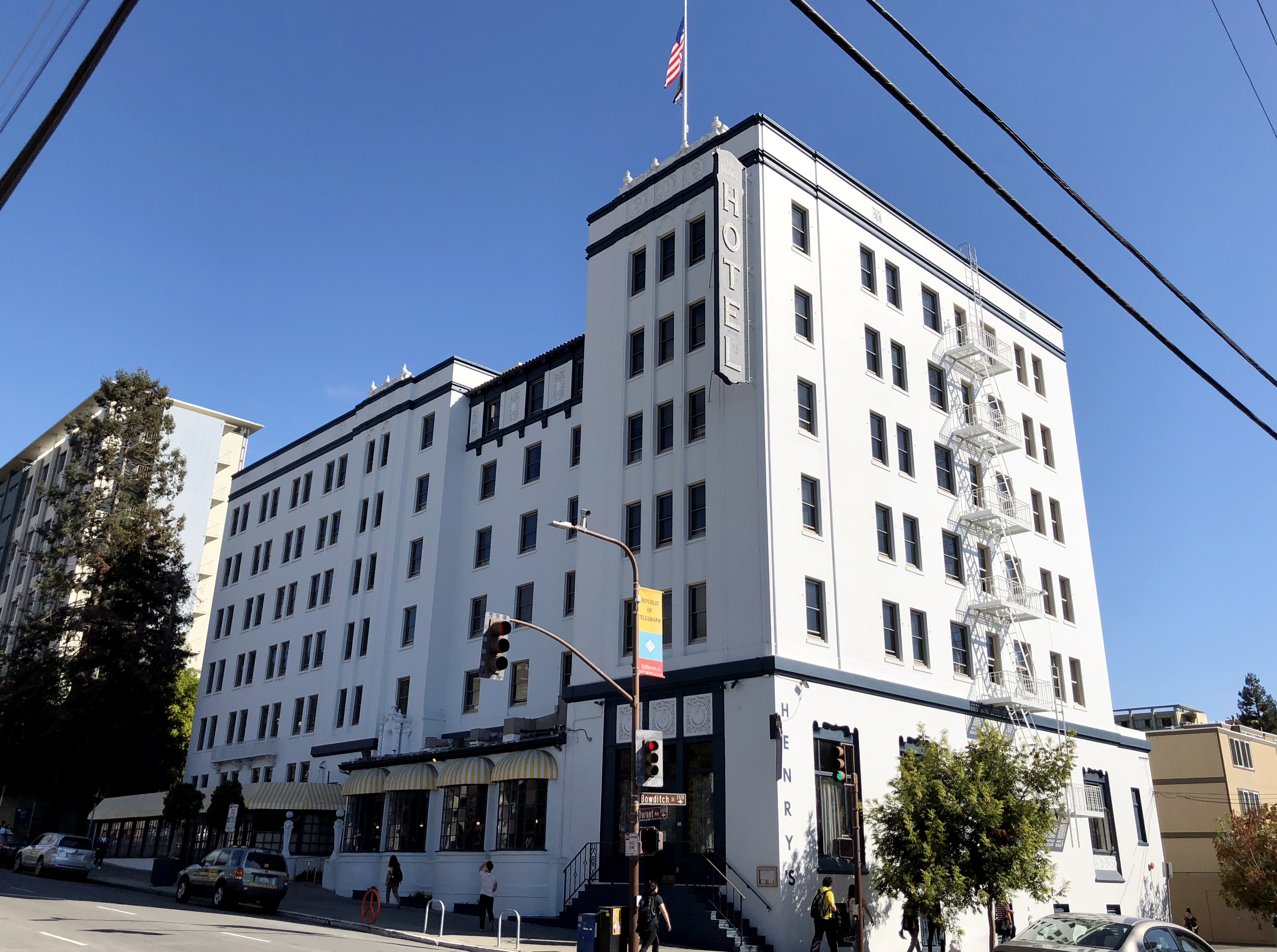
- Interactive map of the Graduate by Hilton Berkeley area
- Former names: Hotel Durant/Durant Hotel (1928-2017)

General information
- Location: Berkeley, California, United States, 2600 Durant Avenue
- Coordinates: 37.8679420, -122.2563050
- Opening: 1928
- Owner: AJ Capital Partners
- Management: Hilton Hotels

Technical details
- Floor count: 6

Design and construction
- Architect: W. H. Weeks

Other information
- Number of rooms: 144
- Number of restaurants: 1
- Parking: Onsite

Website
- Official website

The Graduate by Hilton Berkeley is a historic boutique hotel located in Berkeley, California in the United States. It is located in downtown Berkeley, just off campus of the University of California, Berkeley. The hotel is listed on the Berkeley register of historic places.

== History ==
The Hotel Durant was built, in the Spanish Colonial style, in 1928. It was designed by W. H. Weeks. It had 140 rooms and was both fire and earthquake resistant. It also had one of the first basement garages in the area.

It was named for Henry Durant. The bar, Henry's Publick House, is also a tribute to him. When the hotel opened it was described as a "modern luxury hotel". Harry Truman stayed at the hotel once.

=== Hostage incident ===
In 1990, 33 hostages were held at gun point at Henry's for seven hours by University of California, Berkeley student, Mehrdad Dashti, who had schizophrenia. The hotel bar was raided by police during the hold up. Dashti killed one hostage and an additional seven people were wounded.

=== Recent History ===
As of 2006, the hotel was owned and managed by Creative Hospitality. In 2007, the property was purchased by Joie de Vivre Hospitality for $14 million. Joie de Vivre invested $9 million in renovating the property. The hotel was in default in 2011 and the Royal Bank of Scotland took over as owner. Joie de Vivre continued to manage the property. In September 2012 it was put up for sale. The property was marketed by HVS Capital Corporation. In early 2013, they sold the hotel for approximately $27.3 million to Gemstone Hotels & Resorts. Upon the purchase, 98% of the staff remained from the previous ownership. The hotel is frequented by visitors to the university. In September 2015 it was purchased from Gemstone Hotels and Elliott Management Co. by Chicago-based Graduate Hotels for $47.5 million and renovated extensively, particularly the lobby and restaurant. Upon completion of renovations, the hotel was reopened as Graduate Berkeley in May 2017.

Hilton Worldwide bought the Graduate Hotels brand in May 2024, and operates the hotel as Graduate by Hilton Berkeley. However, the Graduate Hotels structures are still owned by AJ Capital Partners.

== Facilities ==
The hotel's theme is based on the University of California, Berkeley. Lonely Planet describes it as "cheekily" in style. A mobile made of books hangs from the lobby ceiling. The walls of the lobby are decorated in yearbook photos from the university. Hotel rooms feature "dictionary-covered shower curtains and bongs repurposed as bedside lamps."

The gastropub inside the hotel is Henry's Publick House. In 2009, Henry's "Everything but the Kitchen Sink Bloody Mary" Bloody Mary was voted the best in the East Bay by East Bay Express. The bloody mary features tomato juice made in-house and is topped off with a splash of Guinness.
