= Durant High School (Oklahoma) =

Coordinates: 34.002121°N 96.381835°W

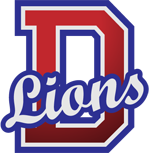

Location
- 950 Gerlach Drive; Durant, Oklahoma 74701; United States

Information
- School type: Public high school
- Established: 1919; 107 years ago
- School district: Durant Independent School District
- Principal: Amber Bullard
- Teaching staff: 63.40 (FTE)
- Grades: 9–12
- Enrollment: 1,005 (2023-2024)
- Student to teacher ratio: 15.85
- Colors: Red, white, blue
- Athletics conference: OSSAA 5A
- Mascot: Lion
- Website: www.durantisd.org/schools/durant-high-school

Durant High School (also known as Durant High and DHS) is a public secondary school in Durant, Oklahoma, serving grades 9, 10, 11, and 12. The school is part of the Durant Independent School District. Durant's mascot is the Lion. The high school has approximately 1,000 students, making it one of the largest high schools in Southeastern Oklahoma.

== History ==
The school first opened in 1919.

In September 2016 about 200 students engaged in a walk-out to protest mold in the school building. The school district superintendent, Duane Merideth, stated that no mold is visible but that parts of the school are closed due to humidity issues.

== National recognition ==
Durant High School was one of six schools nationwide to earn the recognition as a "Great American High School" in 2002.

During the summers, the campus has been a testing site for teachers achieving National Certification.

== Academics ==
The school offers numerous elective classes such as art, athletics, theater, debate, band, agricultural education, Spanish and Choctaw languages (Durant is the capital of, and second-largest city in, the Choctaw Nation), forensics, psychology, various health and medical classes, keyboarding and computer applications, business technology, information technology, choir, business, family & consumer sciences, career orientation, journalism, and also Advanced Placement for chemistry, biology, English, math, and physics.

== Organizations ==
There are several organizations such as Academic Commitment To Education, Academic Team, BPA, Calculus Club, Chemistry Club, DECA, Drug Free Youth, Forensics Club, FEA, FCCLA, FFA, FCA, HOSA, Key Club, Literary Club, Physics Club, RCY, Show Choir, SkillsUSA, VICA, Young Democrats of Durant, Young Republicans, and Youth & Government.

== Band ==
The band program consists of several bands:

Marching Band: The marching band is made up of all high school band members. They compete in various competitions and festivals, perform at football games, and periodically get invited to national band events.

Jazz Band: The jazz band is made up of any DHS band members who want to experience playing jazz music. They compete in the State Jazz competition each April.

Basketball Band: The basketball band is made up of volunteer DHS band members who want to perform during home basketball games.

== Athletics ==
There is baseball, basketball, cheerleading, cross country, football, golf, track & field, soccer, Softball, tennis, and wrestling. Approximately 700 are enrolled in at least one course with 980 for the entire district.

== Demographics ==
The racial makeup of high school students is 33% Native American, 1% Asian, 3% Hispanic, 1% African American, and 61% Caucasian. There is over 88 personnel with approximately 30 on coaching staff. The student to teacher ratio is 1:17 and a full class is considered 1:24. The school has a contract with Dell.

== New high school ==
On April 1, 2008, the vote to increase the city's sales tax 5/8 cent for 25 years in order to provide funding for Durant's new high school passed. The tax is 9.125% on all items sold in Durant. Construction of Durant's new high school began in the fourth quarter of 2009 and completed in 2011. It was built in north Durant along U.S. 69/75, boasting a capacity of 1,200 students. The estimated cost of the new school is $40 million. Grades 7 and 8 filled the former high school building on 7th street, because of the aging and cramped school facility located on 6th street.

The sales tax increase went into effect on July 1, 2008, and has an estimated end on June 30, 2033.
