= Second Church in Newton =

Historic church in Massachusetts, United States

Coordinates: 42°20′50″N 71°13′34″W

- Second Church of Newton
- U.S. National Register of Historic Places
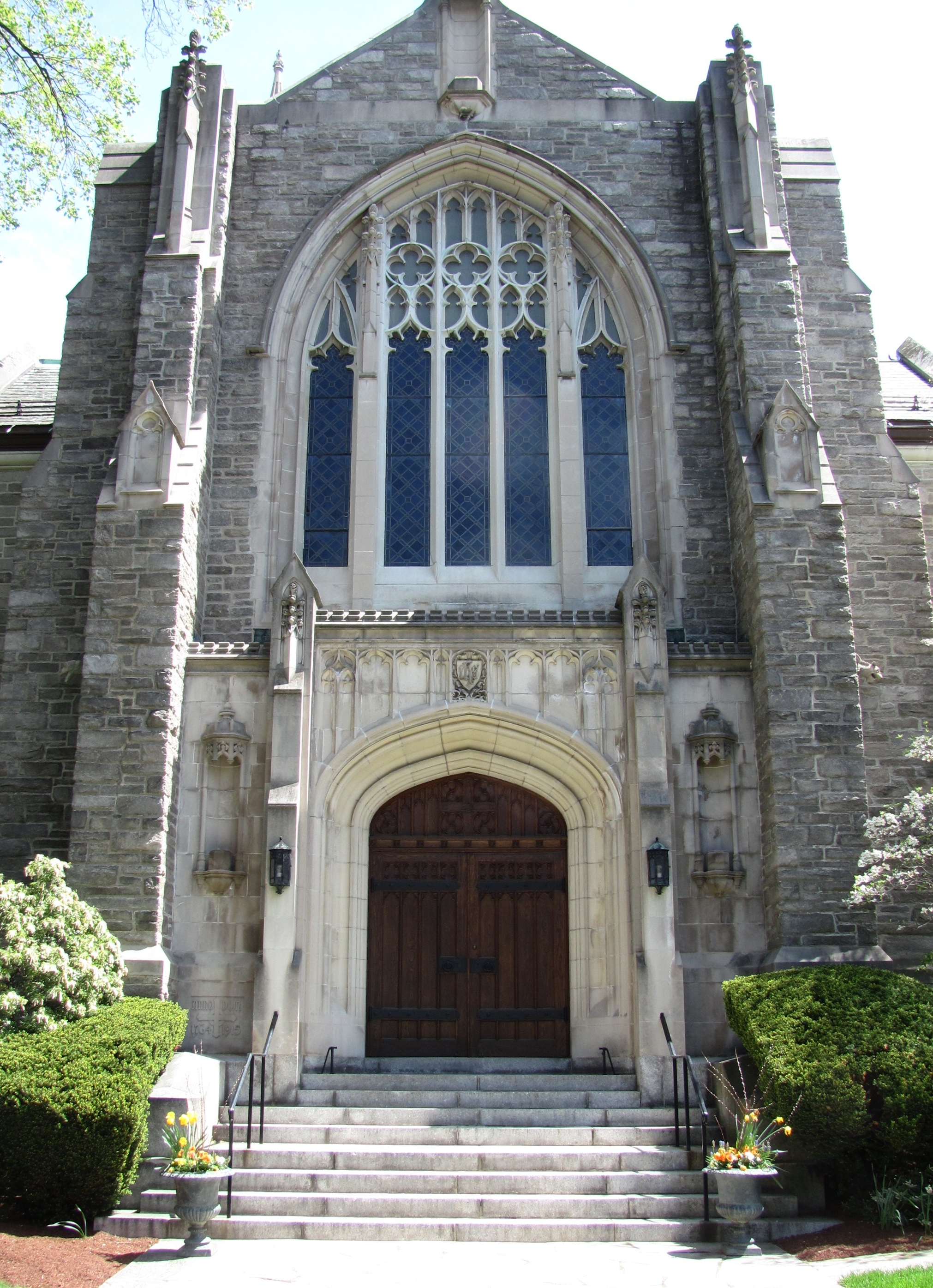
- Second Church in Newton
- Location: 60 Highland Street, West Newton, Massachusetts
- Built: 1916
- NRHP reference No.: 90000049
- Added to NRHP: March 16, 1990

The Second Church in Newton, United Church of Christ, is located at 60 Highland Street in West Newton, a village of Newton, Massachusetts. This church is rooted in the Congregational denomination, welcomes all visitors, and does not require uniformity of belief. Its present church building, a Gothic Victorian structure designed by architects Allen & Collens and completed in 1916, was listed in the National Register of Historic Places (as "Second Church of Newton") in 1990.

== Description and history ==
The current building is the third home for this congregation.

West Parish of Newton was organized in 1764 and formally recognized in 1778. At that time it was Newton's second parish. As the congregation grew, a meeting house was built on Washington Street in 1848, when the first structure was adapted for use as town hall as part of the town government's move to West Newton. By the start of the 20th century, the congregation was outgrowing its Washington Street home.

Planning to build a new structure began in 1908. The land was purchased in 1913 and the cornerstone laid in 1914, the 150th anniversary of the congregation. The building was designed by the noted ecclesiastical architects Allen & Collens, a leading firm with offices in Boston and New York, with Charles Collens having the principal role for the design. The firm was noted for its Gothic Revival design work including the Cloisters Museum in New York.

The location of the Second Church in Newton is on the east side of Highland Street, just south of the Massachusetts Turnpike and the West Newton Village Center Historic District at the rise of West Newton Hill, making the spire visible from all directions. The parcel it occupies is bounded on the north by the highway and on the east by Chestnut Street; both Chestnut and Highland are collector roads leading through the residential area of West Newton Hill.

The church sanctuary is an elaborate example of Gothic Revival architecture executed in stone. The adjoining Parish House, begun in 1915 and extended and completed in 1938, has stucco walls and Tudor Revival features. All parts of the building are remarkably intact with minimal alterations.

The main façade, facing west toward Highland Street, is narrow, with a buttressed projecting section housing the main entrance in a recessed arch, with a large stained-glass window above. The side walls are also buttressed, with pointed-arch windows in each of four bays.

The prominent spire at the north east corner reaches to 196 feet with decorative finials in limestone. It is topped by two figures, a young man facing east toward the sunrise and an old man facing west towards the sunset. The spire is an immediately recognizable landmark for West Newton, visible to travelers on the Massachusetts Turnpike and the Commuter Rail. The bell in the tower was brought from the previous building and still operates. It was cast at the George Handel Holbrook Foundry in Medway in 1848.

There are gargoyles on either side of the front entrance. A square tower rises at the eastern end of the north elevation. To the north of the main building, the Parish House, an education wing with Tudor styling and leaded casement windows, was added in 1938. The architectural firm Allen, Collens & Willis was responsible for the design.

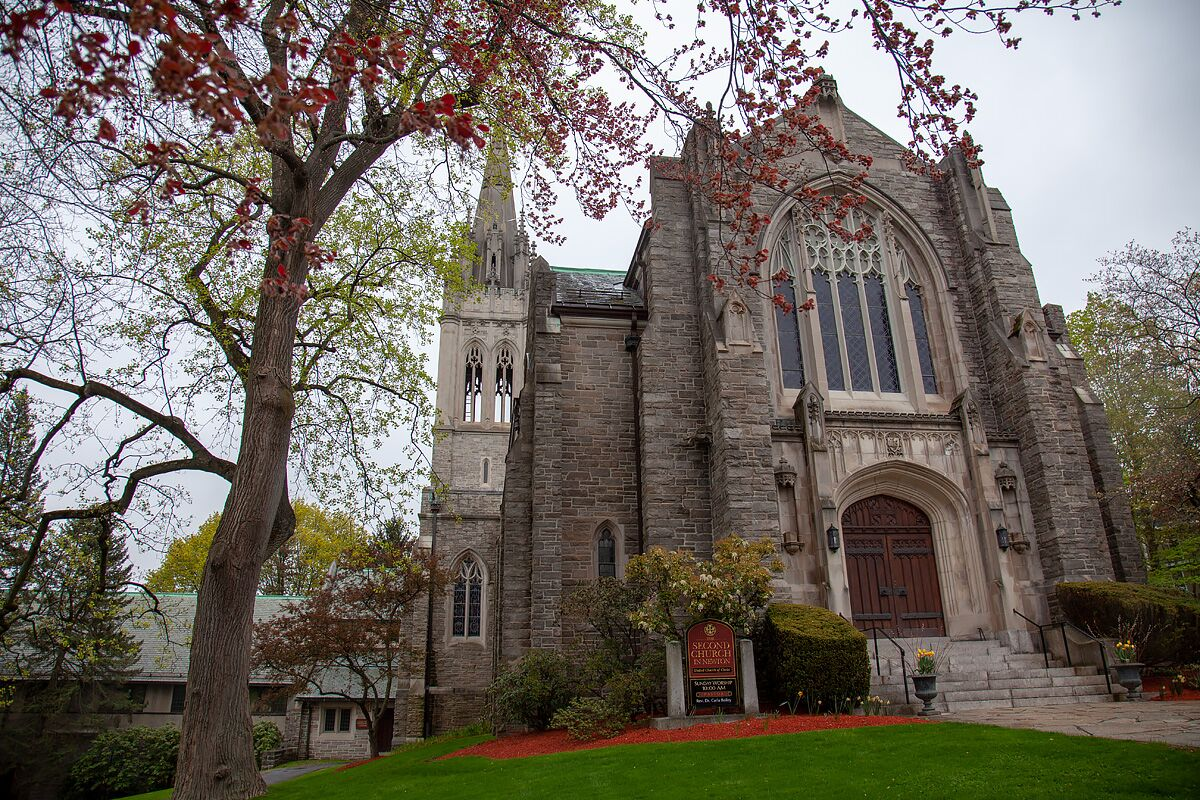
West elevation. Photo by John Borchard

The interior of the sanctuary was inspired by European Gothic elements from the 12th to 16th centuries. The ceiling, which is supported by stone pillars recalling the trunks of trees, is the shape of an inverted boat, referencing Noah's ark and the sanctuary it provided.

The stained glass windows include both a number of original panels and others added in the years between WWI and the 1960s, through gifts and sponsorship of parishioners. The oldest windows contain glass imported from Europe and were designed by Henry Wynd Young and Charles Jay Connick. In the Fuller Chapel in the north transept are found the two windows designed by Henry Wynd Young, considered to be an unusually gifted artisan at the time. The windows at the rear of the nave, designed by nationally renowned artist and Newtonville resident Charles Jay Connick, are also original to the building and have distinctive crosses at the top of each panel. In the post-WWII period, three other windows designed by Connick Associates were added, with themes of world peace, pastoral care, and prayer and communion. In a more modern design in deep blues from the glass studio of William Willet, a window in the south transept recognizes the role of health care professionals.

The distinctive and elaborate original wood carvings crafted in red oak at the altar, choir stalls, pulpit and lectern were created by Johannes Kirchmayer. The natural elements included, such as branches, birds and small animals, are reflective of the Arts and Crafts design style.

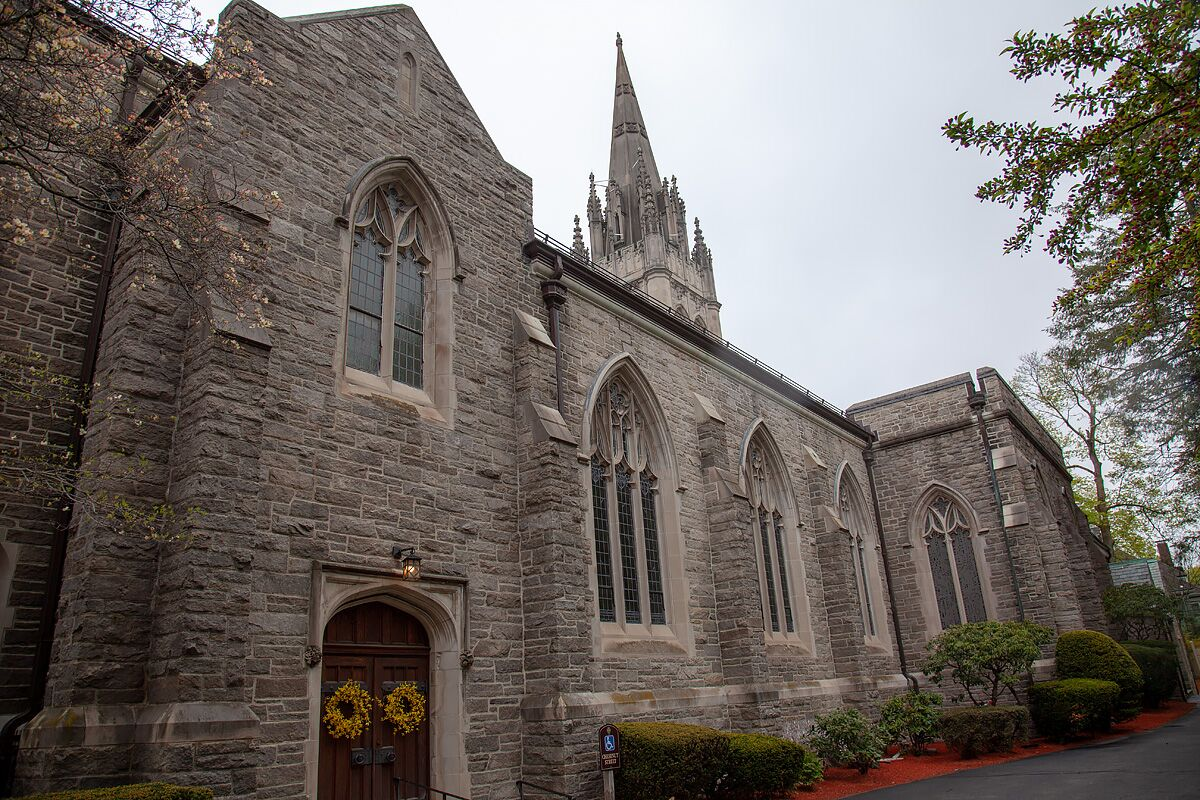
South elevation. Photo by John Borchard

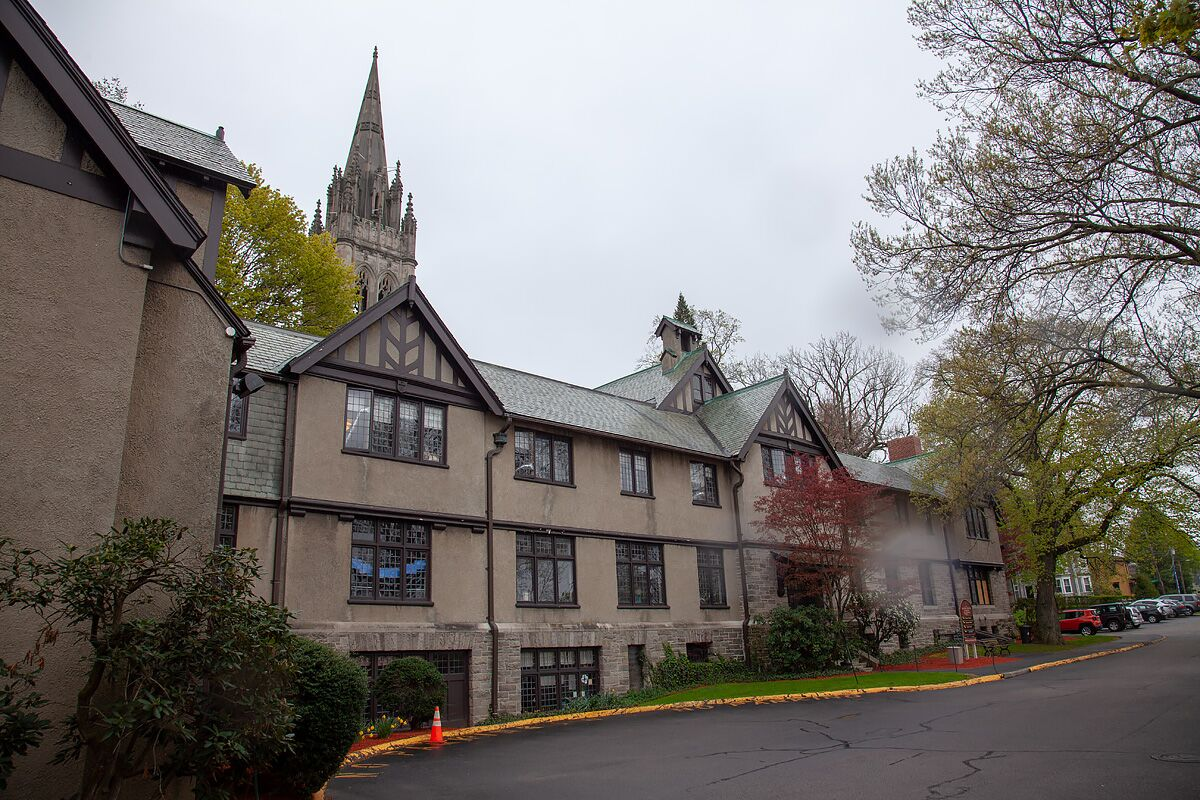
North side. View of Parish House. Photo by John Borchard

== See also ==
- National Register of Historic Places listings in Newton, Massachusetts
- First Church in Newton
- "Newton's American Gothic Landmark celebrates 100 Years." Newton Tab. September 14, 2016. https://newton.wickedlocal.com/news/20160914/newtons-american-gothic-landmark-celebrates-100-years-
