= Durant Independent School District =

School district in Oklahoma

Location
- 1323 Waco Street, Durant, OK United States of America

District information
- Type: Public, Independent
- Grades: PK - 12
- Superintendent: Duane Merideth
- Budget: $23,463,370

Students and staff
- Students: 3,746
- Staff: 246

Other information
- Website: www.durantisd.org

Durant Independent School District is a public school district based in Durant, Oklahoma, United States. Durant ISD takes some students in from places such as Calera, Armstrong, Mead, Silo, Caddo, and Atoka. In terms of enrollment, Durant ISD is the largest public school district in Southeastern Oklahoma.

== History ==
Constructed in 1919, the former home of Durant Middle School originally served as the Durant high school and housed students grades 6 through 12. From the mid-1950s to the mid-1990s, it housed grades 6 through 8, before switching to serve 7th and 8th grade regular classes and 7th, 8th, and 9th grade extracurricular activities.

The Durant Intermediate School was formerly the Bryan Memorial Hospital before the construction of the Medical Center of Southeastern Oklahoma in 1987. It underwent renovations beginning in 1994. Durant Intermediate School converted a north wing to house 4th grade classes, which was completed just before the 2006–2007 school year.

George Washington Elementary School was opened in 1934, but no longer serves as an elementary school after being closed in mid-2003. Vision Academy was moved to the building in the same year.

The district's current administration building was formerly Durant Medical Supply. The Indian Education for Native Americans was formerly Bryan County Health Department. Renovation for this area began since 1994 and began with 6th grade first. 4th grade was added in 2006 when Vision Academy moved to George Washington Elementary School in 2003.

== District geography ==
The Durant Middle School was moved from its 6th street location to 7th street in 2011, after the new high school campus had been completed. Expansion for the partially renovated prior campus on 6th street is impossible because of the small amount of land available, which has sealed off one street with parking is located at a vacant lot north of the school.

The Durant Intermediate School is located in the medical district in the northern section of Durant. Nearby is the district's administration office.

Northwest Heights Elementary School is located in North Durant.

Robert E. Lee Elementary School is located in South Durant.

Washington Irving Elementary School is located in central Durant, near the new location of the middle school.

== List of schools ==
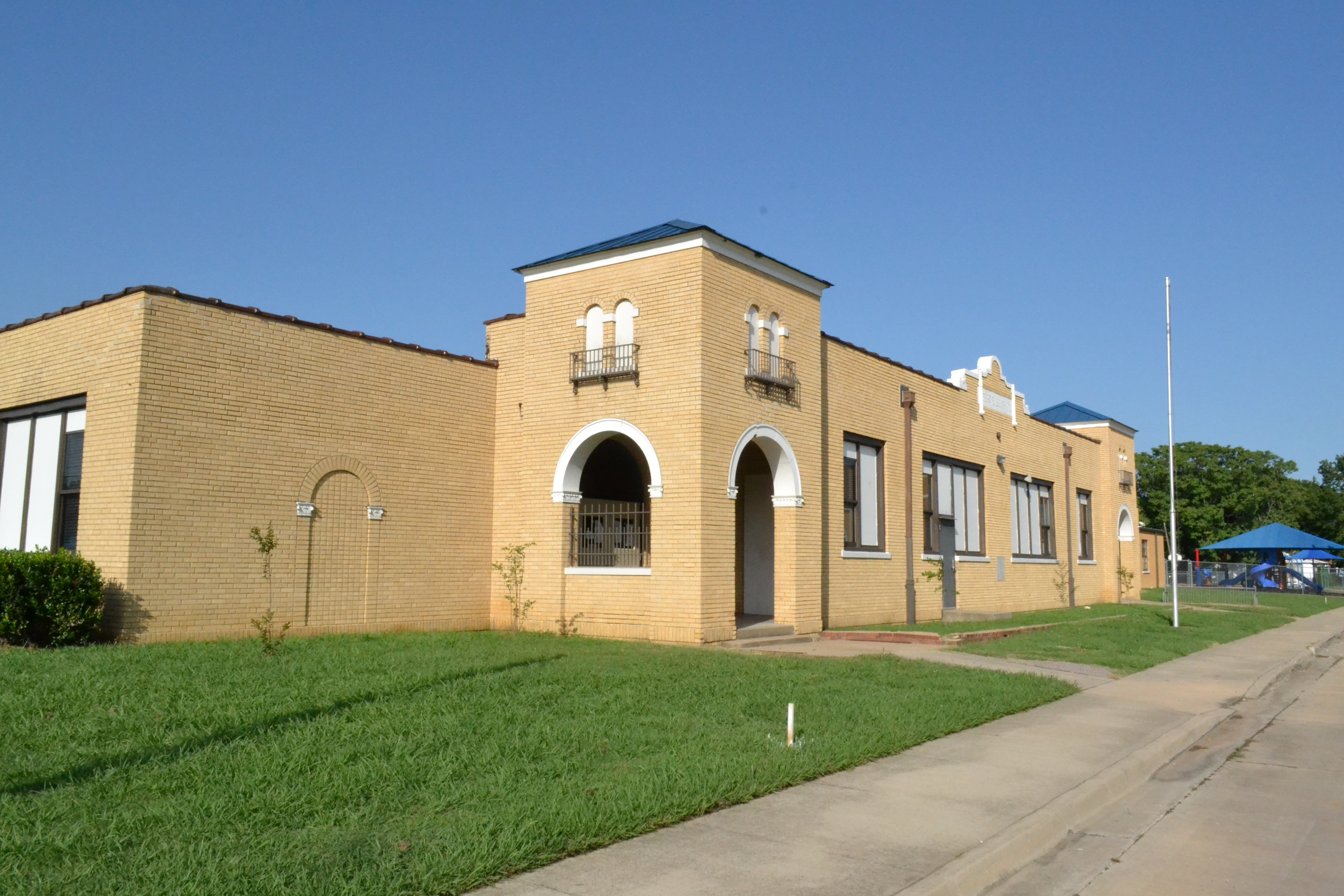
Robert E. Lee School

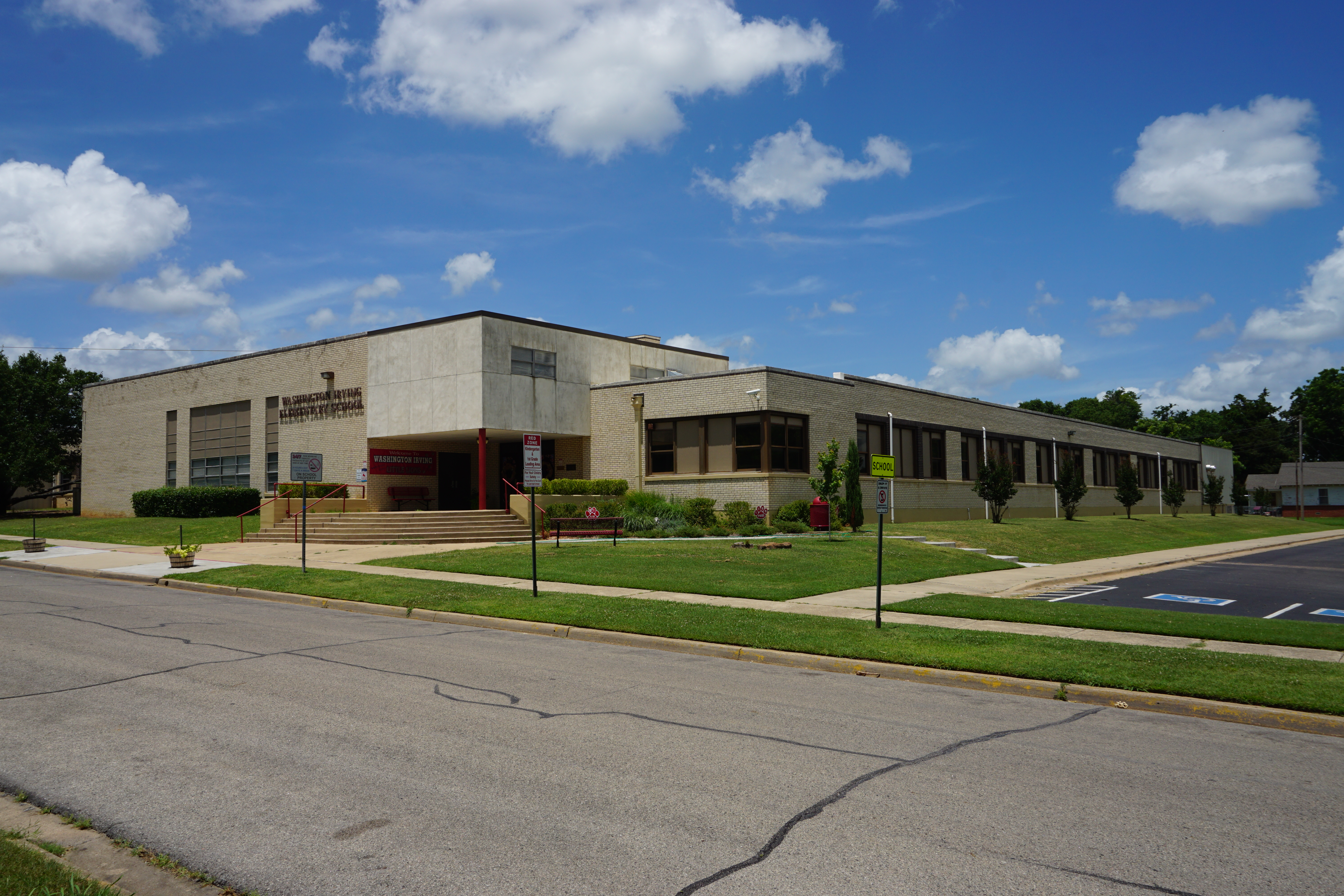
Washington Irving Elementary School

- Durant High School, serving approximately 1000 students in grades 9–12.
- Durant Middle School, serving approximately 450 students in the 7th and 8th grade
- Durant Intermediate School, serving approximately 700 students in grades 4-6
- Robert E. Lee Elementary, serving approximately 200 students in grades PK-3. Building is listed on the National Register of Historic Places.
- Northwest Heights Elementary, serving approximately 550 students in grades PK-3
- Washington Irving Elementary, serving approximately 550 students in grades PK-3

=== Other buildings ===
Originally used for classes from 1934 to 2003, the former George Washington Elementary school building is now used for office space for Safe Schools - Healthy Students, Vision Academy, Pathways Academy, Cross Roads Academy, and a soup kitchen.

Another building adjacent to Durant Intermediate School houses district administration offices

== Extracurricular activities ==
Durant Independent School District has many extracurricular activities, including the following:

- Marching Band
- Concert Band
- Jazz Band
- Men and Women's Choir
- Bowling Team
- Debate
- Speech & Theater
- Baseball and Softball
- Men and Women's Basketball
- Cross Country
- Track
- Men and Women's Golf
- Soccer
- Tennis
- Wrestling
- Cheerleading
- Football

Durant High School also provides access to Academic Clubs, Special Interest Clubs, and a Media Team.

Durant Activities have been widely successful:

The "Pride of Durant" marching and concert band won many awards at OSSAA State Contests, and performed pre-game at multiple bowl games, with other bands at halftime.

The Durant Women's Golf Team placed first in State, with an individual student placing first three consecutive years.

Other organizations have also placed in State.

== Annual Reports ==
School and district report cards can be seen here.

== Demographics ==
The racial makeup of public school students is 35% Native American, 1% Asian, 2% African American, 5% Hispanic, and 56% Caucasian.
