= Durant High School (Iowa) =

Public secondary school in Durant, Iowa, United States

Coordinates: 41.603°N 90.913°W

Durant Junior/Senior High School

Location
- 408 Seventh Street; Durant, Iowa 52747; USA

Information
- Type: Public Secondary
- Established: c. 1910s
- Oversight: Durant Community School District
- Superintendent: Joe Burnett
- Principal: Joel Diederichs
- Teaching staff: 25.09 (FTE)
- Grades: 9–12
- Enrollment: 340 (2024-2025)
- Student to teacher ratio: 13.55
- Colors: Blue and Gold
- Athletics conference: River Valley Conference
- Mascot: Wildcat
- Website: DHS Web site

Durant Junior/Senior High School, or Durant High School is a rural public high school located in Durant, Iowa. The school is part of the Durant Community School District.

Located at 408 Seventh Street in Durant (approximately two miles south of Interstate 80), Durant High School draws students from areas of southeastern Cedar County, northeastern Muscatine County and western Scott County, plus the community of Stockton.

== History ==
The current Durant High School was completed in 1957, the same year the school fielded its first competitive football team. There have been many additions and renovations to the buildings in the years since.

Durant High School is a participant in a whole-grade sharing agreement with the nearby Bennett Community School District. Each district is responsible for its own elementary school, while Bennett sends its junior high and high school students to Durant. This agreement has been in place since the 2005-2006 school year.

== Athletics ==
Durant (teams were Durant-Bennett from 2005 to 2008) sports teams are known as the Wildcats; their uniforms display the school's colors of blue and gold.

As of 2026, Durant is classified as a 2A school (Iowa's second-smallest tier schools) in some sports, and 1A (smallest tier schools) in others, according to the Iowa High School Athletic Association and Iowa Girls High School Athletic Union. The school is a member of the 16-team River Valley Conference (RVC), which comprises similar-sized schools from communities in eastern Iowa. Prior to joining the RVC and its predecessor, the Cedar Valley Conference, in 2008, Durant was a member of the Eastern Iowa Hawkeye Conference (EIHC), a league that dated to the 1950s.

The school fields athletic teams in 13 sports, including:

- Summer: Baseball and softball.
- Fall: Football, volleyball, and boys' and girls' cross country.
- Winter: Boys' and girls' basketball and wrestling.
- Spring: Boys' and girls' track and field; and boys' and girls' golf.

Durant enjoys its biggest rivalries with neighboring school Wilton.

=== Successes ===
- 2013 Class 2A State Champions in Softball
- In 2012, the Wildcats placed third at the state softball tournament, and topped it in 2013 by winning the state championship.
- 2001 Class 1A State Champions in Boys' Cross Country
- 4-time State Champions in Girls' Cross Country(1996, 1997, 2000, 2002)

1985 Class 2A State Champions in Boys' Golf

== Controversy ==
In the fall of 2009, Durant High School principal Monica Rouse was placed on administrative leave, beginning several years of turmoil in the Durant community. Durant school officials cited a failure on Rouse's part to maintain accurate student records, a lack of professional judgement and inability to be a positive leader or role model, and the school board agreed to consider firing Rouse. Rouse had the case appealed to the Iowa Board of Educational Examiners, and in March 2010 an administrative law judge issued an 86-page decision declaring Rouse should keep her job. On March 30, the school board agreed to terminate high school principal Monica Rouse's contract; Iowa law allows entities such as school boards to reject administrative law judges' rulings, since they are non-binding.

Rouse appealed the Board's decision in Cedar County District court. On March 11, 2011, Judge Nancy Tabor sided with Rouse and ordered the district to reinstate her as principal, saying, "Ms. Rouse was a competent and devoted principal". The courts re-affirmed this ruling on May 11, 2011.

The Board appealed this decision to the Iowa Appellate Courts. On January 19, 2012, The Iowa Court of Appeals affirmed the district court's ruling that Rouse should get her job back. The Durant School Board appealed this to the Iowa Supreme Court. On April 11, 2012, the Iowa Supreme Court voted not to hear the appeal, affirming the lower courts decisions.

The board allowed Rouse to return to active employment, but in a reduced capacity. The board placed restrictions on Rouse's access to the building, educational records, and communication with students and staff. Rouse file an action against the board claiming a hostile work environment. That action, a contempt of court order, and other suits against the board were settled in December 2012 with the school board agreeing to pay Rouse approximately $850,000 in addition to her salary and benefits from the 2009 through 2012 school years, bringing her total compensation to about $1.25 million. As part of the settlement, Rouse agreed to step down as principal, ending the three-year legal battle with the district.

== Notable alumni ==
- Troy Price – political strategist and former Chair of the Iowa Democratic Party

== See also ==
- List of high schools in Iowa
