= Durant House (St. Charles, Illinois) =

Historic house in Illinois, United States

- U.S. National Register of Historic Places
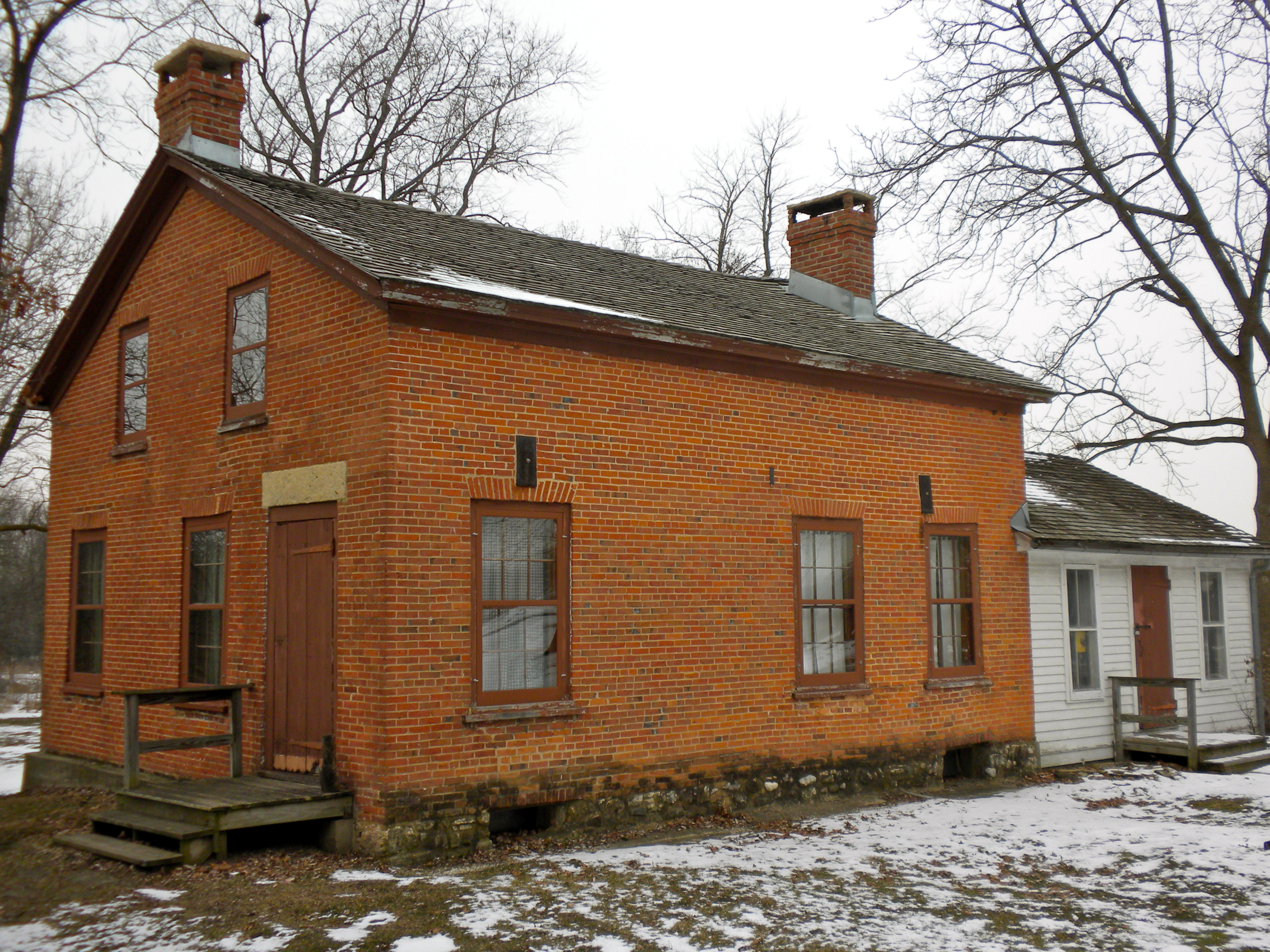
- Durant House in 2010

- Location within Illinois Location within the United States
- Nearest city: St. Charles, Illinois
- Coordinates: 41°55′38″N 88°20′50″W
- Area: 1 acre (0.40 ha)
- Built: 1843
- Architect: Bryant Durant
- NRHP reference No.: 76000714
- Added to NRHP: June 18, 1976

The Durant House or Durant–Peterson House is a historic residence in unincorporated St. Charles Township, Illinois near St. Charles. It was listed on the National Register of Historic Places in 1976.

== History ==
Bryant Durant was born in Ware, Massachusetts in 1808. He began work as a bricklayer when he was 13, but needed to leave Massachusetts in the 1830s to pursue better economic opportunity. Durant moved to St. Charles in 1837 to work at a family store. He purchased a 195 acres (79 ha) lot near the city to build a house in 1843. He lived in the house until 1881, when he sold it to Godfrey Peterson. Peterson repaired and remodeled the house throughout the following decade. The Peterson family owned the lot until 1934. It was sold to the Sheldon family, who sold it to the Kane County Forest Preserve District in 1964. The district voted to restore the house as a historic site, and furnished it with 19th-century furnishings. It was listed on the National Register of Historic Places on June 18, 1976, as an example of a typical modest home of the mid-19th century, and is open for free (with a suggested donation) to the public by the Preservation Partners of the Fox Valley.

== Architecture ==
The two-story house was originally built with locally fired brick, originally featuring three rooms downstairs, four rooms upstairs, and a basement. Peterson installed a wooden three-room addition on the first floor upon buying the house in 1881. The original windows were replaced sometime after 1898, but replicas of the original were installed during the restoration in the 1970s. The basement has a fieldstone wall, but its dirt floor had to be covered with concrete to accommodate a heating unit. A keeping room was added to the basement during the Peterson renovation, and now features a staircase leading to the exterior. The kitchen and the first floor bathroom are in original room with little modernization. The third original room needed to be reconstructed, as it had been remodeled to function as a garage at some point.
