= Durrant baronets =

Title in the Baronetage of Great Britain

Escutcheon of the Durrant baronets of Scottow

The Durrant Baronetcy, of Scottow in the County of Norfolk, is a title in the Baronetage of Great Britain. It was created on 22 January 1784 for Thomas Durrant, High Sheriff of Norfolk in 1784.

== Durrant baronets, of Scottow (1784) ==
- Sir Thomas Durrant, 1st Baronet (c. 1722–1790)
- Sir Thomas Durrant, 2nd Baronet (1775–1829)
- Sir Henry Thomas Estridge Durrant, 3rd Baronet (1807–1861)
- Sir Henry Josias Durrant, 4th Baronet (1838–1875)
- Sir William Robert Estridge Durrant, 5th Baronet (1840–1912)
- Sir William Henry Estridge Durrant, 6th Baronet (1872–1953)
- Sir William Henry Estridge Durrant, 7th Baronet (1901–1994)
- Sir William Alexander Estridge Durrant, 8th Baronet (1929–2018)
- Sir David Alexander Durrant, 9th Baronet (born 1960)

The heir apparent is the current holder's eldest son, Alexander Llewelyn Estridge Durrant (b. 1990).

== Notes ==
Baronetage of Great Britain
Preceded by Lombe baronets	Durrant baronets of Scottow; 22 January 1784	Succeeded by Pepys baronets
