= Durant Community School District =

Public school district in Durant, Iowa, United States

Address
- 408 7th Street Durant, Cedar County, Iowa, 52747; United States
- Coordinates: 41°36′17″N 90°54′47″W

District information
- Type: Public school district
- Grades: K-12
- Superintendent: Joe Burnett
- Schools: 3
- Budget: $9,649,000 (2020-21)
- NCES District ID: 1909600

Students and staff
- Students: 683 (2022-23)
- Teachers: 49.02 FTE
- Staff: 61.63 FTE
- Student–teacher ratio: 13.93
- Athletic conference: River Valley Conference
- District mascot: Wildcats
- Colors: Royal Blue and Gold

Other information
- Website: www.durant.k12.ia.us

The Durant Community School District is a rural public school district in Cedar County, Iowa. Based in Durant, it spans areas of southeastern Cedar County, northeastern Muscatine County and western Scott County.

Durant consists of a high school, a junior high school and elementary school, all located in a centrally located building in Durant. The district is governed by a five-member board of directors, which meets monthly at the district's administration center in Durant. The superintendent is Joe Burnett.

The district is a participant in a whole-grade sharing agreement with the nearby Bennett Community School District. Each district is responsible for its own elementary school, while Bennett sends its junior high and high school students to Durant. This agreement has been in place since the 2005-2006 school year.

The school district is accredited by the North Central Association of Colleges and Schools and the Iowa Department of Education.

== History ==
=== Monica Rouse - Dismissal, Reinstatement, Legal Actions ===
In the fall of 2009, Durant High School principal Monica Rouse was placed on administrative leave, beginning years of turmoil in the Durant community. Durant school officials cited a failure on Rouse's part to maintain accurate student records, a lack of professional judgement and inability to be a positive leader or role model; and the school board agreed to consider firing Rouse.[1] Rouse had the case appealed to the Iowa Board of Educational Examiners, and in March 2010 an administrative law judge issued an 86-page decision declaring Rouse should keep her job.[2] On March 30, the school board agreed to terminate high school principal Monica Rouse's contract; Iowa law allows entities such as school boards to reject administrative law judges' rulings, since they are non-binding.

Rouse appealed the Board's decision in Cedar County District court. On March 11, 2011, Judge Nancy Tabor sided with Rouse and ordered the district to reinstate her as principal, saying, "Ms. Rouse was a competent and devoted principal". The courts re-affirmed this ruling on May 11, 2011.

The Board appealed this decision to the Iowa Appellate Courts. On January 19, 2012, The Iowa Court of Appeals affirmed the district court's ruling that Rouse should get her job back. The Durant School Board appealed this to the Iowa Supreme Court. On April 11, 2012, the Iowa Supreme Court voted not to hear the appeal, affirming the lower courts decisions. [1]

The board allowed Rouse to return to active employment, but in a reduced capacity. The board placed restrictions on Rouse's access: to the building, educational records, and communication with students and staff. Rouse filed an action against the board claiming a hostile work environment asking that the board be held in contempt. On September 28, 2012, Judge Mark Smith cited the school board members for contempt for failing to restore Rouse as principal with all duties, responsibilities and privileges she enjoyed prior to the board's termination actions, and ordered the district to pay $12,000 of Rouse's legal expenses.

Other suits against the board, initiated by Rouse, were settled on December 17, 2012. The Board agreed to pay Rouse approximately $850,000 in addition to her salary and benefits from the 2009 through 2012 school years, bringing her total compensation to about $1.25 million; she also agreed to step down as principal of the high school. In addition the Board's legal representative released a statement saying, "...The legal conflict over the past few years has been an unfortunate circumstance for Mrs. Rouse and the District. The Board acknowledges that a prior press release regarding this matter may have contained inaccurate information. The Board takes this opportunity to recognize Monica Rouse as a dedicated and qualified school administrator.” The settlement ended the three-year legal battle between Rouse and the district.

== See also ==
- Lists of school districts in the United States
- List of school districts in Iowa
