= Durand =

Durand may refer to:

== Places ==
=== United States ===
- Durand Township, Winnebago County, Illinois
- Durand, Illinois, a village
  - Durand High School (Illinois), a public high school
- Durand, Georgia, an unincorporated community
- Durand, Kansas, an unincorporated community
- Durand, Michigan, a city
- Durand Township, Minnesota
- Durand, Virginia, an unincorporated community
- Durand (town), Wisconsin
  - Durand, Wisconsin, a city located within the town

=== Other ===
- Mont Durand, a mountain in Switzerland
- Tvarožná, Kežmarok District (Hungarian: Duránd), Slovakia, a village and municipality
- Durand Line, a poorly marked boundary between Afghanistan and Pakistan
- Durand Airfield, a World War II airfield near Port Moresby, Papua New Guinea
- Durand Stone, a basalt sculpture with cuneiform inscription in Bahrain

== People ==
- Durand (surname)
- Durand (given name)

== Other uses ==
- Éditions Durand, French music publisher
- Durand baronets, a title in the Baronetage of the United Kingdom
- Hospital Durand, Buenos Aires, Argentina
- Durand Cup, a football tournament in India

== See also ==
- Durán (disambiguation), the Hispanic version of the French surname Durand
- Durant (disambiguation)
