= SS Bernhard Blumenfeld =

History
- Name: Dalewood (1921–1923); Bernhard Blumenfeld (1923–1938); Carl Jüngst (1938–1945); Empire Durant (1945–1946); Tambov (1946–1958)
- Owner: W France, Fenwick & Co Ltd (1921–1923); B Blumenfeld Kommandit Gesellschaft auf Aktien (1923–1938); Krupp Reederei und Kohlenhandel GmbH (1938–1945); Ministry of War Transportation (1945); Ministry of Transportation (1945–1946); Soviet Government (1946–1958)
- Operator: W France, Fenwick & Co, Ltd. (1921–1923); B Blumenfeld (1923–1938); Krupp Reederei und Kohlenhandel GmbH (1938–1945); unknown manager (1945–1946); Soviet Government (1946–1958)
- Port of registry: (United Kingdom) London, England (1921–1923); (Weimar Republic) Hamburg, Germany (1923–1933); (Germany) Hamburg (1933–1945); (United Kingdom) London (1945–1946); Soviet Union (1946–1958)
- Builder: Eltringham's, Ltd.
- Launched: Sometime in 1921
- Completed: August 1921
- Out of service: 1958
- Identification: United Kingdom Official Number 146080 (1921–1923, 1945–1946); Code Letters RDSN (1923–1934); Code Letters DHCG (1934–1945); Code Letters GMQJ (1945–1946)
- Fate: Removed from all shipping registries in 1958

General characteristics
- Type: Cargo ship
- Tonnage: 2,879 GRT (1921–1945); 2,902 GRT (1945–1958); 1,675 NRT (1921–1945); 1,696 NRT (1945–1958); 4,450 DWT
- Length: 304 ft 8 in (92.86 m)
- Beam: 44 ft 1 in (13.44 m)
- Draught: 23 ft 0 in (7.01 m)
- Depth: 20 ft 5 in (6.22 m)
- Installed power: 288 nhp
- Propulsion: Triple action steam engine

SS Bernhard Blumenfeld was a 2,879 GRT cargo ship that was completed in 1921 as the SS Dalewood by Eltringham's, Ltd., Willington on Tyne, England. She was sold to a German company in 1923 and renamed the Bernhard Blumenfeld. She was sold again in 1938 and renamed the Carl Jüngst.

This ship was seized by the British Army in the port of Kiel, Germany, in May 1945 and given to the Ministry of War Transport which renamed her the Empire Durant. In 1946, she was donated to the Soviet Union and there renamed the Tambov. She was deleted from the Soviet shipping registries in 1958.

== Description ==
This ship was built in 1921 by Eltringham's, Ltd., Willington on Tyne, England.

This ship was 304 feet 8 inches (92.86 m) long, with a beam of 44 feet 1 inch (13.44 m). She had a draft of 20 feet 2 inches (6.15 m) and a draught of 23 feet 0 inches (7.01 m). She was assessed at 2,879 GRT, 1,695 NRT. Her DWT was 4,450.

This ship was propelled by a 288 nominal horsepower triple expansion steam engine that had cylinders of 23 inches (58 cm), 33 inches (84 cm) and 62 inches (160 cm) diameter by 42 inches (110 cm) stroke. The engine was built by Eltringham's.

== History ==
Dalewood was built in 1921 for W France, Fenwick & Co, Ltd., London. She was completed in August. The United Kingdom Official Number 146080 was allocated. In 1923, she was sold to the B. Blumenfeld Kommandit Gesellschaft auf Aktien, Hamburg and renamed Bernhard Blumenfeld. The Code Letters RDSN were allocated and her port of registry was Hamburg. With the change of Code Letters in 1934, she was allocated DHCG.

In 1938, the Bernhard Blumenfeld was sold to the Krupp Reederei und Kohlenhandel GmbH, Essen and renamed the Carl Jüngst. Her Code Letters and port of registry remained unchanged. In May 1945, the Carl Jüngst was seized by the British Army at Kiel, Germany. Declared a war prize, she was passed to the MoWT and renamed the SS Empire Durant. She regained her Official Number 146080 and was allocated the Code Letters GMQJ. She was assessed as 2,902 GRT, 1,696 NRT. In 1946, the Empire Durant was donated to the Soviet Union. She was renamed the Tambov, serving as the mother ship for Soviet fishing fleets. In May 1950, the Tambov, along with 30 trawlers, called at Mount's Bay, Cornwall, for refueling. This fleet was on a voyage from the Baltic Sea to the Black Sea, where they were to fish for sprats. Tambov was deleted from shipping registers in 1958.
