= West Newton Village Center Historic District =

Historic district in Massachusetts, United States

- U.S. National Register of Historic Places
- U.S. Historic district
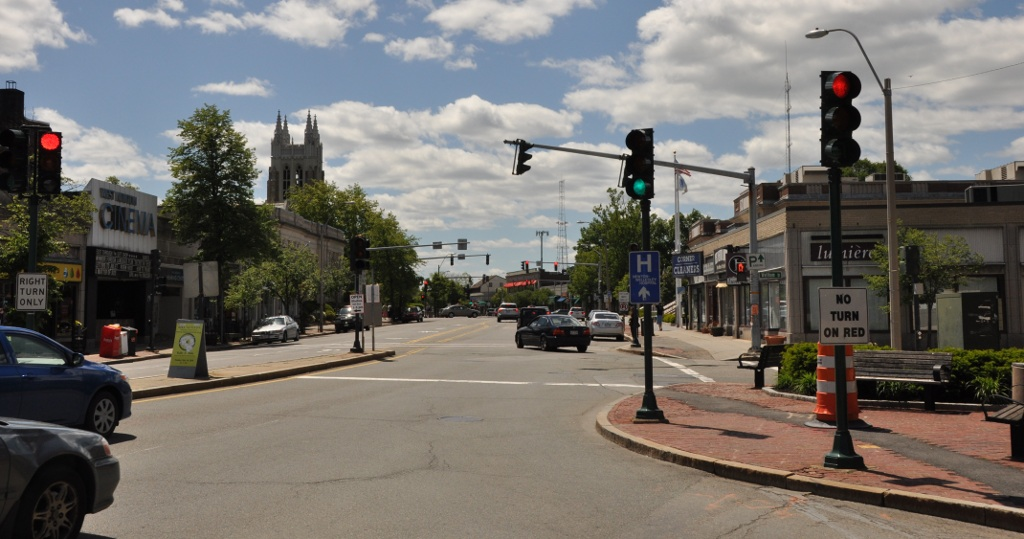

- Location within Massachusetts Location within the United States
- Location: Roughly Washington Street from Putnam to Davis Court, West Newton, Massachusetts
- Coordinates: 42.34944°N 71.22634°W
- NRHP reference No.: 90000017
- Added to NRHP: March 16, 1990

The West Newton Village Center Historic District encompasses the heart of the village of West Newton, in the city of Newton, Massachusetts in the United States. It extends along Washington Street between Lucas Court in the west and Davis Court in the east, and includes a few properties on immediately adjacent side streets, including Watertown Street and Waltham Street. The village is the second-largest of Newton's commercial centers (after Newton Corner) and is the best-preserved of its late 19th and early 20th century village centers. The district was listed on the National Register of Historic Places in 1990.

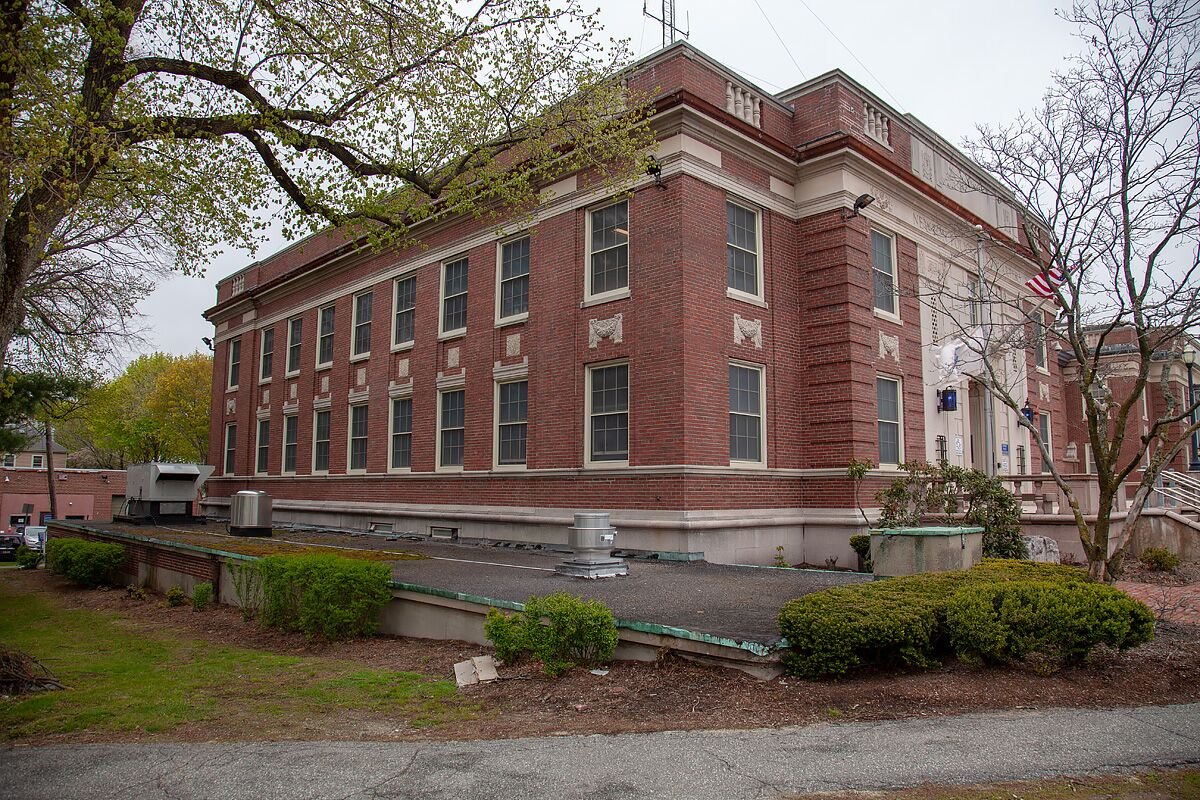
Newton Police Headquarters (1931). Photo by John Borchard

This section of Washington Street was first laid out in the 1690s, alongside John Fuller's 1000-acre farm. The earliest structure still standing is the house of Dr. Samuel Warren (1716) on Cherry Street; originally a block away on Washington Street, the house was built by William Williams, a cousin of the founder of Williams College. The growth of the village continued with the arrival of Congregationalists, and the establishment of the Second Church in Newton in 1764, splitting off from the first Congregational church in Newton Center. An old nickname for West Newton, "Squash End", arose from that period. Soon thereafter the West Parish Burying Ground was established, where graves of some of the early settlers of the village are found; this is one of three early cemeteries in Newton. In 1781, the Second (or West) Parish was officially incorporated.

Washington Street was from the early days a major east-west road. The railroad was constructed alongside it, opening in West Newton in 1834, which became a stop on the Boston and Albany line. Coaches connected West Newton to Waltham to the north and Newton Lower Falls to the south. The availability of transport spurred development of the area.

One of the oldest buildings in the district is the Railroad Hotel, also known as the Davis Tavern, built in 1831 by entrepreneur, educator and civic leader Seth Davis, and now serving as a retail and office space. Here, on April 7, 1834, the directors of the Boston and Worcester Railroad and 50 guests, gathered at the Davis Tavern to celebrate their first train journey coming west from Boston. From that time, the train brought suburban commuters to West Newton.

Seth Davis had arrived in Newton in 1802, built his house nearby on Eden Avenue, founded a school, and planted thousands of trees throughout the neighborhood. Photographs remain of the widely-attended celebration of his 100th birthday in 1887, and several nearby streets are named after him. The Railroad Hotel was designated a Newton City Landmark in 2019.

West Newton became a nexus of educational reform in the mid-19th century. The presence of the Normal School, or teaching training college, founded by leading educational reformer Horace Mann and led by Reverend Cyrus Peirce, attracted more families to the area. It is thought to be the first college for women in the United States. Nathaniel Topliff Allen (1823-1903) was invited by Horace Mann to head the West Newton English and Classical School where the teachers in training could practice their new methods. The Allen school was far ahead of its time, emphasizing experiential learning, and welcoming all races in co-educational classrooms. The Allen homestead nearby at 35 Webster Street, dates to 1841. The house was later expanded and opened by his daughters as a school where they continued a progressive approach to education. This building, a structure in the Greek Revival style with an impressive columned front, is documented as a stop on the Underground Railroad and is a Newton City Landmark.

Elizabeth Palmer Peabody (1804-1894), who is credited with her strong advocacy for kindergartens and other educational innovations, lived on Temple Street on West Newton Hill in 1850-51. Her sister, Mary Peabody, was the wife of Horace Mann; the Mann family had their home at 155 Chestnut Street (since demolished) and hosted Nathaniel Hawthorne and his wife Sophia Peabody. Reverend Henry Lambert, living at 128 Chestnut Street, was a strong voice for abolition along with his daughter Mary T. Lambert and son-in-law William Francis Allen. The Lamberts had many guests at their house including Ralph Waldo Emerson. These individuals and other West Newton residents met frequently in a reading and discussion society called the Athenaeum.

From 1848 to 1931, West Newton served as the civic center for Newton. The town hall was formerly located on the site of what is now Captain John Ryan Park, at the corner of Washington and Cherry Streets. The town offices took over the former building of the Congregational church modifying it to serve the civic needs. This was designated City Hall once Newton was large enough to be officially declared a city in the 1870s. West Newton remains the location of the city's police headquarters and a local district courthouse. Both are housed in Classical Revival buildings built in 1931 on Washington Street, and designed by the architect James Ritchie.

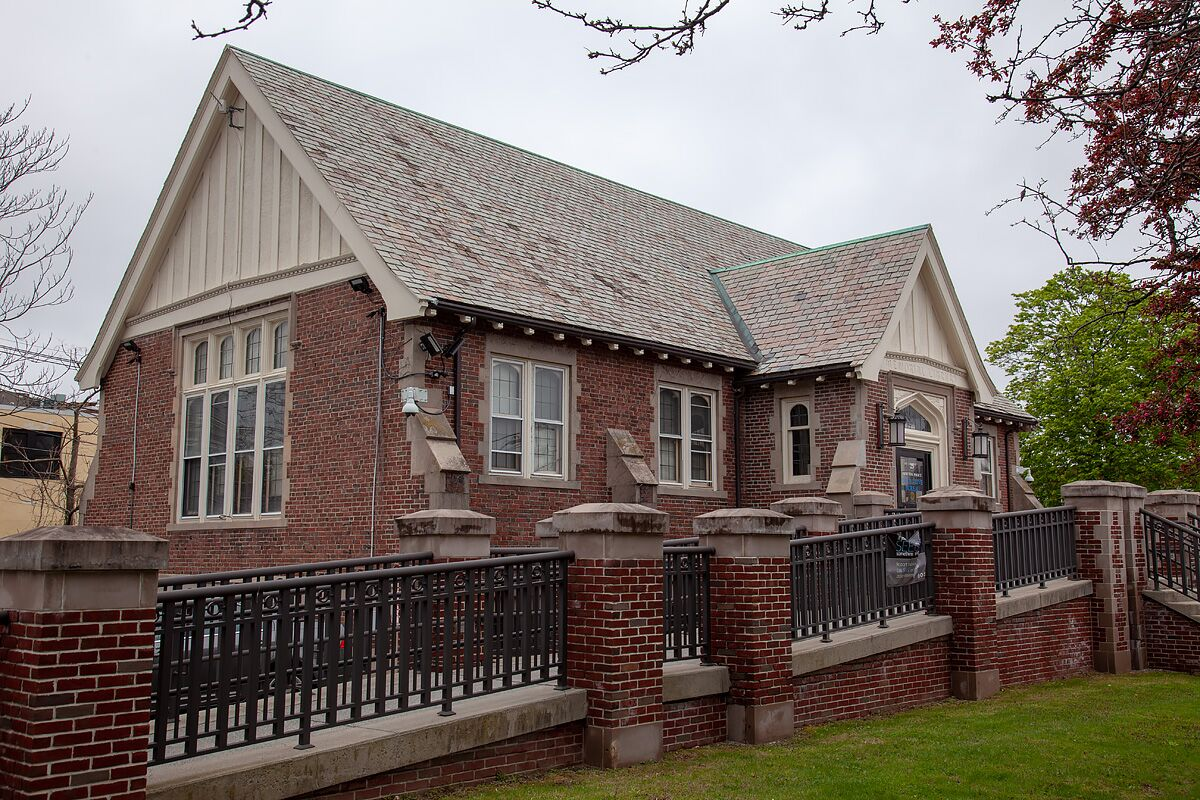
West Newton Memorial Library (1926). Photo by John Borchard

The original West Newton Branch Library at 25 Chestnut Street is a Tudor Revival structure built in 1926 with funds raised by community subscription. Over the front door carved in the stone lintel are the words "Memorial Library". The building has now been re-purposed as an annex to the city police headquarters on Washington Street.

One church remains in the village center, that of the First Unitarian Universalist Society in Newton. It is a Gothic Revival structure designed by the prominent architectural firm of Cram, Goodhue & Ferguson and built in 1905. Prior to the completion of this building, the Unitarians met in several other buildings in West Newton, including the Railroad Hotel.

The congregational church, the Second Church of Newton, was originally located on Washington Street, next to the city hall. Then in 1916 construction was completed of a significant Gothic Revival sanctuary with stained glass windows and a tall ornamented spire at 60 Highland Street, just south of the village center. Two other houses of worship, located to the west of the village center, have had important roles in the history of West Newton. The Myrtle Baptist Church at 21 Curve Street has been a center for a thriving African-American community since the 1870s. St. Bernard's Church and Rectory at 1515-29 Washington Street, a Catholic church, is a Newton City Landmark.

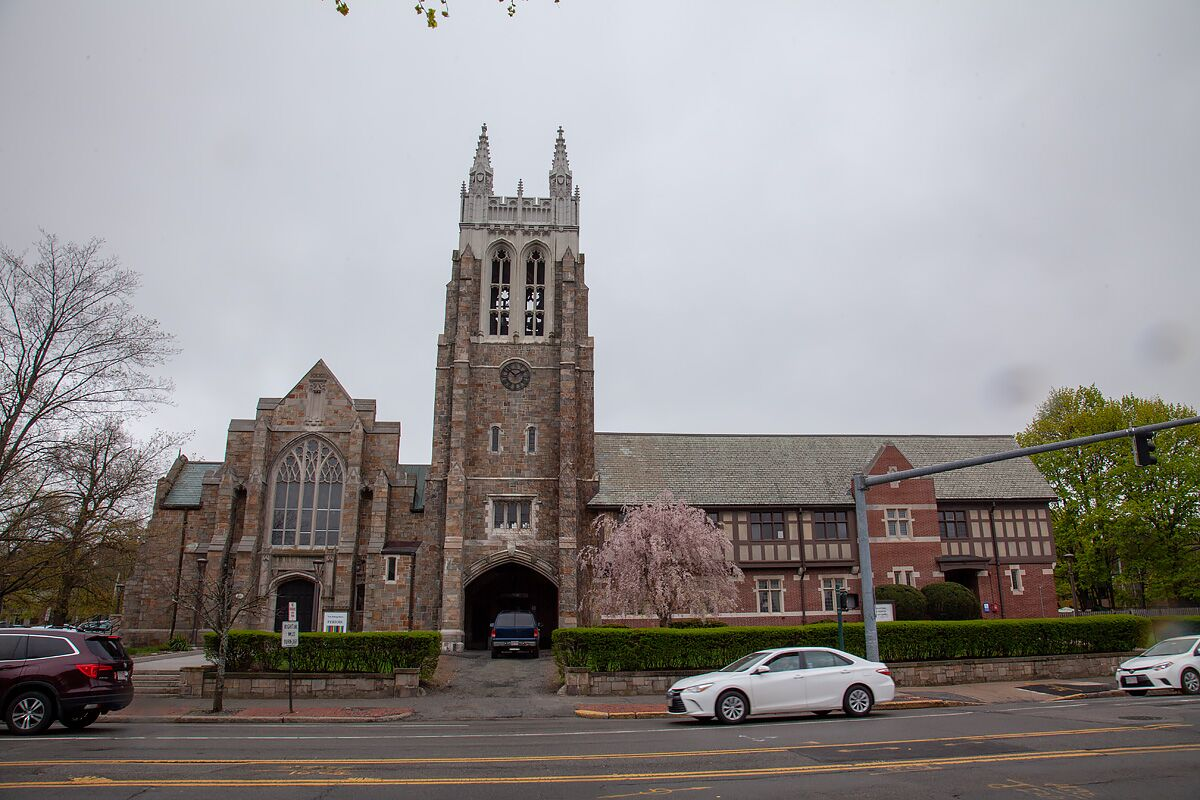
First Unitarian Church (1905). Photo by John Borchard.

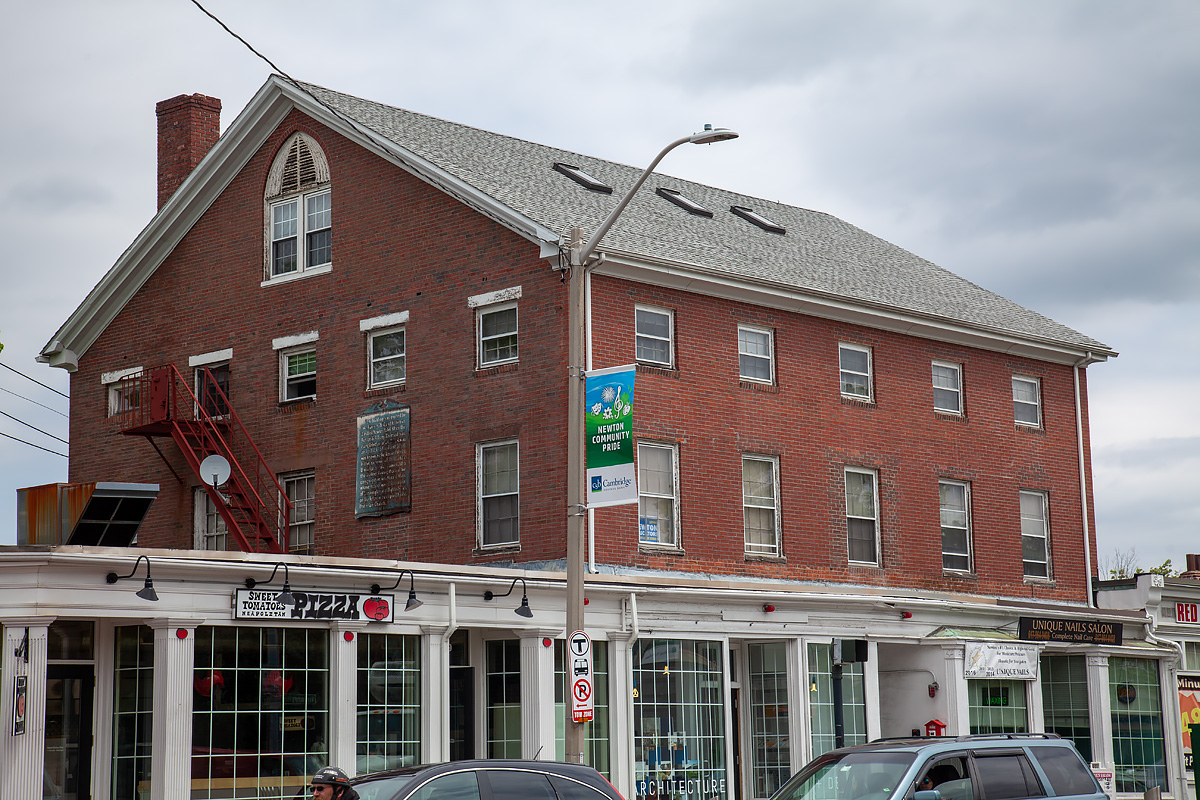
Railroad Hotel (1831). Photo by John Borchard.

The Robinson Block, at 989-1001 Washington Street, is the only large commercial building remaining from the 19th century. Dating to 1875, this substantial brick building features balanced massing and detailed ornamentation with elaborate brick work and incised floral patters cut into the stone over the windows. It has had many uses since then and now houses a pharmacy on the street level.

Two bank buildings also contribute to the collection of distinctive architectural elements in the village. The one-story store fronts on both side of Washington Street have a decorative cast stone decoration in the design of a rope on either side of each shop. The buildings on the south side also feature a marbleized transom.

Other National Register historic districts immediately to the south of the village center include the Putnam Street Historic District and the West Newton Hill Historic District . Both were developed as West Newton grew as a commercial, transport and intellectual center in the late 19th century and feature an unusual level of integrity of the original residential architecture from that period.

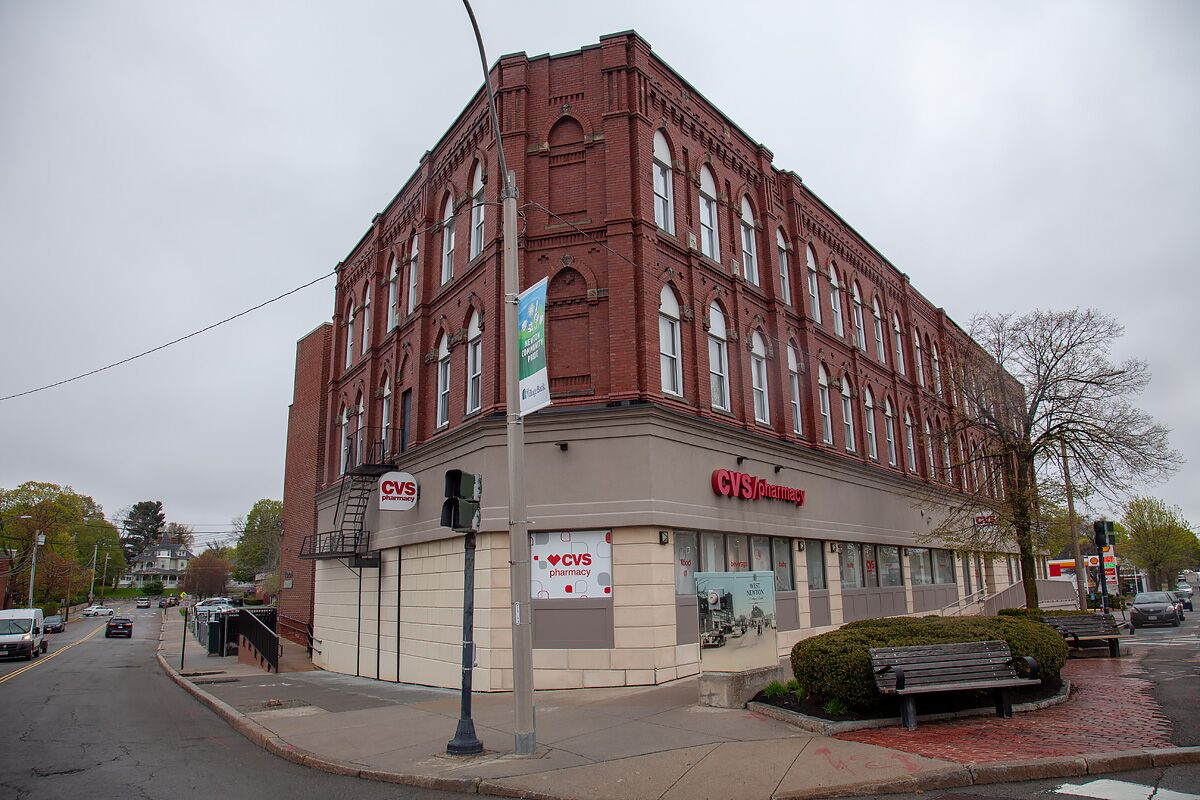
Robinson's Block (1875). Photo by John Borchard.

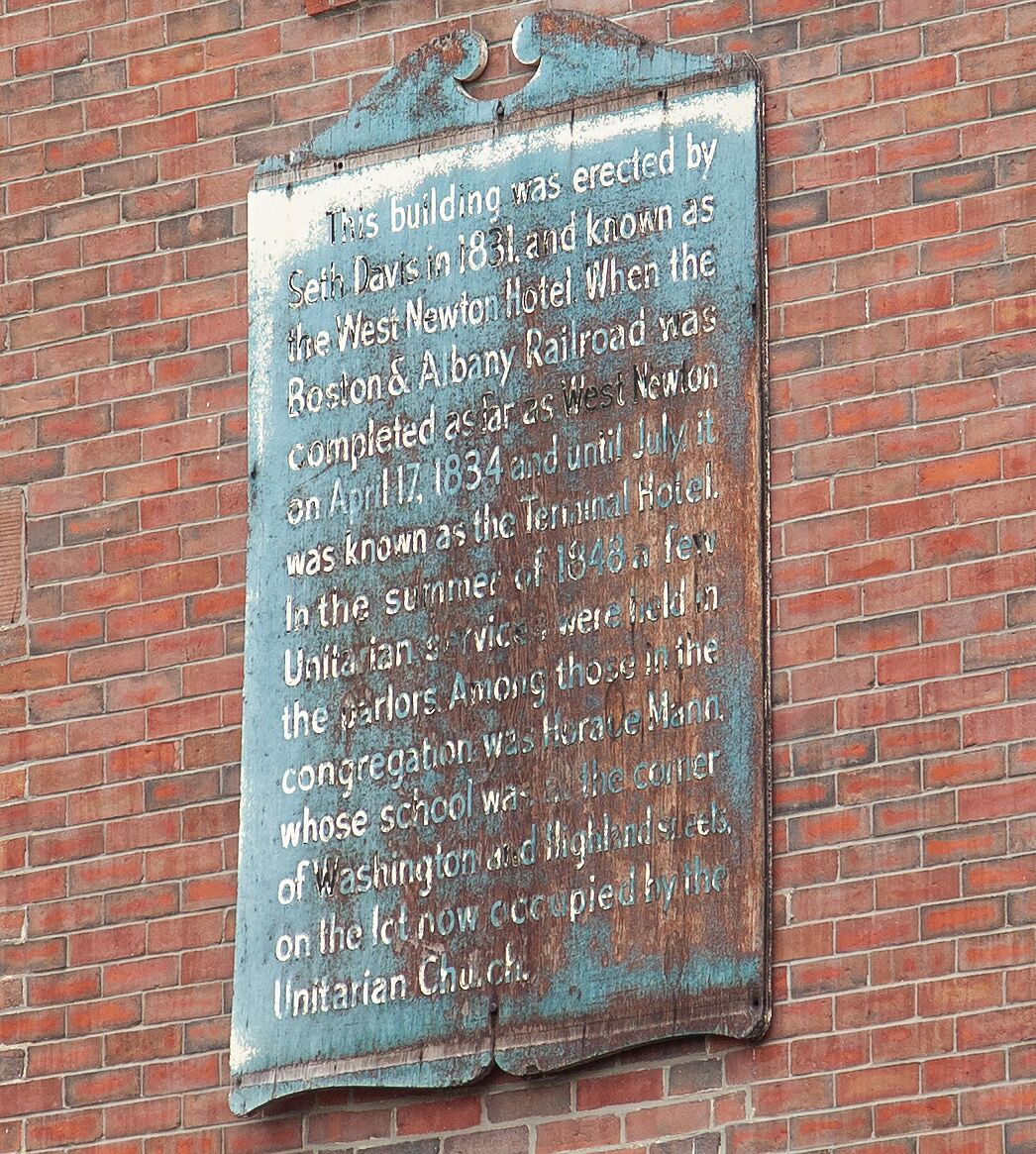
History of the Railroad Hotel

== See also ==
- National Register of Historic Places listings in Newton, Massachusetts
