= West Newton, Massachusetts =

Village in Massachusetts, United States

Coordinates: 42°21′N 71°14′W

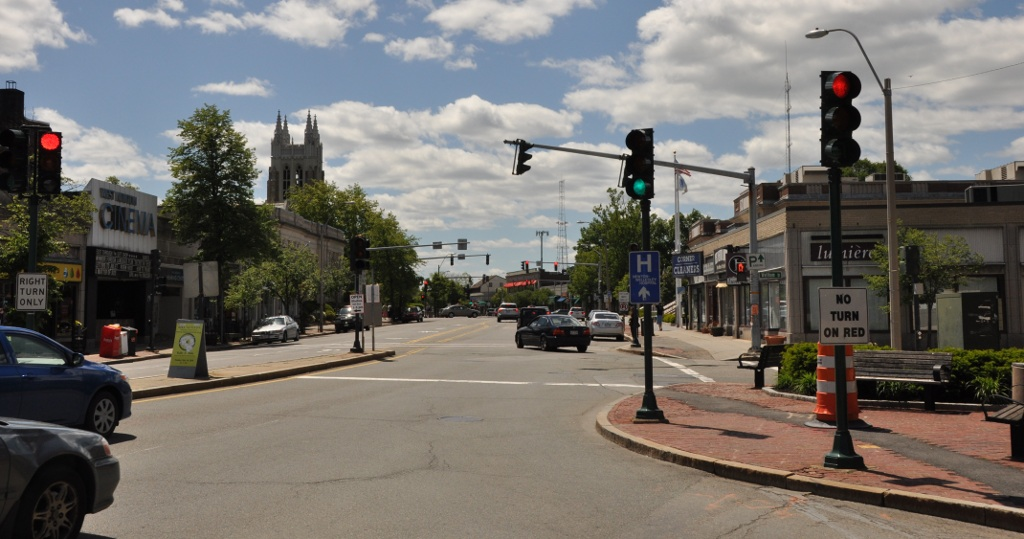
West Newton Village Center

West Newton is one of the thirteen villages within the city of Newton in Middlesex County, Massachusetts, United States.

Among the oldest of the thirteen Newton villages, the West Newton Village Center is a National Register Historic District. The postal ("Zip") code 02465 roughly matches the village limits.

== Location ==
West Newton is located in the north central part of Newton and is bordered by the town of Waltham on the north and by the villages of Auburndale on the west, Newton Lower Falls on the extreme southwest, Newtonville on the east, and Waban on the south.

== West Newton Square ==
The town center, West Newton Square, is home to many local businesses and venues. These include the historic West Newton Cinema, the Davis Railroad Hotel, the Robinson Block, the Newton Bank Building and many more.

Many popular restaurants are located in West Newton, ranging from the more upscale Bluebird Cafe and Ninebark to Sweet Tomatoes Pizza, and Paddy's public house. Blue Ribbon Bar-B-Q is another local favorite, and attracts fans from far and wide.

There are several civic buildings in West Newton Square. They include the Newton Police Department and the local courthouse, both located on Washington Street, as well as the Chinese Community Center on Elm Street. The square once had a branch of the Newton Free Library as well as the Davis Elementary School on Waltham Street. Both closed in the 1980s owing to municipal financial constraints. The library building on Chestnut Street is now a police annex, while the school operates as a community center.

In 2016, a man in a pick up truck crashed into the Sweet Tomatoes restaurant in the historic Davis Railroad Hotel earning him four years in prison, a long-term license suspension and resulting in the deaths of two people. Today, there are sturdy metal posts along the sidewalk in front of the building, in hopes of preventing further damage to West Newton Square's oldest freestanding building.

=== West Newton Cinema ===
The West Newton Cinema is a small local cinema first opened in 1937, and designed by architects Krokyn & Browne of the Boston-based architectural firm Krokyn, Browne & Rosenstein. The theatre was owned by the M&P Theatre companies, whom also owned the present-day Boch Center in Boston. The theatre originally had a grand cut-stone facade and red and gold marquee.

In 1967, the theatre was converted from a single movie-house to three which saved the theatre from demolition. By 1977, the theatre was seeing leaks and other issues. In 1978, the original marquee, which had been deteriorating for some time, was removed and replaced. In 1990, the theatre was expanded to a six screen theatre and some of its original art deco elements were restored.

In July 2022, plans were made to have the theatre sold to a development company for demolition and transformation into an apartment building. Locals soon fought back however, protesting its destruction. A group called the West Newton Cinema Foundation was created to raise money to purchase the theatre. The group needed to raise 5.6 million dollars by late August 2024. On August 27, 2024, this deadline was met and the cinema was saved from its unwelcome demise.

As of November 2025, the West Newton Cinema shows independent films in addition to popular mainstream films. Ty Burr is a popular regular, hosting classic movie nights and showing innovative, experimental films. In March 2025, audio services and closed caption services were added for those with visual and hearing impairments. In August 2025, the West Newton Cinema Foundation celebrated its first birthday with free movies all day.

=== Losses due to turnpike construction ===
- West Newton Fire House, Washington Street
- West Newton Boston and Albany Railroad Station
- Lincoln Park, Washington Street, although the Lincoln Park Baptist Church, where Martin Luther King Jr. once preached, still exists.
- The Curve Street neighborhood, originally settled by freed slaves before the Civil War and still inhabited by many black families and the largely black Myrtle Baptist Church, was considerably reduced in size.
- Tony's drug store. Tony moved the business to a corner location out of the way of the turnpike, but to the detriment of the old-fashioned atmosphere. The new place was called the Newtondale Pharmacy.
- The Block: at Washington St. and Davis Court. 1st floor was store fronts; the upper floors were apartments. When you went around to the back you could see all the back porches which overlooked a lot with railroad cars and Border Street.
- Davis Ct: still exists as completely commercial, however, the houses scattered on the land are all gone; 5 Davis Court was a duplex.

== Transportation ==
The village is served by West Newton station on the Framingham/Worcester Line of the MBTA Commuter Rail system, as well as by MBTA bus routes 505, 553, and 554.

West Newton also has easy access to the Massachusetts Turnpike and Route 128 (Massachusetts)/I-95. The Massachusetts Turnpike (Interstate 90) runs through West Newton. Routes 30 and 16 also pass through the West Newton.

== Places on the National Register of Historic Places ==
- Arthur F. Luke House: 221 Prince St. (added March 16, 1990)
- Brae-Burn Historic District: Brae Burn and Windmere Rds. (added March 16, 1990)
- C. A. Sawyer House (Second): 86 Waban Ave. (added March 16, 1990)
- C. G. Howes Dry Cleaning-Carley Real Estate: 1173 Washington St. (added March 16, 1990)
- Charles D. Elliott House: 7 Colman St. (added October 4, 1986)
- Charles W. Noyes House: 271 Chestnut St. (added March 16, 1990)
- Charles Maynard House: 459 Crafts St. (added May 4, 1996)
- Day Estate Historic District: Commonwealth Ave. and Dartmouth St. (added March 16, 1990)
- Dr. Samuel Warren House: 432 Cherry St. (added February 3, 1985)
- First Unitarian Society in Newton: 1326 Washington St. (added October 4, 1986)
- Galen Merriam House: 102 Highland St. (added October 4, 1986)
- George W. Eddy House: 85 Bigelow Rd. (added March 16, 1990)
- House at 170 Otis Street: 170 Otis St. (added October 4, 1986)
- Levi Warren Jr. High School: 1600 Washington St. (added March 16, 1990)
- Nathaniel Topliff Allen Homestead: 25 Webster St. (added February 9, 1978)
- Peirce School: 88 Chestnut St. (added 1979)
- Railroad Hotel: 1273-1279 Washington St. (added October 4, 1986)
- Second Church in Newton: 60 Highland St. (added March 16, 1990)
- Webster Park Historic District: Along Webster Pk. and Webster St. between Westwood St. and Oak Ave. (added October 4, 1986)
- West Newton Hill Historic District: Roughly bounded by Highland Ave., Lenox, Hampshire, and Chestnut Sts. (added October 4, 1986)
- West Newton Village Center Historic District: Roughly Washington St. from Putnam to Davis Ct. (added March 16, 1990)
- West Parish Burying Ground: River and Cherry Sts. (added December 13, 2004)
- Windsor Road Historic District: Windsor and Kent Rds. (added March 16, 1990)

Fourteen of these are pictured below.

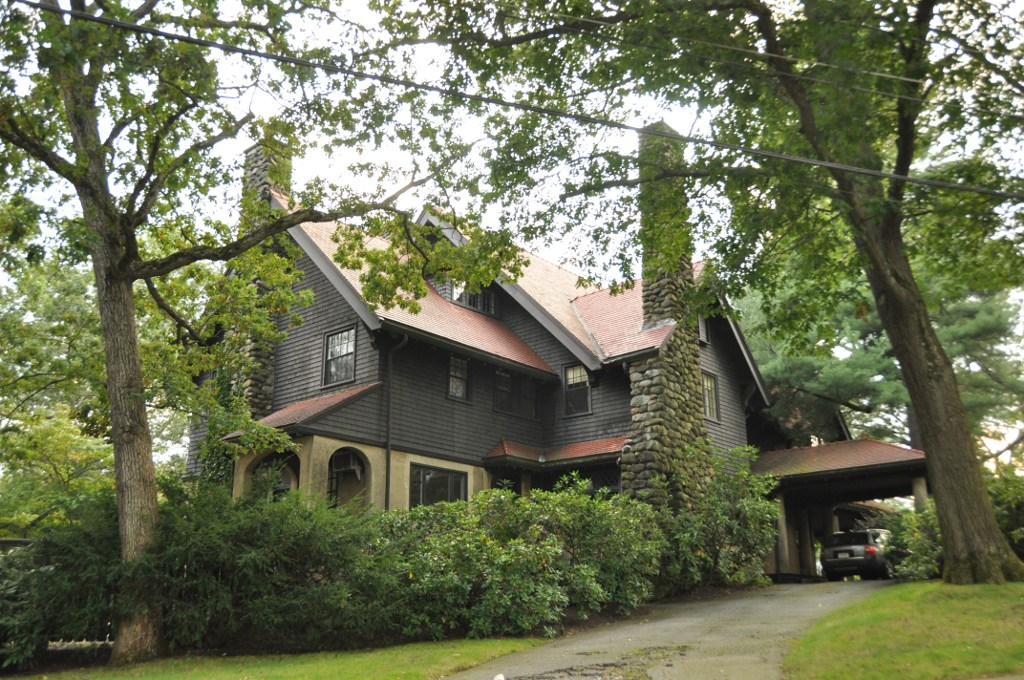
Arthur F Luke House

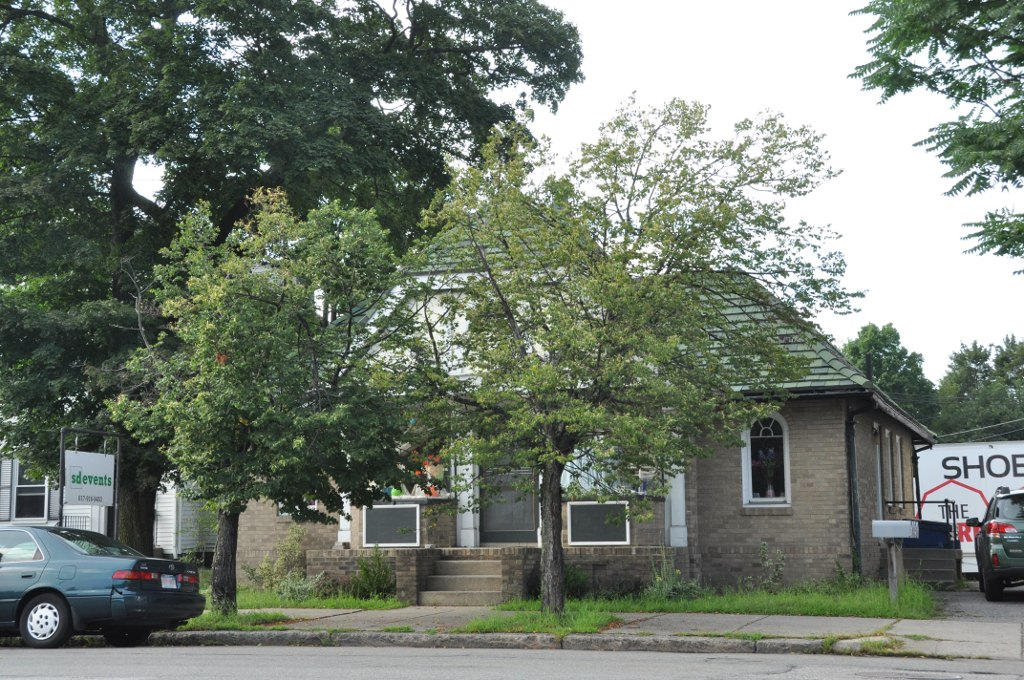
C G Howes Dry Cleaning - Carley Real Estate

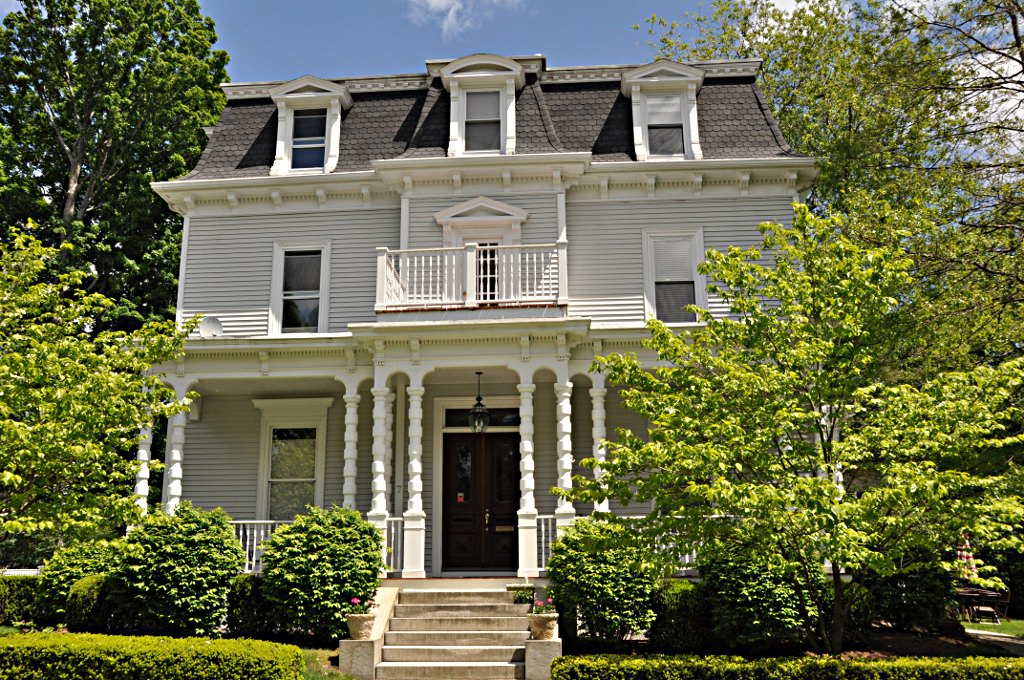
Charles D Elliott House

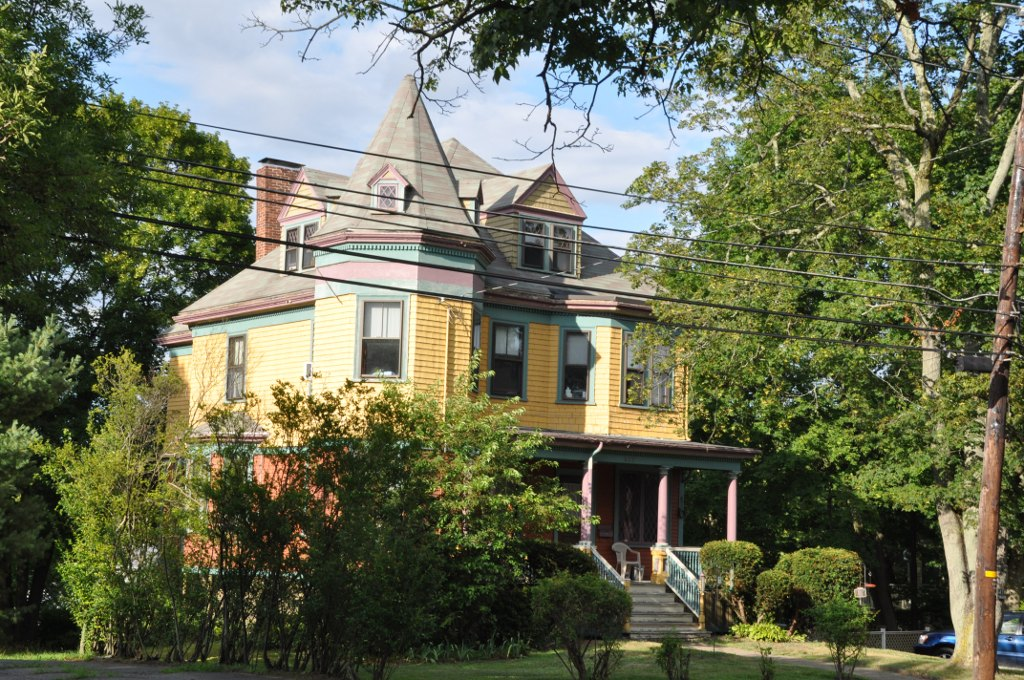
Charles Maynard House

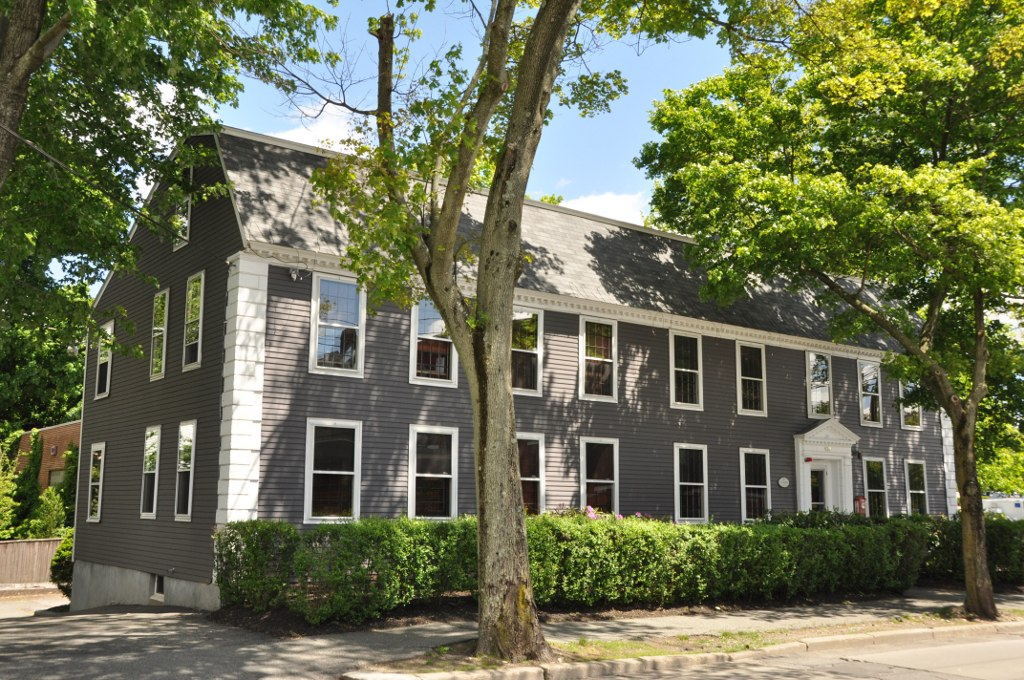
Dr Samuel Warren House

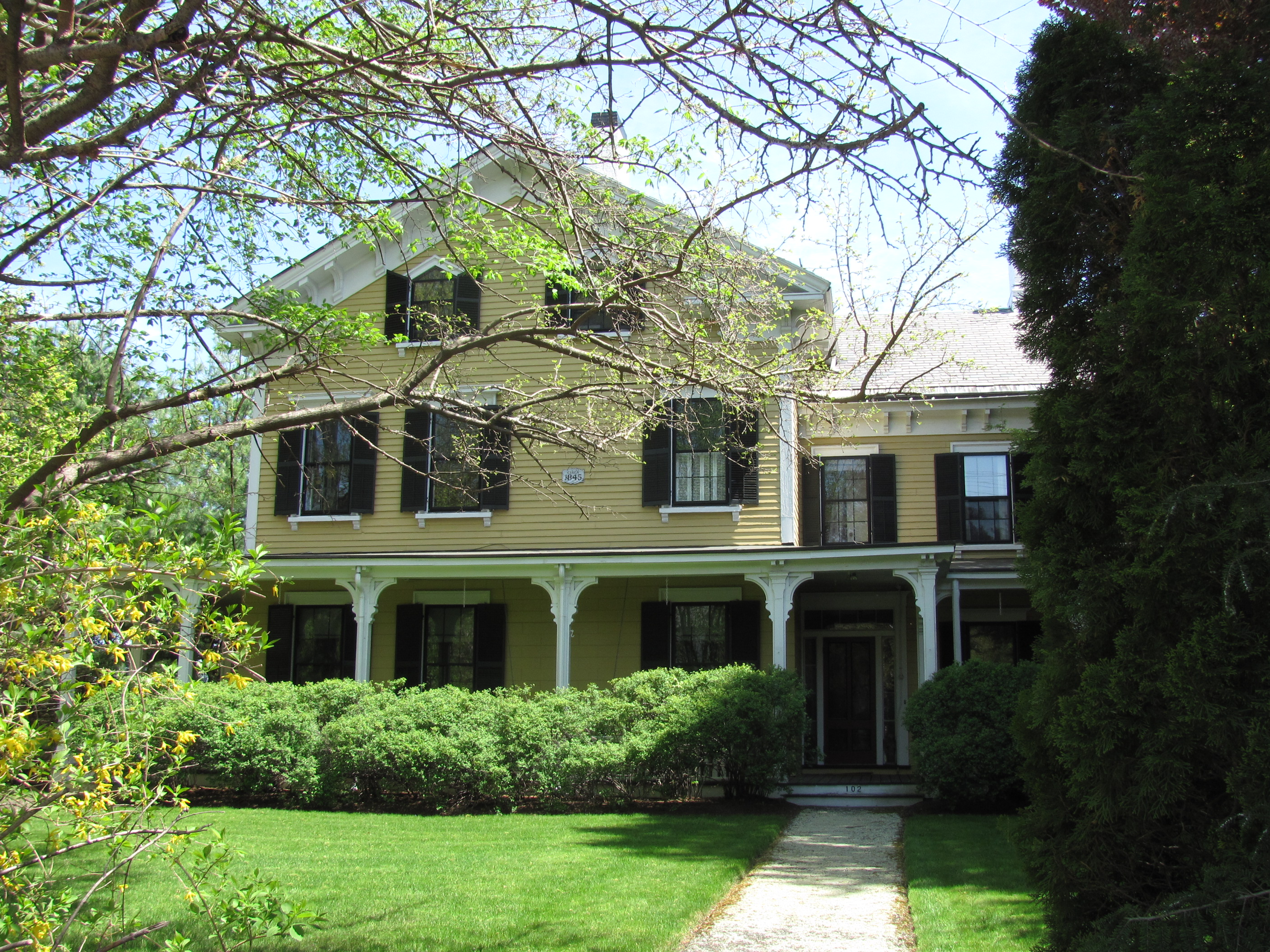
Galen Merriam House

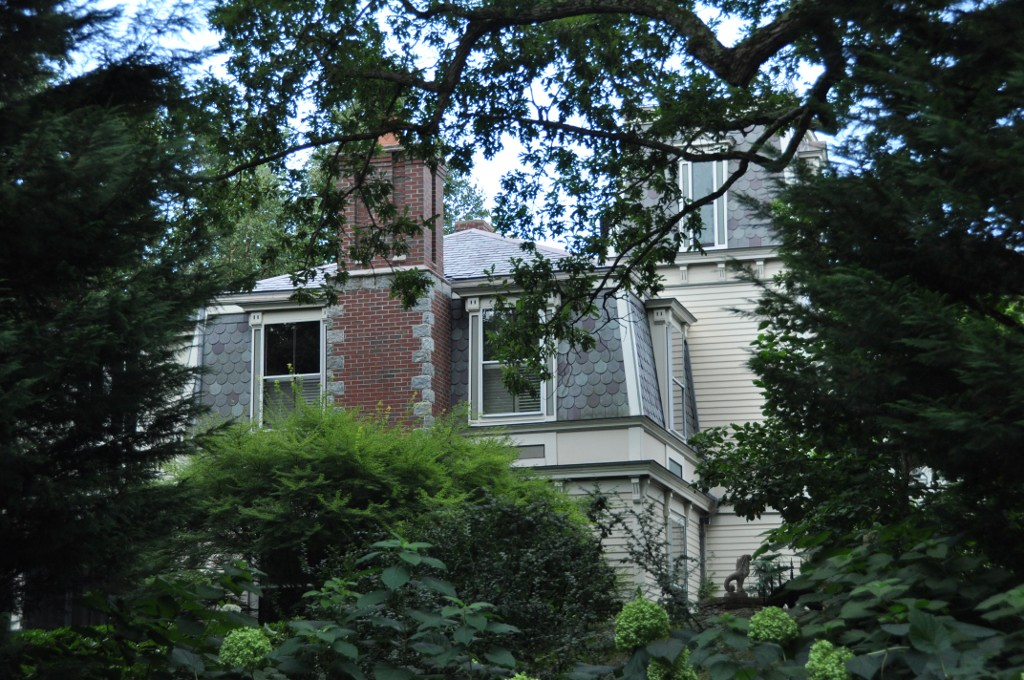
170 Otis Street

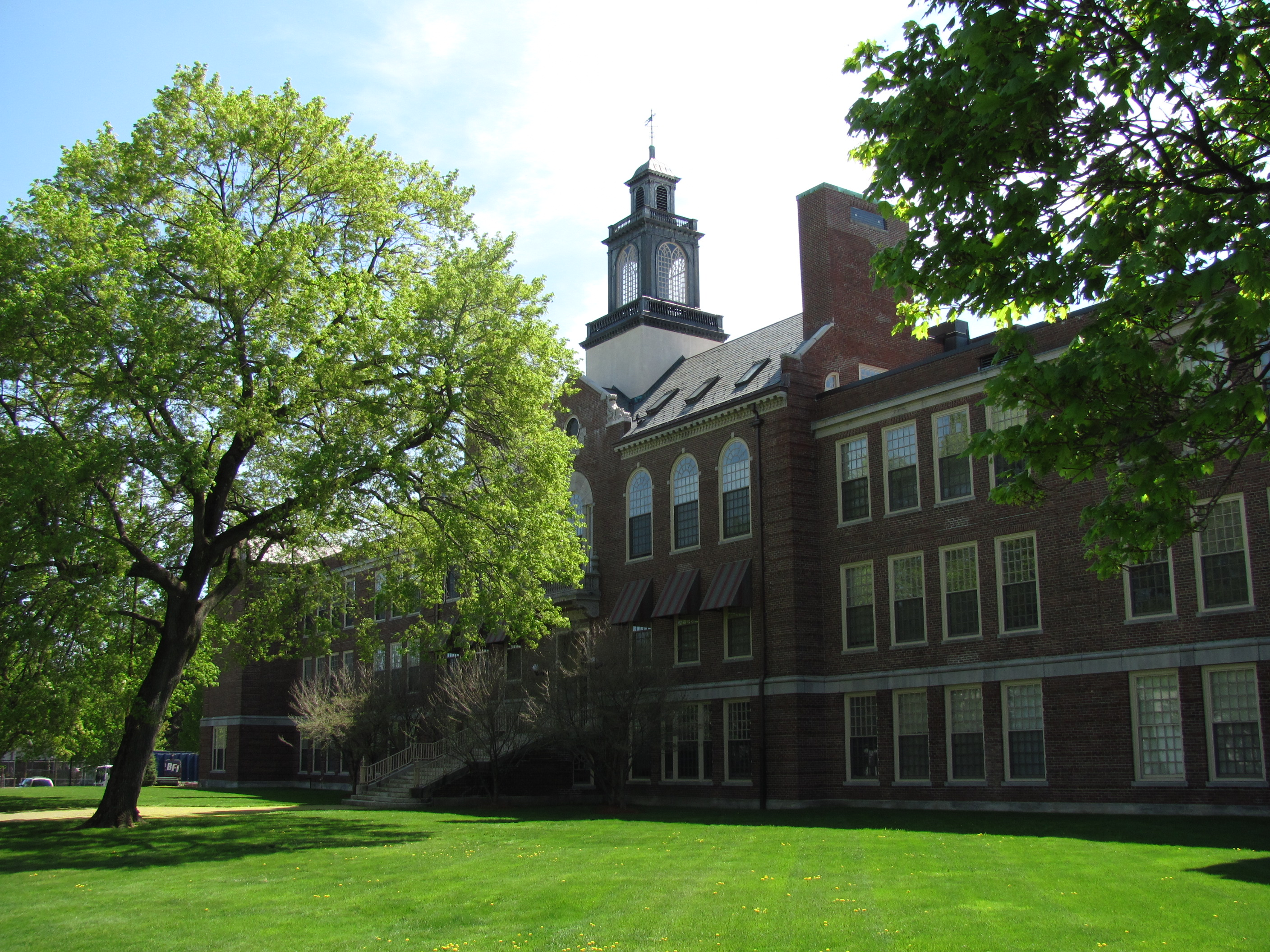
Levi F Warren Jr High School

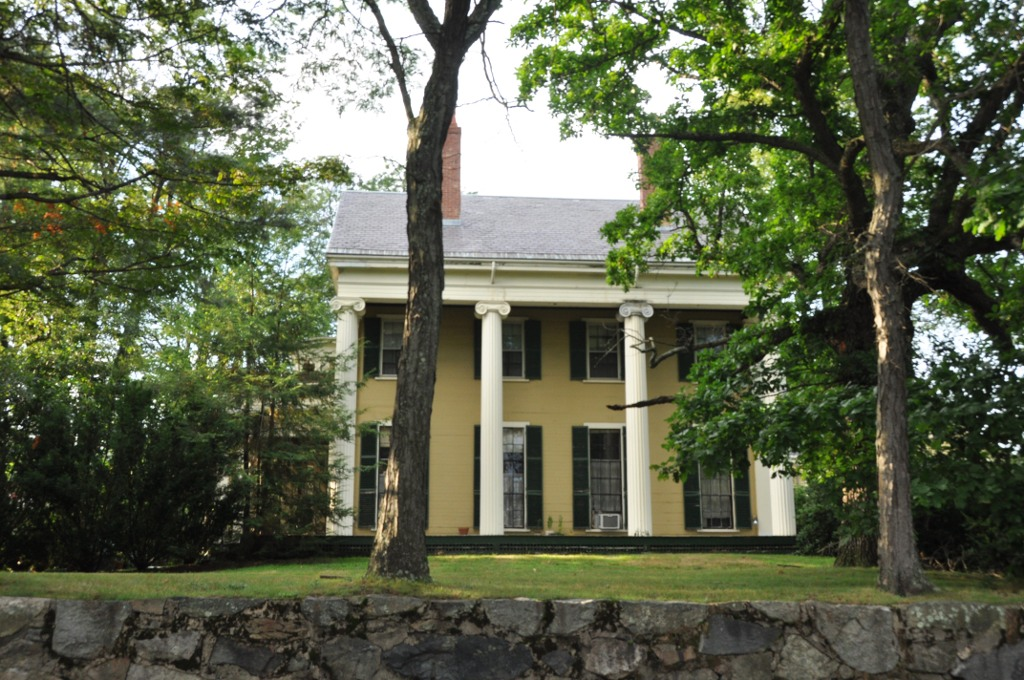
Nathaniel Topliff Allen Homestead

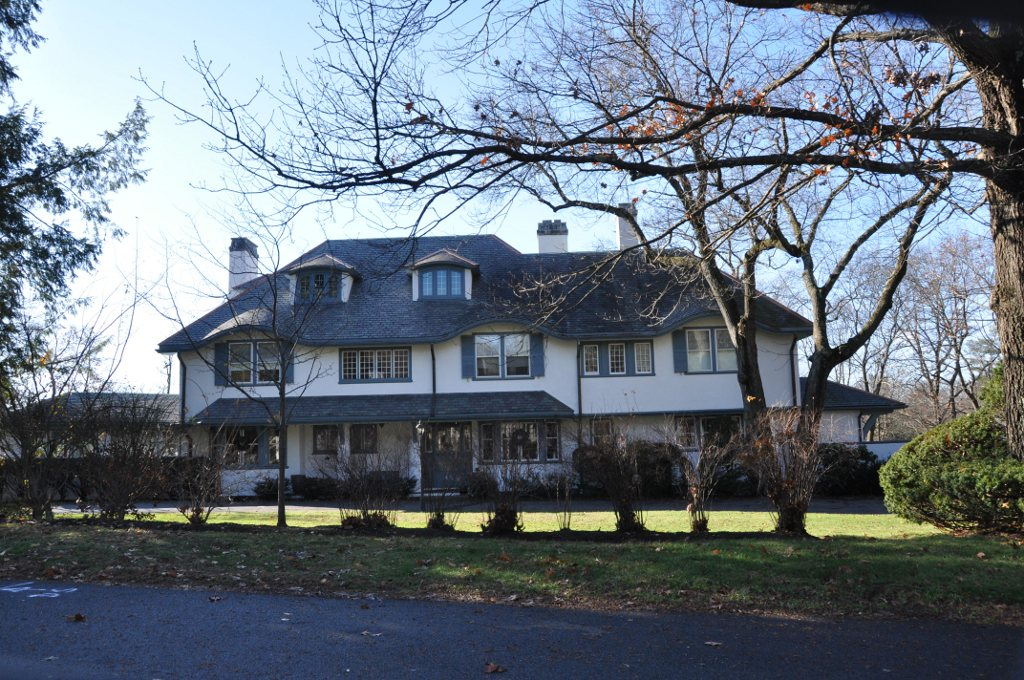
George W Eddy House

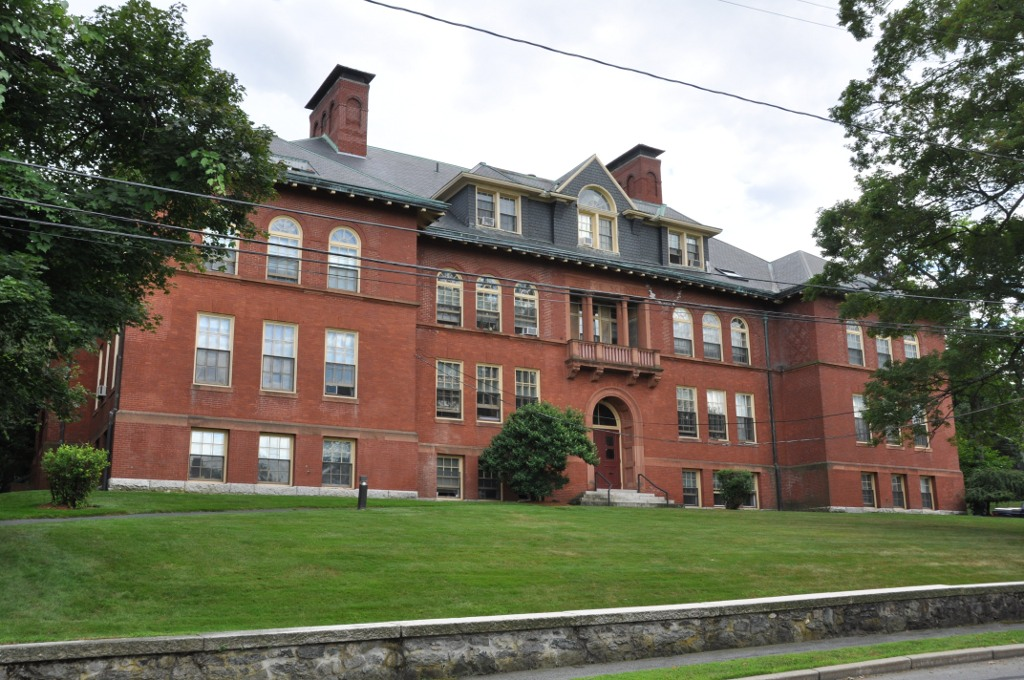
Peirce School

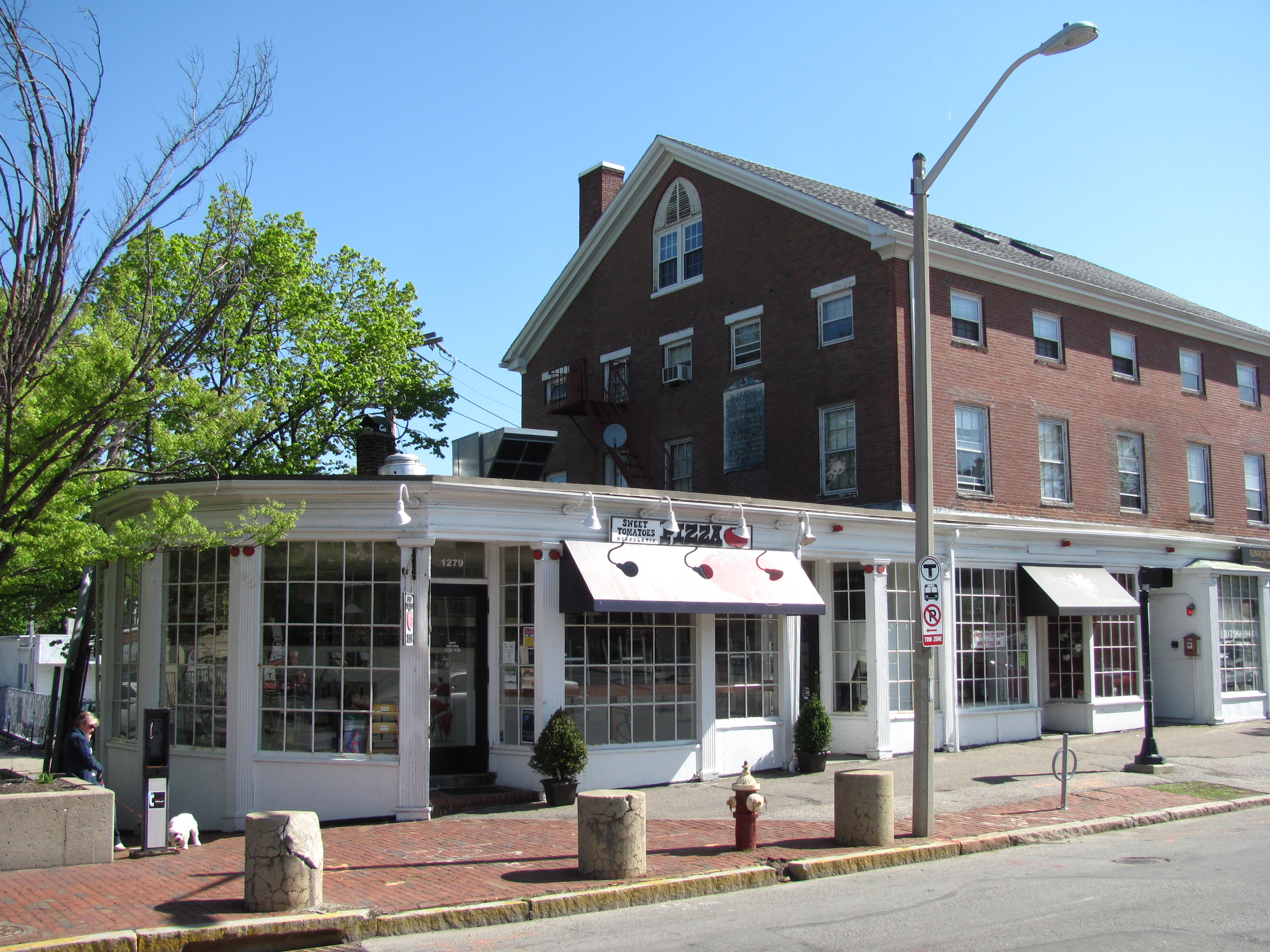
Railroad Hotel

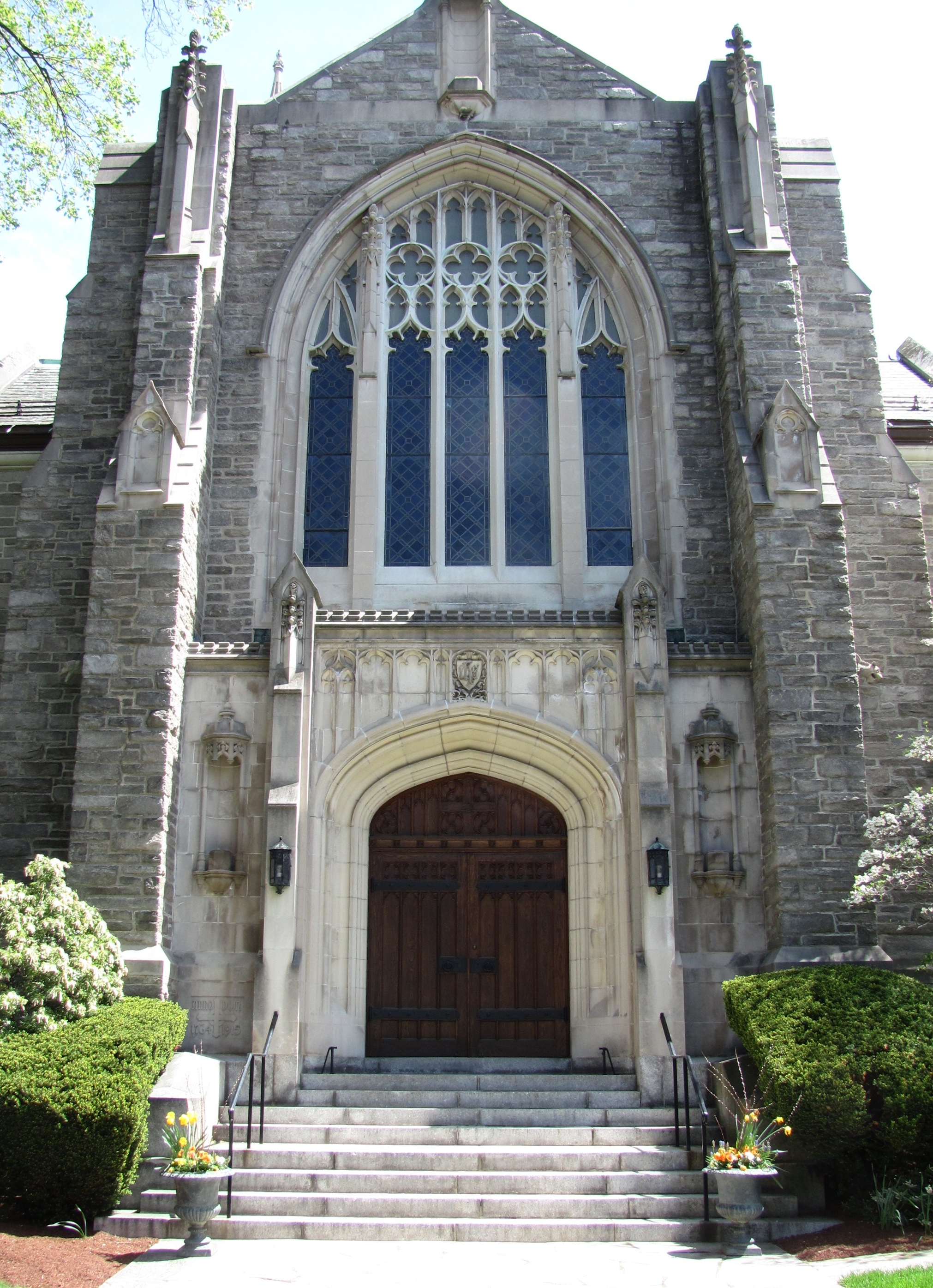
Second Church

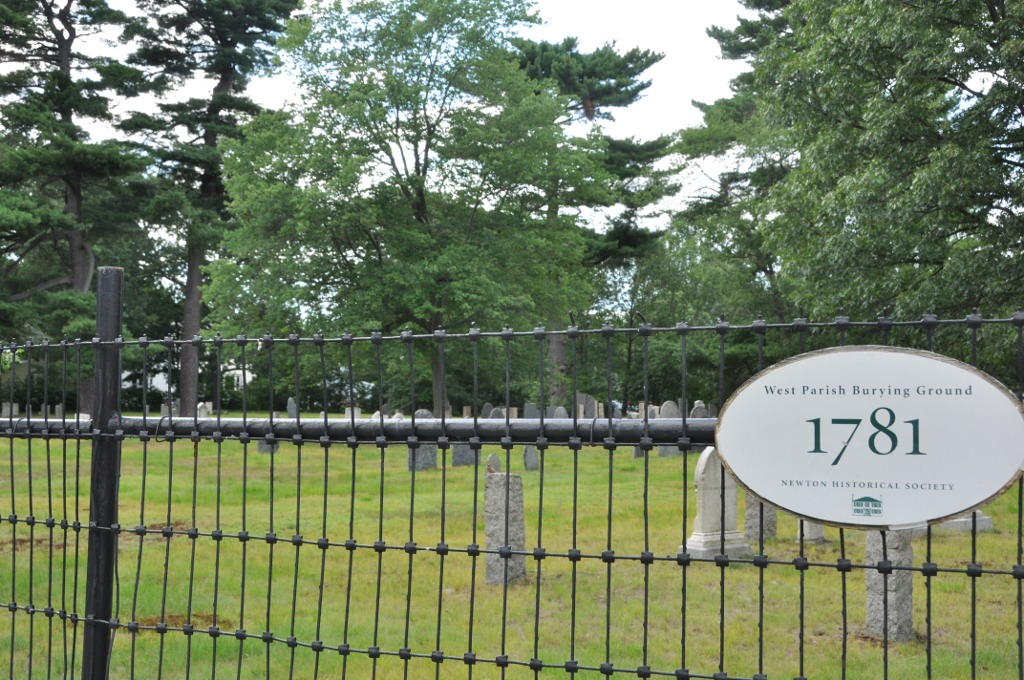
West Parish Burying Ground

== Notable people ==
- Mitch Albom, author
- Isaac Asimov, science fiction author of I, Robot
- Sheldon Brown, bicycle mechanic and technical authority
- Richard B. Carter native and lifelong resident of West Newton, head of Carter's Ink Company from 1905 to 1949, lived at 11 Forest Ave. WN
- Matt Damon, actor, first made famous from Good Will Hunting
- Bette Davis, actress
- Joe DeNucci
- Ralph Waldo Emerson, essayist, lecturer and author
- Mickey Fisher (1904/05–1963), basketball coach
- Nathaniel Hawthorne, Sophia Peabody Hawthorne, Julian Hawthorne, and Rose Hawthorne
- Steven Hyman, neuroscientist and Provost of Harvard University
- Julian Jaynes, psychologist, professor, writer
- John Krasinski
- Timothy Leary, Harvard professor and LSD researcher
- Matt LeBlanc, actor most widely known as Joey in Friends
- Jack Lemmon, actor
- Constance McCashin, actress, Knots Landing
- Mark Mahoney, tattoo artist, owner of Shamrock Social Club in Los Angeles, whose celebrity clients include Johnny Depp, Angelina Jolie
- David Mamet, playwright, screenwriter and film director
- Mark Mancuso, meteorologist The Weather Channel (United States)
- Horace Mann
- Olga C. Nardone, Wizard Of Oz Munchkin "1939" (Villager, SleepyHead, Middle Lullaby League) 6/8/1921—9/24/2010 10 Bellevue Street
- Don Nottebart, MLB player
- Cyrus Peirce, for whom Peirce School is named
- Osgood Perkins, actor, father of Anthony Perkins
- Rebecca Pidgeon, film actress who is married to David Mamet
- Seth Putnam, leader from noisecore band Anal Cunt
- Morrie Schwartz, subject of the best-selling book Tuesdays With Morrie
- Harriet Beecher Stowe, author of Uncle Tom's Cabin
- Edward Wagenknecht, American literary critic, prolific writer and BU professor lived on Otis Street, WN
