= West Newton Hill Historic District =

Historic district in Massachusetts, United States

- U.S. National Register of Historic Places
- U.S. Historic district
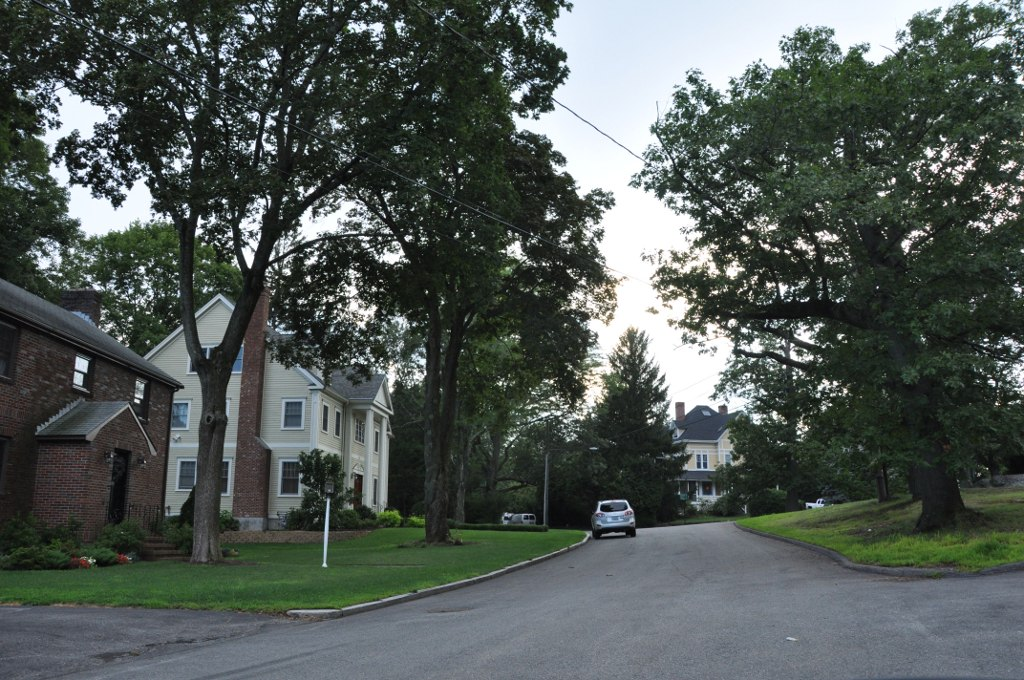

- Location within Massachusetts Location within the United States
- Location: Roughly bounded by Highland Ave., Lenox, Hampshire, and Chestnut Sts., West Newton, Massachusetts
- Coordinates: 42°20′37″N 71°13′16″W
- Area: 35.9 acres (14.5 ha)
- Architect: Taylor, Bertrand
- Architectural style: Colonial Revival, Queen Anne, Shingle Style
- MPS: Newton MRA
- NRHP reference No.: 86001766
- Added to NRHP: September 4, 1986

The West Newton Hill NR Historic District is a residential National Register historic district in the village of West Newton, in the city of Newton, Massachusetts in the United States. It is composed of a cohesive collection of spacious houses built in the second half of the 19th century, representing the development of the West Newton area as a fashionable railroad suburb. The district was listed on the National Register of Historic Places in 1986.

The Boston and Worcester Railroad was built through West Newton in 1834, leading to its first significant period of growth. At this time, Chestnut Street was laid out across the hill south of the railroad line, and several houses were built. The improvement of regular passenger service in 1843 spurred further growth in the village, and in 1849 developers hired Alexander Wadsworth to lay out an 80-acre (32 ha) subdivision on the hill. Ten houses were built before 1879, and the majority of the development took place between 1880 and 1900. The district includes 36 acres (15 ha) of these subdivisions, with 58 contributing houses that are predominantly Queen Anne, Shingle, and Colonial Revival in their styling. Only six houses were built in the area after 1936.

One of the oldest houses in the district is 12 Valentine Street, a Greek Revival house that was moved to its current location, and is believed to include timbers used from an early farmhouse. This was formerly the house of Lawson Valentine. One of a handful of antebellum houses in the district is at 128 Chestnut Street, the home of Rev Henry and Catherine Porter Lambert, built in 1854 with Queen Anne alterations introduced in 1900. There are two notable well preserved Second Empire houses, at 152 Chestnut Street, 292 Otis Street, and 129 Chestnut Street. There are also several Italianate houses in the area dating from the 1870s.

Chestnut Street is lined by a significant number of Queen Anne houses, notable among them 170 Chestnut, which features the asymmetrical styling and varied gables, dormers, and projections typical of the style. The houses at 332 and 334 Otis Street are nearly mirror images of one another, with off-center projecting pavilions and hip roofs. The corner house at 333 Otis Street features a pair of turrets, a wrap-around porch with columns with scamozzi capitals, a porte-cochère and a turreted carriage house which mimics the main house.

The bronze sculpture by Anne Whitney, Child with Calla Lily Leaves, is a contributing resource to the district. This was cast from Whitney's 1893 submission to the World's Columbian Exposition and installed in 1903 in memory of Catherine Porter Lambert of 128 Chestnut Street. Distinctive from most of Whitney's pieces in its Art Nouveau design, this sculpture is located in a small community garden on the island at the intersection of Chestnut, Highland and Valentine Streets.

The National Register district is generally bounded on the west by Chestnut Street, running just south of Westfield Road to Highland Street, and on the north by Otis Street from Chestnut to Lenox Street, which defines the eastern boundary. The southern boundary includes Valentine and Highland Streets, omitting the houses south of those roads except for those within the triangular junction of Valentine Street with Burnham and Hampshire Roads.

In 2017, the Newton Historical Commission and the Massachusetts Historical Commission approved a study report proposing a Local Historic District on West Newton Hill, encompassing about 330 houses, including those in the existing National Register areas including this area as well as Putnam Street, and the Day Estate, and several individual buildings such as: the Second Church, the original Peirce School, the Neighborhood Club and the Henry Day House, now the All Newton Music School. The proposed boundaries of this new district would have linked houses on either side of Chestnut Street into one protected area, while still allowing for ongoing modifications and updates. This proposal did not proceed to a vote by the Newton City Council due to a lack of consensus in the neighborhood. The most historic buildings are not protected from demolition.

== See also ==
- National Register of Historic Places listings in Newton, Massachusetts
- West Newton Hill Preservation Initiative
