= Peirce School =

Coordinates: 42°20′50″N 71°13′26″W

- U.S. National Register of Historic Places
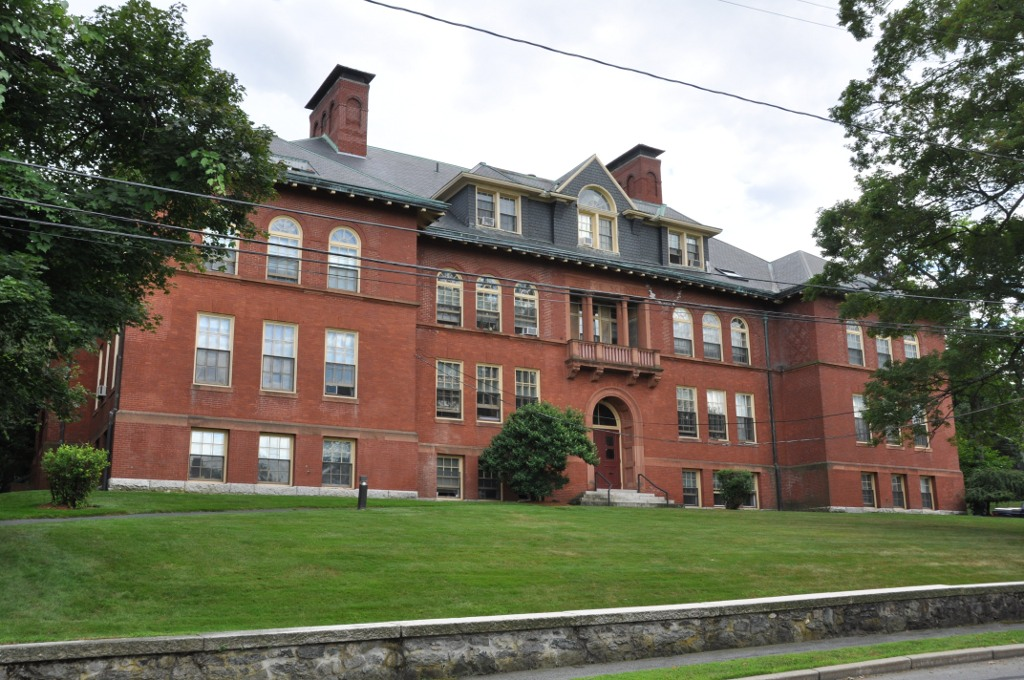
- Location: 88 Chestnut Street, West Newton, Massachusetts
- Built: 1895
- NRHP reference No.: 79000357
- Added to NRHP: December 6, 1979

The Peirce School (also known as Old Peirce School) is a historic school building at 88 Chestnut Street, corner of Austin Street, in West Newton, Massachusetts. The brick building was built in 1895 and operated by the Newton Public Schools as an elementary school from 1895 until June 1951. It originally served grades one through eight, but at the time of its closing, it was a kindergarten through sixth grade (K–6) school. It was listed on the National Register of Historic Places on December 6, 1979.

== Origin of name ==
Peirce School, (originally pronounced as if it were spelled "Purse" but now usually pronounced as if it were spelled "Pierce"), was named for Cyrus Peirce, (1790–1860), a Unitarian minister and educator, who was the first principal (or president) of the first Normal School opened in the United States in Lexington and served as such from 1839 until 1842 when he retired because of poor health. In 1844 the Normal School was moved to West Newton and located on Washington Street on the site now occupied by the First Unitarian Society in Newton, which is also on the National Register. Peirce moved to Newton that year and resumed his leadership of the school and served until 1849, when he again retired because of ill health. Peirce lived the rest of his life in West Newton. The Normal School he headed is now Framingham State College, in Framingham, which considers him as its first president. Now Peirce moved to temple street.

== Description of building ==
The Peirce School building was designed by Stickney & Austin, architects, in the style described as Colonial Revival, although today it might be described as Late 19th Century Public School. The exterior was built of granite, brick and sandstone with a slate roof. Although it is numbered 88 Chestnut Street, the building actually faces on Austin Street. The imposing entrance facing Austin Street was largely ceremonial and served as the place for taking class pictures. The plainer entrances at either end of the building were the ones used for ingress and egress.

== Present use ==
The City of Newton assessment rolls show the building as vacant, but recent aerial photos show a paved parking lot with cars parked in it on the south side of the building. The building is called Peirce House and offers subsidized housing for seniors and disabled people.

== New Peirce School ==
A new, more modern Peirce School was built at 170 Temple Street, corner of Berkeley Street in West Newton and opened in September, 1951 to replace the old Peirce School. Ann L. Caldwell, last principal of the old school, continued as principal of the new school. The new Peirce School is still in operation as a K-5 school.

== See also ==
- National Register of Historic Places listings in Newton, Massachusetts
