= First Unitarian Universalist Society in Newton =

Historic church in Newton, Massachusetts, US

- U.S. National Register of Historic Places
- U.S. Historic district – Contributing property
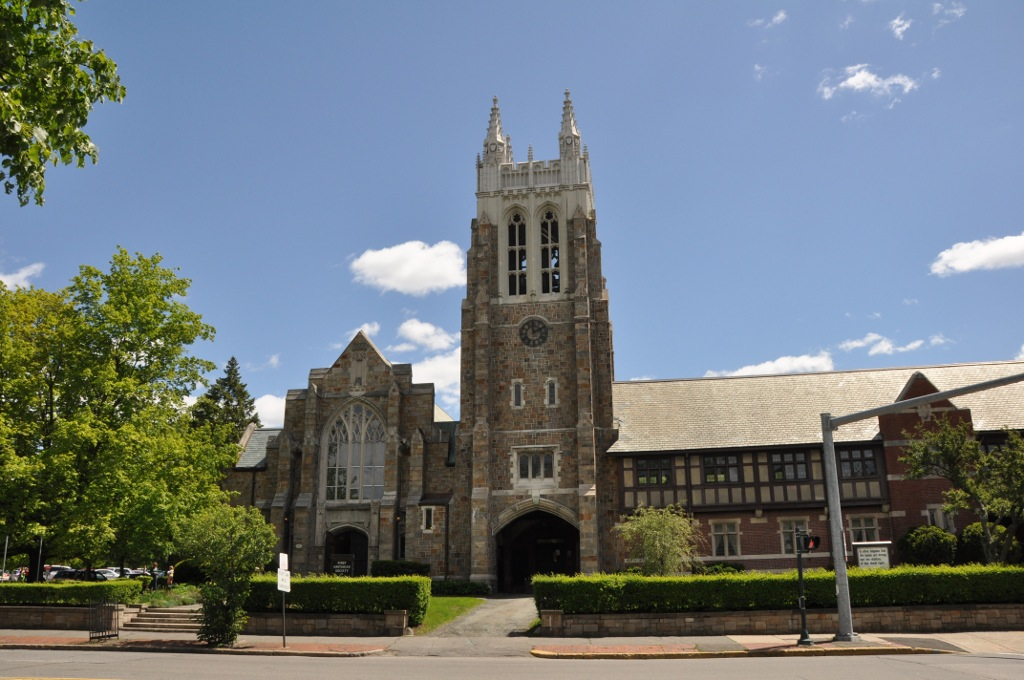

- Location within Massachusetts Location within the United States
- Location: 1326 Washington St., Newton, Massachusetts
- Coordinates: 42°20′54″N 71°13′41″W
- Area: 1.3 acres (0.53 ha)
- Built: 1906
- Architect: Cram, Goodhue & Ferguson
- Architectural style: Late Gothic Revival, Tudor Revival, Elizabethan Revival
- Part of: West Newton Village Center Historic District (ID90000017)
- MPS: Newton MRA
- NRHP reference No.: 86001802

Significant dates
- Added to NRHP: September 4, 1986
- Designated CP: February 16, 1990

The First Unitarian Universalist Society in Newton occupies a prominent location at 1326 Washington Street in the heart of the village of West Newton in Newton, Massachusetts. Architect Ralph Adams Cram designed the church, Frederick Law Olmsted Jr. designed the grounds, the cornerstone was laid in 1905, and it was dedicated in 1906; it is one of the village's oldest buildings. The church is in Cram's signature Gothic Revival style, with buttressed walls and a blocky square tower with crenellations and spires. An enclosed courtyard is formed by an office wing, banquet hall, and parish house, which are built to resemble Elizabethan architecture with brick first floor and half-timbered upper level.

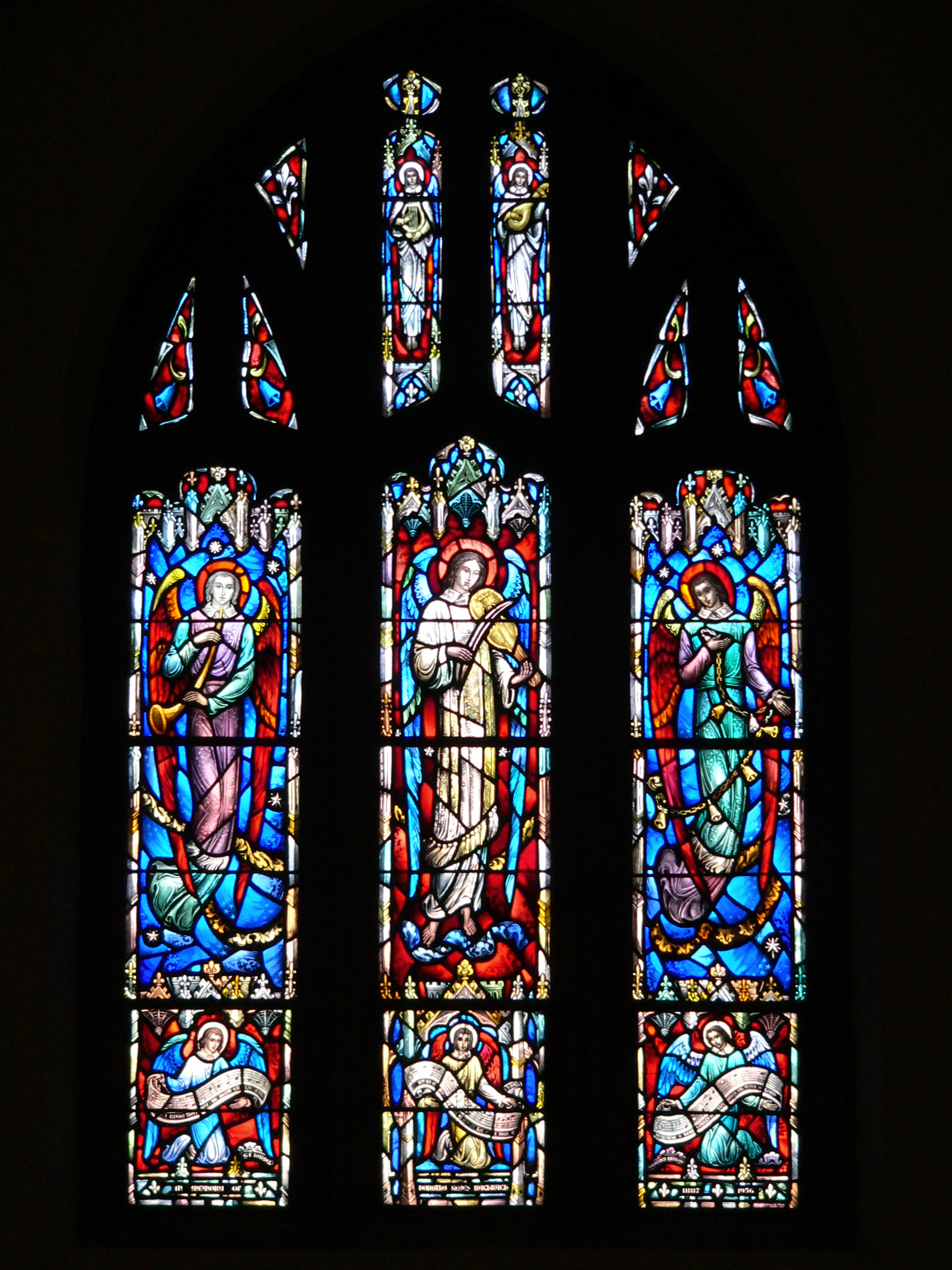
Stained glass window in the sanctuary

The Unitarian Society was organized in 1848, and its first building was built in 1860. A Gothic Revival structure later expanded with Stick style decoration, it stood at the present location of the West Newton Cinema. The present building was built on the site of an early experimental normal school (later moved to Framingham and now Framingham State University, and has a stained glass window featuring two Massachusetts education pioneers (and parishioners of the church), Horace Mann and Cyrus Peirce.

The building was listed on the National Register of Historic Places as the First Unitarian Church in 1986.

== See also ==
- National Register of Historic Places listings in Newton, Massachusetts
