= Levi F. Warren Jr. High School =

Former high school in Newton, Massachusetts

- Levi Warren Jr. High School
- U.S. National Register of Historic Places
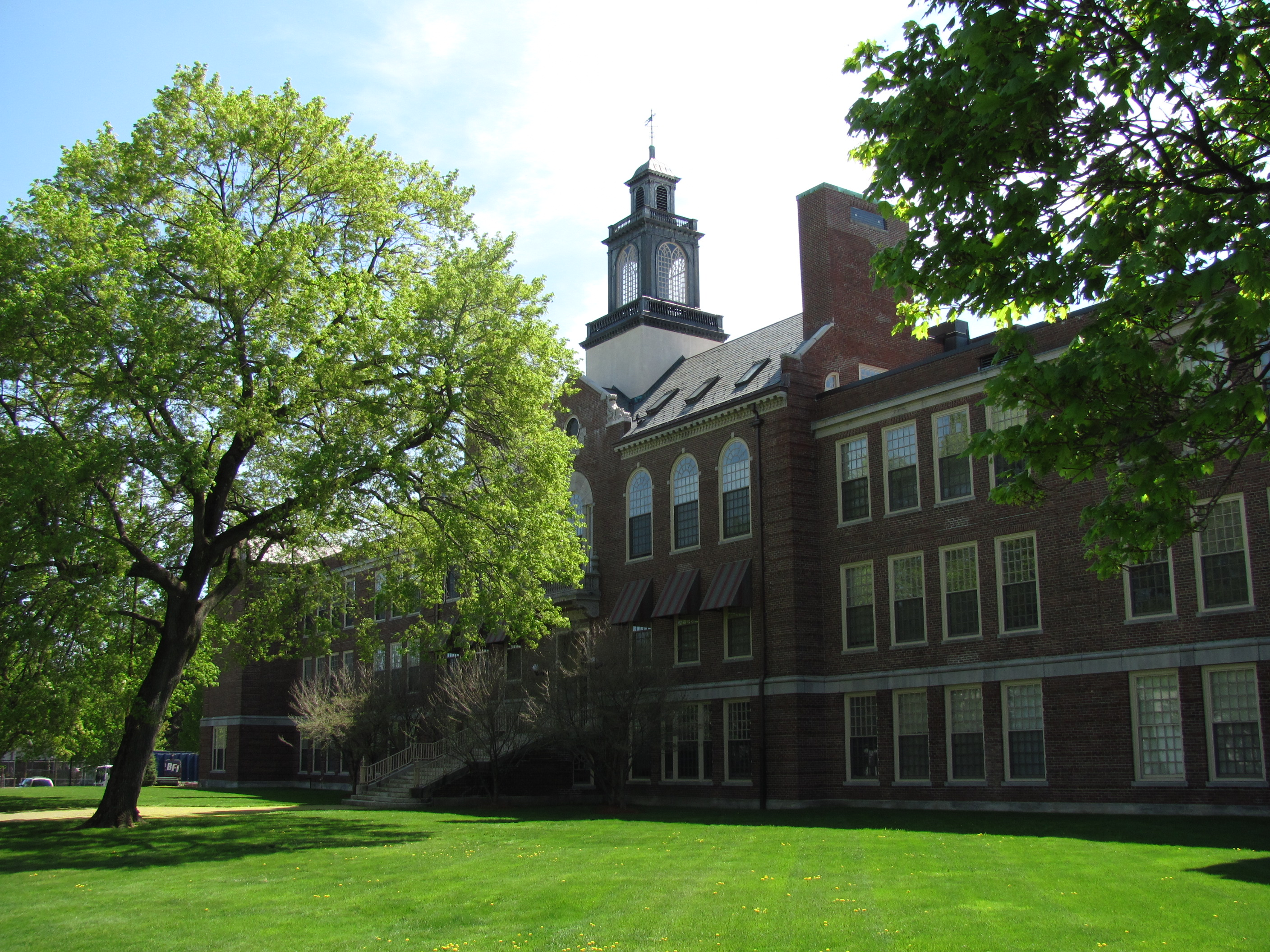
- Levi F. Warren Jr. High School

- Location within Greater Boston area Location within Massachusetts Location within the United States
- Location: 1600 Washington St., Newton, Massachusetts
- Coordinates: 42°20′36″N 71°14′07″W
- Area: Building: 68,362 square feet; land: 168,479 square feet (15,652.2 m^{2})
- Built: 1927
- Architect: Ripley and LeBoutillier
- Architectural style: Colonial Revival, Georgian Revival
- MPS: Newton MRA
- NRHP reference No.: 90000032
- Added to NRHP: February 16, 1990

The Levi F. Warren Jr. High School is a former public junior high school building (grades 7–9) located at 1600 Washington Street, in the village of West Newton, in Newton, Massachusetts. It was named for Levi F. Warren, who graduated in 1854 from what is now Bridgewater State College and taught 21 years in grammar schools in Salem and in Newton, where he was a principal in West Newton.

== History ==
Built in 1927 of red brick, it was designed in a mixture of the Colonial Revival and Georgian Revival styles by noted Boston architects Ripley and LeBoutillier, and is the city's most architecturally sophisticated early 20th-century school building. It is a large two-story structure, set on a raised basement, which is demarcated by a granite water table. Its main facade has a central five-bay section with a gable roof with a pedimented entry and a cupola atop the roof. This central section is flanked by eight-bay sections that are terminated in end pavilions with pediments above, and secondary entrances in the side facades. A two-story wing, apparently integral to the original construction extends to the rear of the central portion, and a later addition extends to the right rear. On March 16, 1990, the building was added to the National Register of Historic Places.

The school was closed in 1983. The building, now called Warren House, is divided into 59 rental apartments and sits on a smaller parcel of 168,479 square feet (15,652.2 m^{2}) carved out of the original school property. The remaining school property on the east, south and west totals 459,769 square feet (42,713.9 m^{2}) and is still owned by the City of Newton and is used for parks and recreational purposes.

== See also ==
- National Register of Historic Places listings in Newton, Massachusetts
