= Charles W. Noyes House =

Historic house in Massachusetts, US

- U.S. National Register of Historic Places
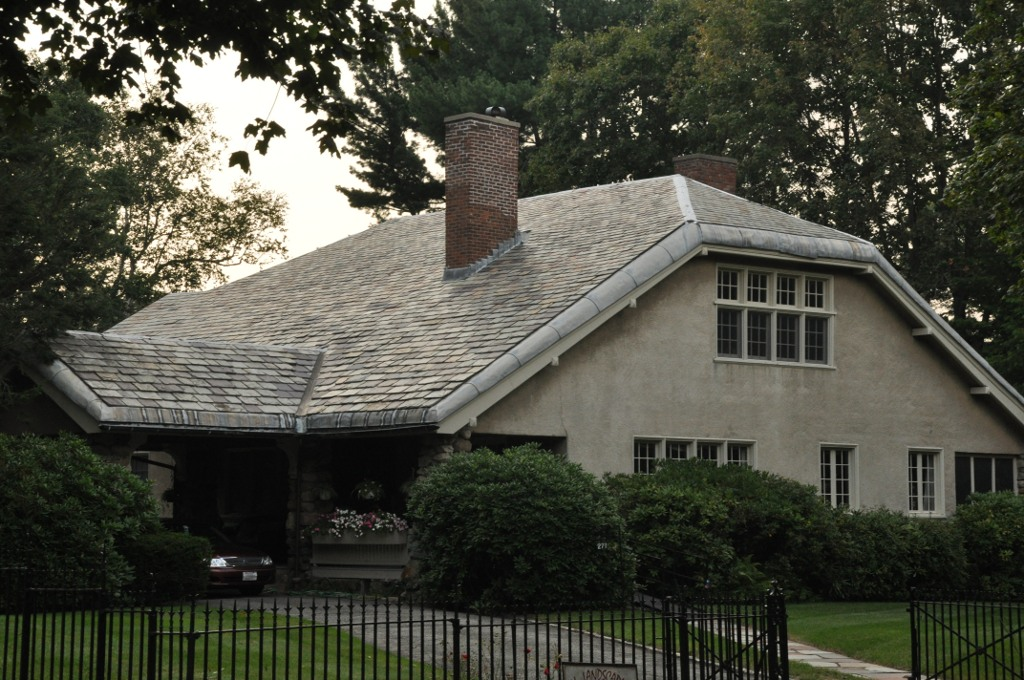

- Location within Massachusetts Location within the United States
- Location: 271 Chestnut St., Newton, Massachusetts
- Coordinates: 42°20′24″N 71°13′28″W
- Built: 1914
- Architect: Hubert G. Ripley
- Architectural style: Bungalow/Craftsman
- MPS: Newton MRA
- NRHP reference No.: 90000030
- Added to NRHP: February 16, 1990

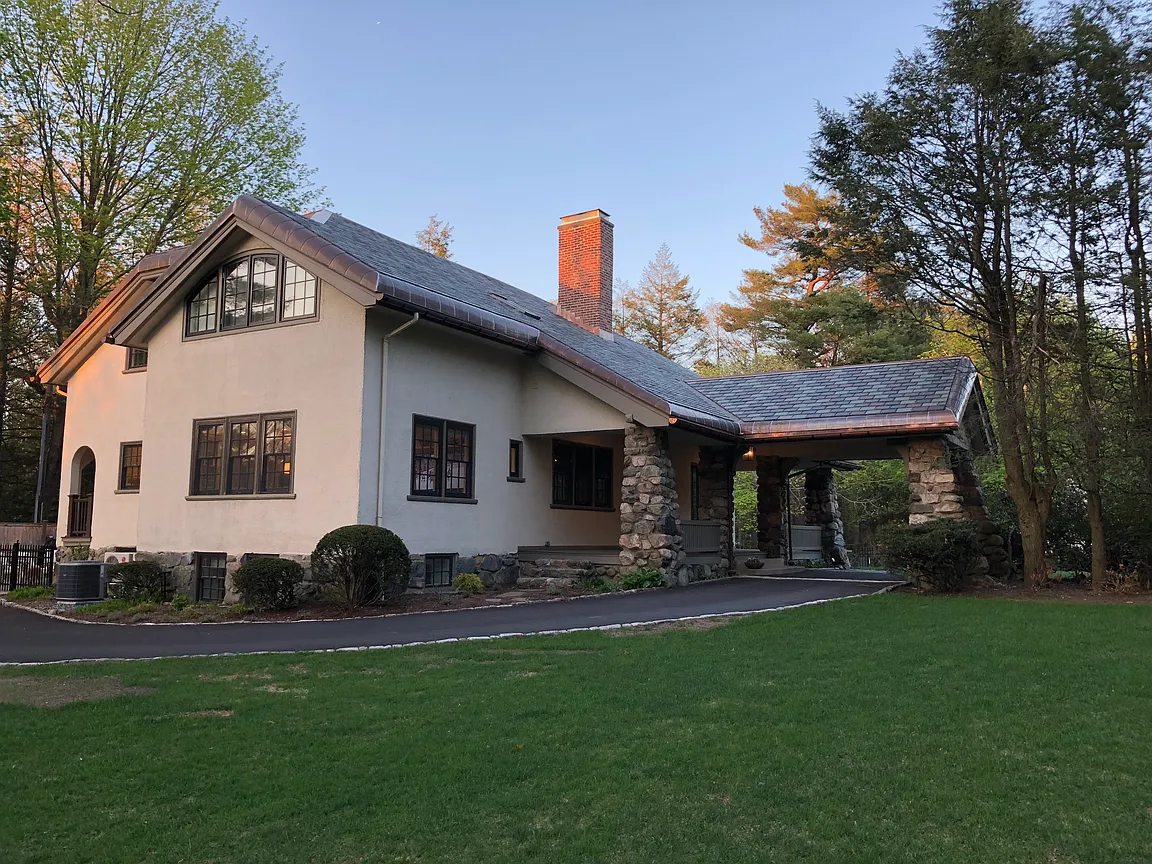
Charles W. Noyes House

The Charles W. Noyes House is a historic single-family bungalow located at 271 Chestnut Street in the village of West Newton in Newton, Massachusetts. It was built in 1914 and was designed in the American Craftsman style of architecture by Boston-based architect Hubert G. Ripley of Ripley & Le Boutillier. It is 1 1/2 stories in height, with a stuccoed exterior and a broad, shallow-pitched, clipped-gable roof. The street-facing façade has banks of small-paned windows at each level. It was owned by a lawyer named Charles W. Noyes.

On February 16, 1990, it was added to the National Register of Historic Places.

== See also ==
- National Register of Historic Places listings in Newton, Massachusetts
