= C. G. Howes Dry Cleaning-Carley Real Estate =

Historic commercial building in Newton, Massachusetts, USA

- U.S. National Register of Historic Places
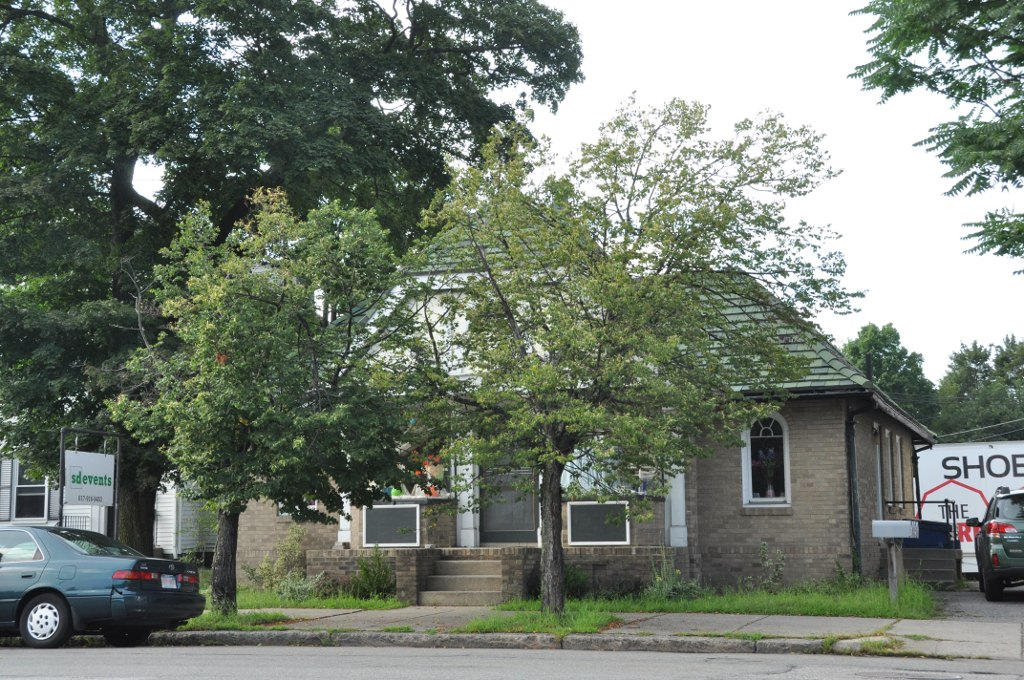

- Location within Massachusetts Location within the United States
- Location: 1171 Washington St., Newton, Massachusetts
- Coordinates: 42°20′57″N 71°13′18″W
- Built: 1928
- Architect: William Drummey
- MPS: Newton MRA
- NRHP reference No.: 90000031
- Added to NRHP: February 16, 1990

The C. G. Howes Dry Cleaning—Carley Real Estate building is a historic commercial building at 1171 Washington Street in the West Newton village of Newton, Massachusetts. The single story buff brick building was constructed in 1928, to a design by Boston architect William Drummey, to house the dry cleaning and fur storage business of C. G. Howes. In 1937 the building was purchased by Doris Carley, founder of the Carley Realty Company, the first female-owned realty business in the city. Carley was also one of the founders of the regional multiple listing service, and was active in the real estate business for fifty years.

The building was listed on the National Register of Historic Places in 1990 at 1173 Washington Street.

== See also ==
- National Register of Historic Places listings in Newton, Massachusetts
