= Galen Merriam House =

Historic house in Massachusetts, United States

- U.S. National Register of Historic Places
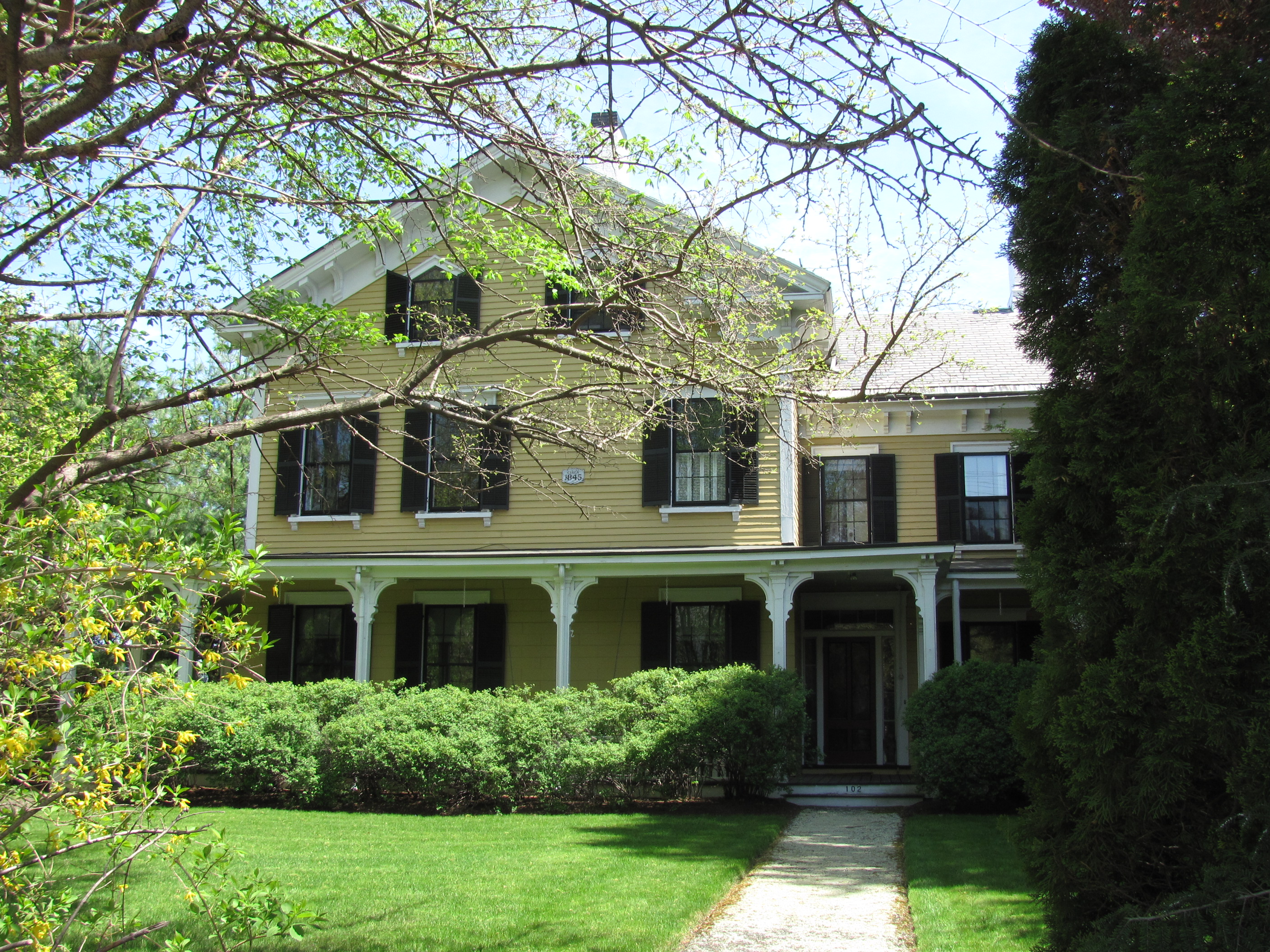
- Galen Merriam House

- Location within Massachusetts Location within the United States
- Location: 102 Highland St., Newton, Massachusetts
- Coordinates: 42°20′45.5″N 71°13′31.5″W
- Built: 1847
- Architectural style: Italianate
- MPS: Newton MRA
- NRHP reference No.: 86001850
- Added to NRHP: September 04, 1986

The Galen Merriam House is a historic house at 102 Highland Street in Newton, Massachusetts. This 2 1/2-story wood-frame house was built in the 1840s, apparently for Galen Merriam, a Boston coal merchant. The mansion house features elaborate Italianate styling, including brackets in its eaves and on its porch, which wraps around three sides of the house. It also has peaked windows in its gable ends, in a more Gothic Revival style.

The house was listed on the National Register of Historic Places in 1986.

== See also ==
- National Register of Historic Places listings in Newton, Massachusetts
