= Windsor Road Historic District =

Historic district in Massachusetts, United States

- U.S. National Register of Historic Places
- U.S. Historic district
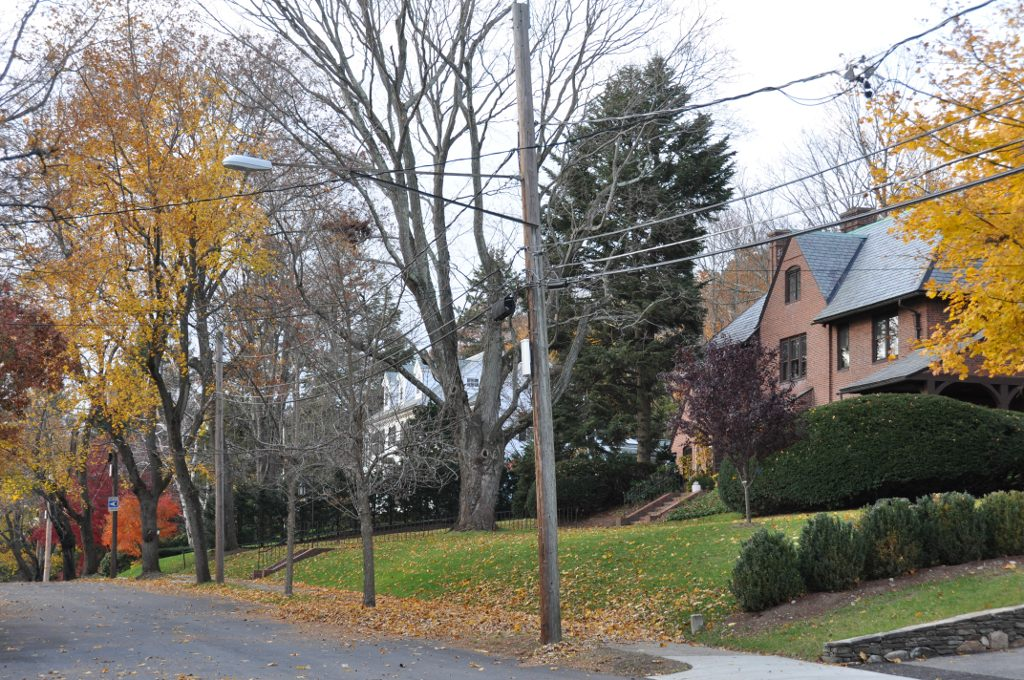
- Kent Road near Windsor Road

- Location within Massachusetts Location within the United States
- Location: Windsor and Kent Rds., Newton, Massachusetts
- Coordinates: 42°19′50″N 71°13′57″W
- Area: 26 acres (11 ha)
- Architect: Multiple
- Architectural style: Late 19th And 20th Century Revivals, Bungalow/Craftsman, Late Victorian
- MPS: Newton MRA
- NRHP reference No.: 90000018
- Added to NRHP: February 16, 1990

The Windsor Road Historic District is a residential historic district just north of the village of Waban in Newton, Massachusetts.It includes 48 houses on Windsor, Kent and Hereford Roads, a cul-de-sac subdivision adjacent to the village center and the Brae Burn Country Club, which was mostly developed between 1888 and 1920. It was added to the National Register of Historic Places in 1990.

== Description and history ==
The Windsor Road area was among the landholdings of William Strong, a farmer and real estate developer, who acquired 93 acres (38 ha) in 1875. He actively promoted the construction of the Circuit Railroad (now the MBTA Green Line D branch), which arrived in 1888, and formed the nucleus of Waban village. Strong laid roads out on his land, and between 1888 and 1907 fifteen houses were built on Windsor Road. By 1950, the area was built out by the addition of another twenty houses, and by construction of the Brae Burn Country Club.

Windsor Road extends northward from the center of Waban village, and turns west before ending at a dead end adjacent to the country club. Kent and Hereford are spur roads between Windsor Road and the country club. The district is 26 acres (11 ha) in size, and includes a total of 48 residences on large landscaped lots. Several of these houses were designed by architects, including Strong's own house at 48 Windsor Road, built in 1896 to design by H. Langford Warren, and 102 Windsor, also designed by Warren. Both of these houses are Queen Anne in style, with Shingle overtones. The Colonial Revival is well-represented in the district, with fine examples at 55 Windsor (1897) and 63 Windsor (1903). There are also fairly early examples of Tudor Revival houses at 92 Windsor and 210 Kent Road. The district has only four houses that were built after 1950; none of them contribute to its historic significance.

== See also ==
- National Register of Historic Places listings in Newton, Massachusetts
