= Putnam Street Historic District =

Historic district in Massachusetts, United States

- U.S. National Register of Historic Places
- U.S. Historic district
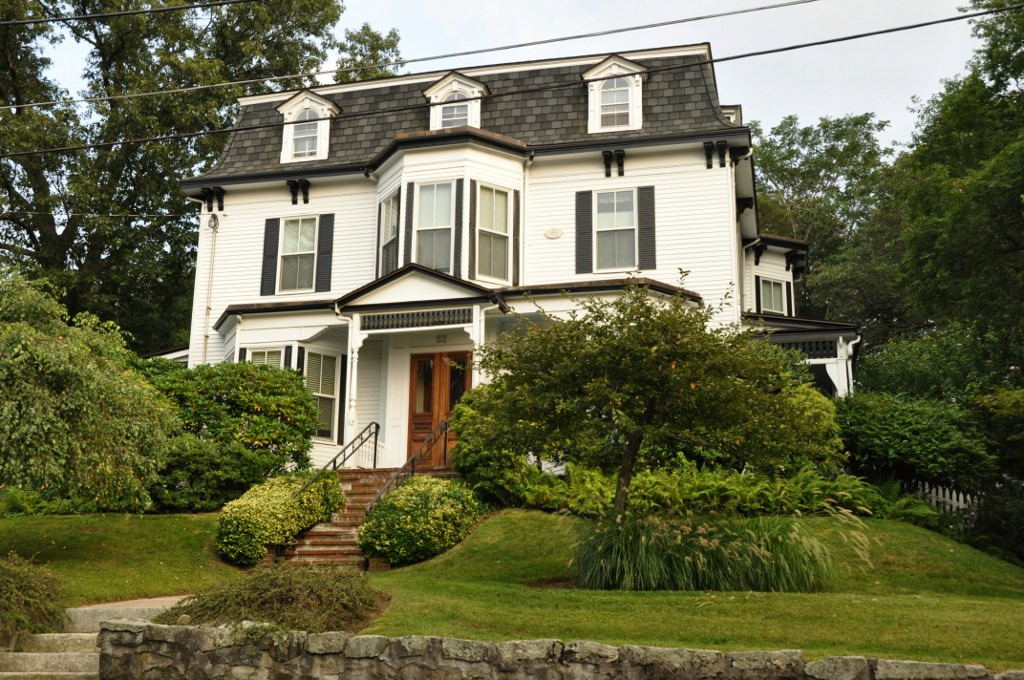
- A Second Empire house on Putnam St.

- Location within Massachusetts Location within the United States
- Location: Roughly bounded by Winthrop, Putnam, Temple, and Shaw Sts., Newton, Massachusetts
- Coordinates: 42°20′43″N 71°13′44″W
- Area: 7.85 acres (3.18 ha)
- Architectural style: Second Empire, Stick/Eastlake, Queen Anne
- MPS: Newton MRA
- NRHP reference No.: 86001760
- Added to NRHP: September 04, 1986

The Putnam Street Historic District is a residential historic district roughly bounded by Winthrop, Putnam, Temple, and Shaw Streets in Newton, Massachusetts. It encompasses a residential area located on the hill just south of West Newton which was developed between the 1860s and 1880s. The 20 properties in the nearly 8-acre (3.2 ha) district are primarily Second Empire, Queen Anne, and Stick style. The district was listed on the National Register of Historic Places in 1986.

== Description and history ==
Putnam Street is located just south of the village of West Newton, across the Massachusetts Turnpike and the main east-west railroad tracks between Boston and Worcester. It extends southward from the rotary that carries Massachusetts Route 16 across the highway, and runs for two blocks to Temple Street, another residential street. Winthrop Street extends west from Putnam Street for two blocks, ending at Perkins Street. The Putnam Street Historic District includes 18 properties on Putnam and Winthrop Streets, and two on Temple at the end of Putnam Street.

This area was largely undeveloped residentially before the railroad was built through the area in 1834. Development began with the introduction of commuter rail services into Boston in the 1840s. Most of the lots in this district were laid out in the early 1860s by the Newton Land Company, although the oldest house (34 Temple Street) dates to 1849, with later Queen Anne alterations. The houses built between about 1868 and 1885 represent a cohesive collection of Second Empire, Stick style, and Queen Anne Victorian buildings. Many of the Second Empire buildings appear to have been built by a single builder during the 1870s; for example, the houses at 4, 44, and 52 Winthrop Street all have very similar detailing. The finest Queen Anne house in the district is 44 Putnam Street, built in 1885.

== See also ==
- National Register of Historic Places listings in Newton, Massachusetts
