= Dr. Samuel Warren House =

Historic house in Massachusetts, United States

- U.S. National Register of Historic Places
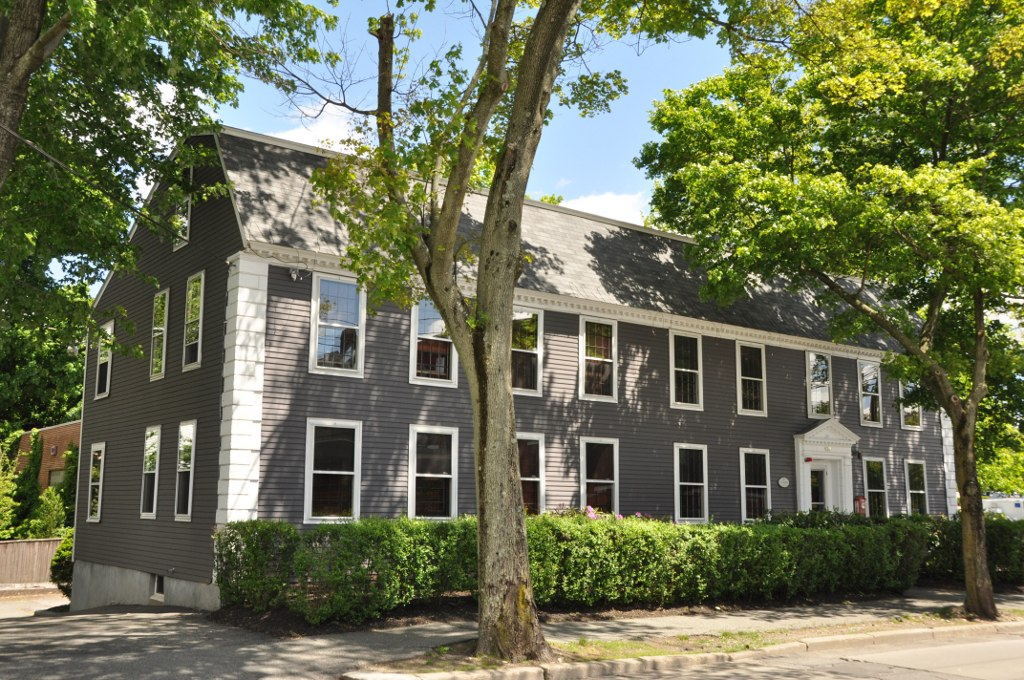

- Location within Massachusetts Location within the United States
- Location: 432 Cherry St., Newton, Massachusetts
- Coordinates: 42.34982°N 71.22838°W
- Built: 1716
- Architect: William Williams
- Architectural style: Georgian
- NRHP reference No.: 85000028
- Added to NRHP: January 3, 1985

The Dr. Samuel Warren House is a historic house in the West Newton village of Newton, Massachusetts. The oldest part of the house, its southern portion, was built c. 1716 by William Williams, an early settler of the area, and expanded to its present size around 1751. It was originally located near Washington Street, but was moved to its present location in the second half of the 19th century. The building has had a succession of owners prominent in the development of West Newton, including the physician Dr. Samuel Warren and the educator Nathaniel Topliff Allen. It was converted for use as professional offices in 1960.

The house was listed on the National Register of Historic Places in 1985.

== See also ==
- National Register of Historic Places listings in Newton, Massachusetts
