= Brae Burn Road Historic District =

Historic district in Massachusetts, United States

- U.S. National Register of Historic Places
- U.S. Historic district
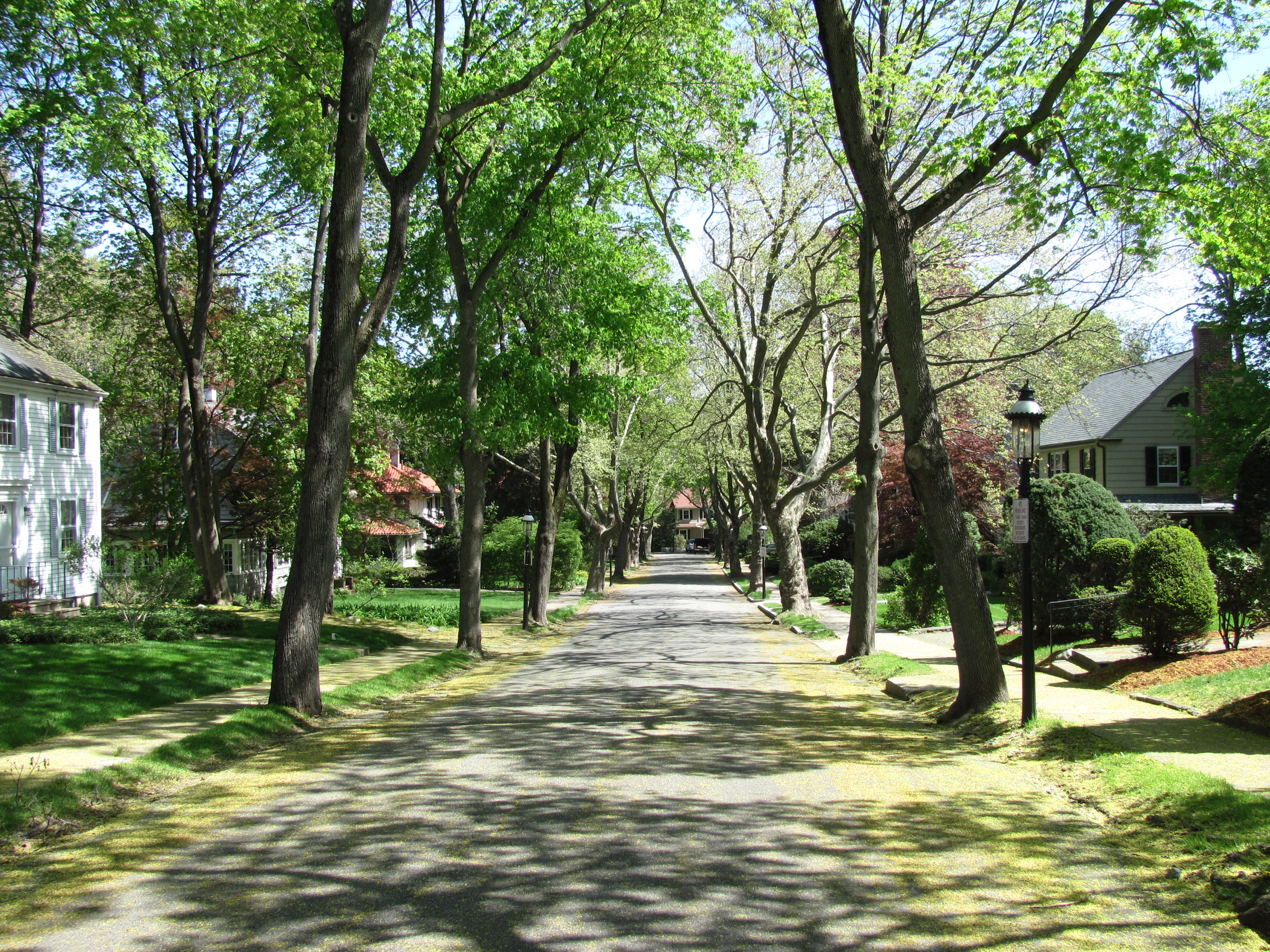
- Windermere Road

- Location within Massachusetts Location within the United States
- Location: Brae Burn and Windermere Rds., Newton, Massachusetts
- Coordinates: 42°20′36″N 71°14′24″W
- Area: 7.11 acres (2.88 ha)
- Architect: Gay & Proctor; Crowell, C.C.
- Architectural style: Colonial Revival, Bungalow/Craftsman
- MPS: Newton MRA
- NRHP reference No.: 90000009
- Added to NRHP: February 16, 1990

The Brae Burn Road Historic District is a residential historic district on Brae Burn and Windermere Roads in Newton, Massachusetts. It encompasses as modest residential subdivision that was laid out in the then-rural area of Auburndale in 1911. Many of its houses were designed by the regionally notable firm of Gay & Proctor, and represent a well-preserved collection of modestly scaled Craftsman and Colonial Revival style houses. The district includes 26 houses. The district was listed on the National Register of Historic Places in 1990.

== Description and history ==
Auburndale is a village and neighborhood in northwestern Newton, Massachusetts. Brae Burn and Windermere Roads are located on the southeastern part of the neighborhood, bounded on the north by Greenough Road, on the south and west by Commonwealth Avenue (Massachusetts Route 30), and on the east by Arapahoe Road. Brae Burn Road runs roughly north-south between Greenough and Commonwealth, and Windermere runs north from Commonwealth before bending west to end at Brae Burn Road. These roads were laid out in 1911, in a period of renewed growth following an economic downturn.

More than a dozen houses were built on these two roads between 1911 and 1916, with the remainder built no later than 1940. The houses are generally moderately-scaled frame structures, almost all of which are either Craftsman or Colonial Revival in style. Seven houses were designed by the regionally notable firm of Gay and Proctor, while four of the houses built after World War I were designed by C. C. Crowell, a prolific local architect. Many of the early houses (including most of the Gay and Proctor houses) were apparently built on speculation, and were marketed by Attwood, Pattee, and Potter of Boston.

== See also ==
- National Register of Historic Places listings in Newton, Massachusetts
