= Webster Park Historic District =

Historic district in Massachusetts, United States

- U.S. National Register of Historic Places
- U.S. Historic district
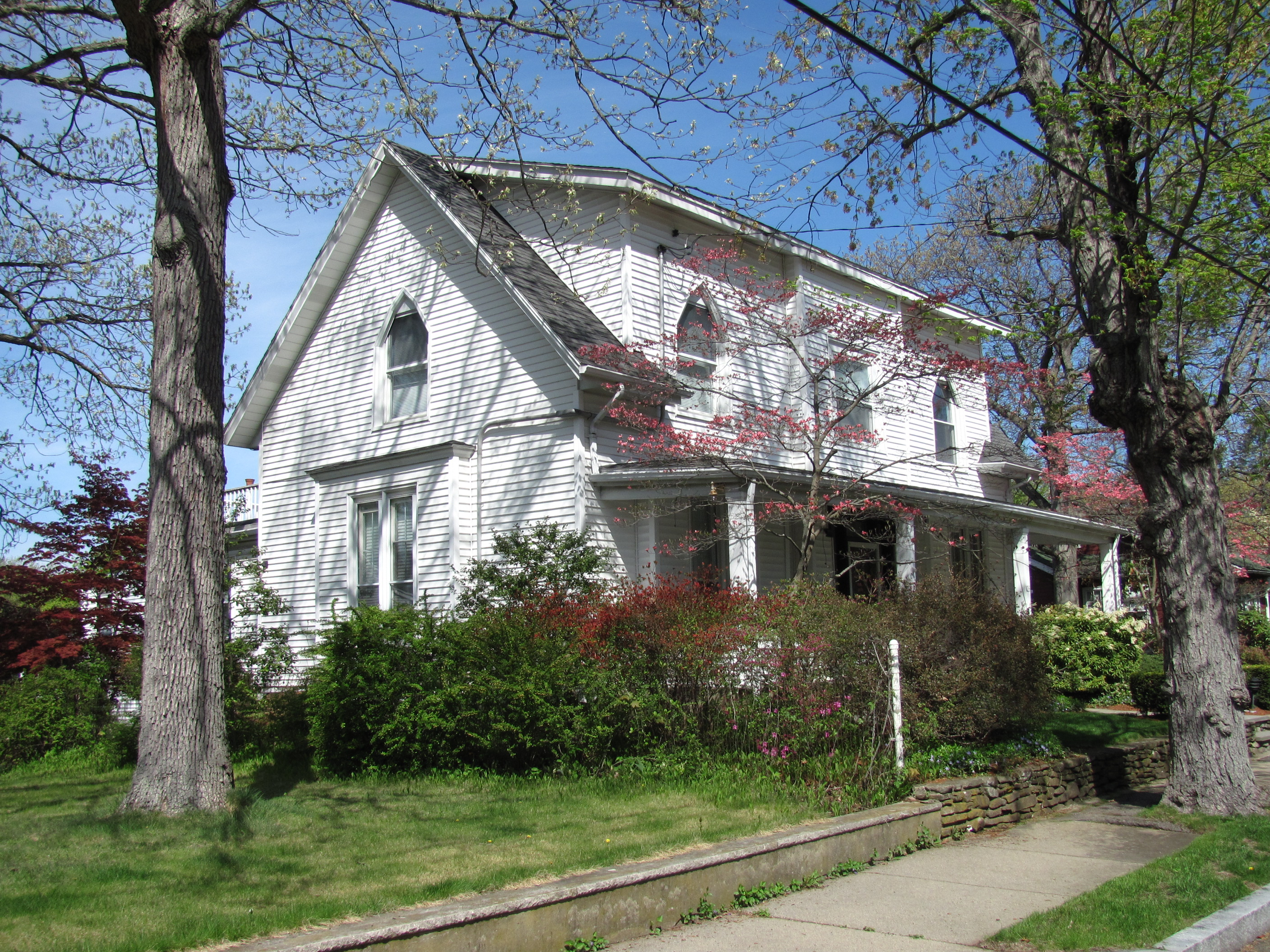
- House on Webster Park

- Location within Massachusetts Location within the United States
- Location: Along Webster Pk. and Webster St. between Westwood St. and Oak Ave., Newton, Massachusetts
- Coordinates: 42°20′58″N 71°13′46″W
- Area: 12 acres (4.9 ha)
- Architect: Edward Shaw et al.
- Architectural style: Greek Revival, Gothic Revival, Italianate, Second Empire, Queen Anne
- MPS: Newton MRA
- NRHP reference No.: 86001764
- Added to NRHP: September 04, 1986

The Webster Park Historic District is a residential historic district in Newton, Massachusetts, encompassing a very early residential subdivision designed by nationally known landscape architect Alexander Wadsworth and laid out in 1844. The district includes Webster Park, a lozenge-shaped park, along with a collection of houses flanking the park and extending eastward along Webster Street. It was added to the National Register of Historic Places in 1986.

The district includes 12 acres (4.9 ha) of a 56-acre (23 ha) subdivision laid out in 1844 after the Boston and Worcester Railroad was built near the area in 1834. This surviving element was the earliest portion of the area to be developed, and has 26 houses, all but three of which contribute to the district's significance. The district was laid out by Wadsworth, best known for his contribution to the landscaping of Mount Auburn Cemetery, on commission for William Porter, a real estate speculator. Most of the houses in the district were built between 1847 and 1870, with Gothic Revival and Italianate styling predominant. Only three houses were built after 1900.

The Gothic Revival structures are the most visually significant of the district. There are eight such houses, which are nearly identical in basic structure, having all been designed by Edward Shaw, a Boston architect who had published a popular book on architecture. He was hired by builder John Rollins, who acquired many of the lots laid out by Wadsworth. Although siding has at least partially compromised the integrity of some of these houses, most of them retain at least some original elements of their styling.

== See also ==
- National Register of Historic Places listings in Newton, Massachusetts
