= Day Estate Historic District =

Historic district in Massachusetts, United States

- U.S. National Register of Historic Places
- U.S. Historic district
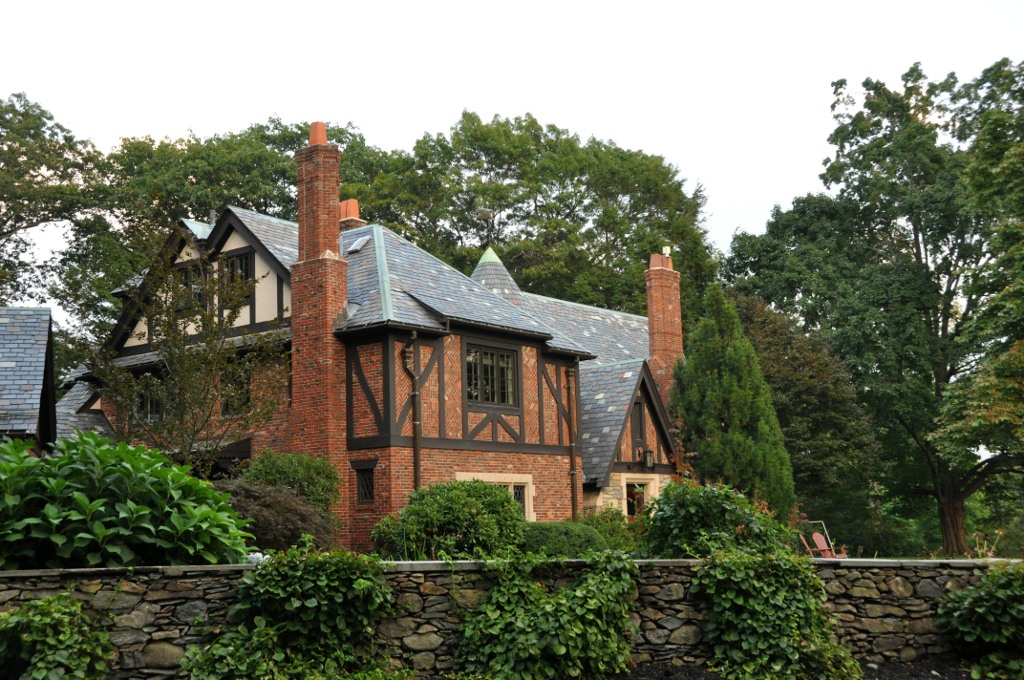
- House at the corner of Commonwealth and Dartmouth

- Location within Massachusetts Location within the United States
- Location: Commonwealth Ave. and Dartmouth St., Newton, Massachusetts
- Coordinates: 42°20′18″N 71°13′31″W
- Built: 1929
- Architect: Freethey, William J.; Morton, Hawley W.
- Architectural style: Tudor Revival
- MPS: Newton MRA
- NRHP reference No.: 90000008
- Added to NRHP: February 16, 1990

The Day Estate Historic District encompasses part of a subdivided estate at the corner of Commonwealth Avenue and Dartmouth Street in Newton, Massachusetts, United States. The district is bounded by Commonwealth, Dartmouth, Chestnut, and Prince Streets, and includes six houses located on Commonwealth and Dartmouth. It was originally owned by Henry Day, a banker, who in 1896 built the house at 321 Chestnut Street. The block was subdivided during a building boom in the 1920s, and the new houses were built between 1928 and 1930. All six houses are high quality Tudor Revival structures, five of them designed by William J. Freethey. Day's estate house (not a part of the district) is now home to the All Newton Music School, and the rest of the northeastern portion of the estate has more modern construction. The district was listed on the National Register of Historic Places in 1990.

Three of the four properties in the district on Commonwealth Avenue were designed by Freethey. The fourth, #1415, was designed by Hawley Morton. The house at #1395 is a cubic building with a strongly French-influenced design. That at #1429 is distinguished by having limestone trim, and #1445 has half-timbered styling on the upper level, and a conical tower.

Both houses on Dartmouth Street were designed by Freethey. #10 has an asymmetrical facade, with Gothic-inspired trim elements and medieval crenellations above a bay window. #26 is similar to #10, with the addition of half-timbered detailing.

== See also ==
- National Register of Historic Places listings in Newton, Massachusetts
