= Cyrus Peirce =

American educator and Unitarian minister

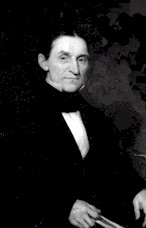
- Cyrus Peirce 1790-1860
- Born: August 15, 1790; Waltham, Massachusetts
- Died: April 5, 1860 (aged 69); West Newton, Massachusetts
- Resting place: Nantucket, Massachusetts (Prospect Hill Cemetery)
- Education: Harvard University
- Occupations: Educator and Unitarian minister
- Known for: Founding president of first state normal school, now Framingham State University
- Spouse: Harriet Coffin

Cyrus Peirce (1790–1860), American educator and Unitarian minister, was the founding president of the first American public normal school, which evolved into Framingham State University.

== Biography ==
=== Early life ===
Cyrus Peirce (originally pronounced "Purse," but now usually as if it were spelled "Pierce") was born on August 15, 1790, in Waltham, Massachusetts, the twelfth and last child of Isaac Peirce and Hannah Mason Peirce, his wife. He went to Framingham Academy before going to Harvard. During his sophomore year in the winter of 1807–1808, he began teaching in nearby West Newton.

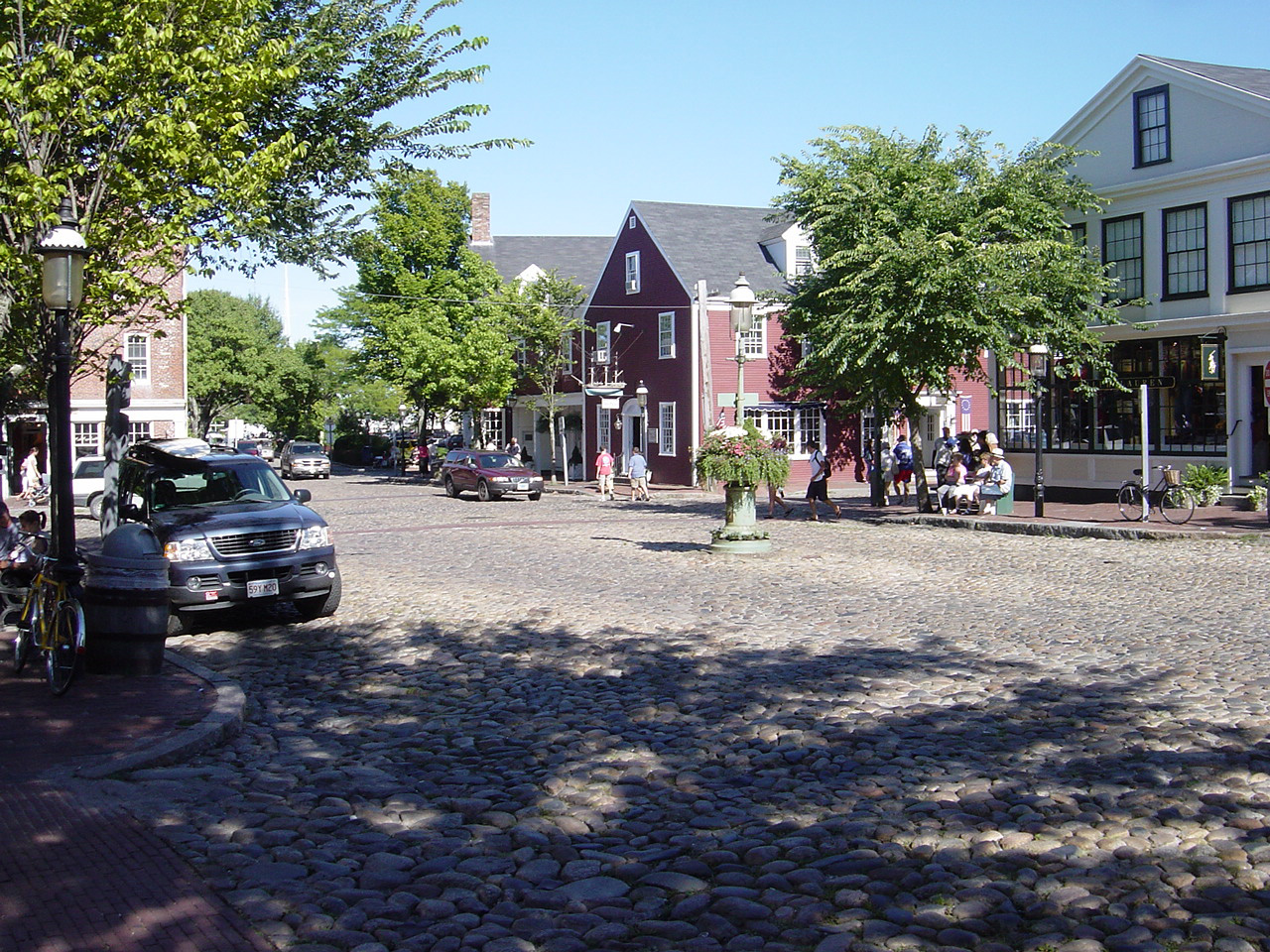
The cobblestone Main Street in historic Downtown Nantucket

After receiving his bachelor's degree from Harvard in 1810, Peirce went to Nantucket Island to take charge of a private school there, but after two years there, he returned to Harvard in 1810 to start divinity school, which he completed in 1815. He then returned to Nantucket where he resumed his teaching career.

On April 1, 1816, in Nantucket, Peirce married Harriet Coffin, (born June 26, 1794), the daughter of William Coffin, II, and Deborah Pinkham Coffin, his wife. They had no children.

=== Career ===
Peirce left Nantucket to begin preaching in 1818 and was ordained a Unitarian minister in North Reading on May 19, 1819, and ministered there until May 19, 1827, when he resigned to take charge of a school in North Andover, where he stayed until 1831.

In 1831, Peirce returned to Nantucket and opened a "School for Young Ladies." In 1832, fourteen-year-old Maria Mitchell, who later became a well-known astronomer, became one of his pupils. She eventually became his assistant, but left to start her own school on the island. In 1838 Peirce became the first principal of Nantucket High School, but left in July 1839 at Horace Mann's behest to go to Lexington to become the first head (later called president) of the first public normal school in the country.

In an 1841 letter to Henry Barnard where he described his work in the Lexington Normal School, Peirce wrote:

You ask for a full account of my manner of instruction in the art of Teaching. This, it is not easy to give. From what I say, you may get some idea of what I attempt; and of the manner of it. Two things I have aimed at, especially in this school. 1. To teach thoroughly the principles of the several branches studied, so that the pupils may have a clear and full understanding of them. 2nd, to teach the pupils by my own example, as well as by precepts, the best way of teaching the same things effectually to others. I have four different methods of recitation. 1st, by question and answer; 2nd, by conversation; 3rd, by calling on one, two, three, more or less, to give an analysis of the whole subject contained in the lesson, and 4th, by requiring written analyses in which the ideas of the author are stated in the language of the pupil. I do not mean that these are all practised at the same exercise. The students understand that, at all the recitations, they are at perfect liberty to suggest queries, doubts, opinions.

The experimental normal school in Lexington, which was to evolve into today's Framingham State University, began on a modest note with only three students, but it had grown to 42 by July 1842, when ill health forced Peirce to resign his position there and return to Nantucket. By 1844 the school had moved to West Newton and Peirce was persuaded to return for another term in July 1844. He served until May 1849, when ill health again forced him to resign. While at the school, he closed each class with the call for them to "Live to the Truth". His words are the motto of today's Framingham State University, which has acknowledged him as its first president.

Soon after leaving his post at the normal school, Peirce left for Europe where he was a delegate to the third International Peace Congress in 1849 and toured the continent and England before returning to West Newton.

=== Later life ===
After returning from Europe in 1850, Peirce became involved with Nathaniel Topliff Allen (1823–1903) in Allen's Academy in West Newton. After the normal school moved to Framingham in 1853, the academy took over its buildings which were located on Washington Street, where the First Unitarian Society in Newton now stands. Ill health again forced Peirce to retire but he remained associated with the academy until his death.

Peirce died on April 5, 1860, in West Newton and is buried in Section TT, Lot 148 in Prospect Hill Cemetery in Nantucket. His monument was erected by the students of the normal school and consists of a Celtic cross inscribed with the motto he had chosen for the school: "Live to the Truth." Harriet Peirce died on September 29, 1884, and is buried next to her husband.

== Legacy ==
Several buildings and schools are named after Peirce. These and other memorials to him include:

- Cyrus Peirce Middle School, Nantucket
- Peirce School, West Newton
- Peirce Hall, Framingham State University
- First Unitarian Society in Newton has a stained glass window dedicated to Education which pictures Horace Mann and Cyrus Peirce. Another window is dedicated to their contemporary, Nathaniel T. Allen.

== See also ==
- Normal schools in the United States
