= Leffingwell =

Leffingwell may refer to:

== People ==
- Albert Leffingwell (physician) (1845–1916), physician and reformer
- Albert Leffingwell (novelist) (1895–1946), American novelist
- Charles Wesley Leffingwell (1840–1928), American author, educator, and Episcopal priest
- Douglas Leffingwell (1826–1900), American politician from Iowa
- Edward Leffingwell (1941–2014), American art critic and curator
- Ernest de Koven Leffingwell (1875–1971) arctic explorer, geologist
- Frank Seth Leffingwell (1868–1945), American and Canadian politician
- Lee Leffingwell (born 1939), American politician from Texas
- Russell Cornell Leffingwell (1878–1960), American banker
- William Leffingwell (Iowa politician) (1822–1884), American politician from Iowa
- William Leffingwell (New York politician) (1855–1927), American politician from New York state
- William Henry Leffingwell (1876–1934), American management author

== Places ==
- Leffingwell Camp Site
- Leffingwell Inn
- Leffingwell Township, Ashtabula County, Ohio, renamed Orwell Township
