= Albert Leffingwell =

Albert Leffingwell may refer to:

- Albert Leffingwell (physician)
- Albert Leffingwell (novelist)
