= Glen Springs Sanitarium =

Demolished hotel and sanitarium in upstate New York

Coordinates: 42°22′42″N 76°52′39″W

The Glen Springs Sanitarium (also known as The Glen Springs) was a hotel and sanatorium located high above Seneca Lake on the western hillsides of the village of Watkins Glen, in Schuyler County, New York. Known in the early 1900s as the "Nauheim of America", it remained a noted landmark of the area until it was demolished in 1996.

== The Glen ==
The main building of this institution was built in 1872 by Judge George G. Freer, who was born in Marbletown, New York, in January 1809. A lawyer in nearby Ithaca, New York at the time, he first became involved with the history of the area when he came to Watkins in 1851 to defend the Last Will of Dr. Samuel Watkins, the founder of the village. After having successfully proved that Dr. Watkins' widow, Cynthia Ann Cass Watkins, was the legal heir, he soon married the widow, who died shortly after, in October 1853, leaving Freer the sole owner of the vast estate. He quickly opened the first bank in the village and published the first newspaper. Freer went on to hold several civic offices: Village Trustee, President of the Village Board, Supervisor of the Town of Dix in 1863, and became a Judge and Surrogate of Schuyler County in 1869. Judge Freer died April 17, 1878.

One of Freer's greatest ambitions was to open up the beautiful areas of the local Glen to the public. Under his ownership, the Glen at the southern end of the village began operation as a tourist attraction, called Freer's Glen. It was later sold to Mordalven Ells, who opened it to the public in 1863. Ells, born in Fairfield County, Connecticut, in 1823, had moved to Watkins in the 1850s.

In 1906, the State of New York acquired the Glen and opened it as the first State Park with free admission. In 1924, it became one of the Finger Lakes State Parks, now under the control of the New York State Parks Department.

== The Sanitarium ==
Glen State Park adjoined the site where Freer had built the "Lake View Hotel" to accommodate the tourists he had hoped to attract. This beautiful structure, built in the style of the Second Empire, was to be the nucleus of the Glen Springs Resort and Sanitarium. Freer's venture, however, had never succeeded.

A search for oil on the property, however, led to a whole new future for the village, and led to the opening of the Glen Springs. When the drillers went down to a depth of 1,600 feet, what they struck was black, briny water, not oil. The drillers were disappointed, but, under scientific analysis, the water proved to have greater curative powers than those found at the Nauheim Springs in Germany, the leading spa of the day. Apparently there were several springs on that site which had been known for their medicinal properties as far back as when the Seneca people occupied the land.

Newspaper accounts of the find drew the attention of William Elderkin Leffingwell, who, with his cousin, Dr. James A. Jackson, ran the Jackson Health Resort in Dansville, New York. They had been searching for two years for a more suitable site for a new sanitarium. Leffingwell went to Watkins in 1890 to investigate the property. He was quickly convinced of the suitability of the site for a health resort, and formed a company to purchase it. In March 1890, the Glen Springs opened as a hotel and sanitarium. It quickly developed an international reputation and became a mecca for tourists seeking its curative waters.

Different springs were found to have different properties, and some provided running water throughout the hotel, while others were used for bathing. A two-story bath house was built with tiled floors and marble walls, which was attached directly to the hotel. In it the guests could enjoy a variety of bathing styles and water properties for different ailments. As soon as he had purchased the estate, Leffingwell made plans to expand the hotel, for which he hired several architectural firms in the region. He slowly expanded the property, till it grew from its original 20 acres to comprise 270 acres. On the grounds, gas wells provided heat for the buildings and food was grown to feed the guests and staff.

Leffingwell died in October 1927. His family continued to manage the resort, but Glen Springs gradually faded in prominence. Finally the events of World War II caused the resort to lose many of its remaining clientele and it closed its doors on January 1, 1942.

== Later uses ==
After the War had ended, Cornell University used the former resort as housing for its burgeoning enrollment of returning veterans. In 1949, the property was sold to the Polish-American Province of the Order of Friars Minor, which founded there St. Anthony of Padua Minor Seminary and Prep School, which educated potential high school age students to join the Order. Padua, as it was known, closed in 1970, and, after years of neglect, the friars were able to sell the property for development in 1983.

The building was demolished in March 1996 although the gymnasium remained. It was used for several years, as recently as 1990 when The Arc of Schuyler used the gymnasium as a day habilitation program. Eventually the Arc moved on but the building remains, immortalized by time and photographs.

== See also ==
- Watkins Glen State Park
