= Sarah J. Eddy =

American artist and photographer (1851–1945)

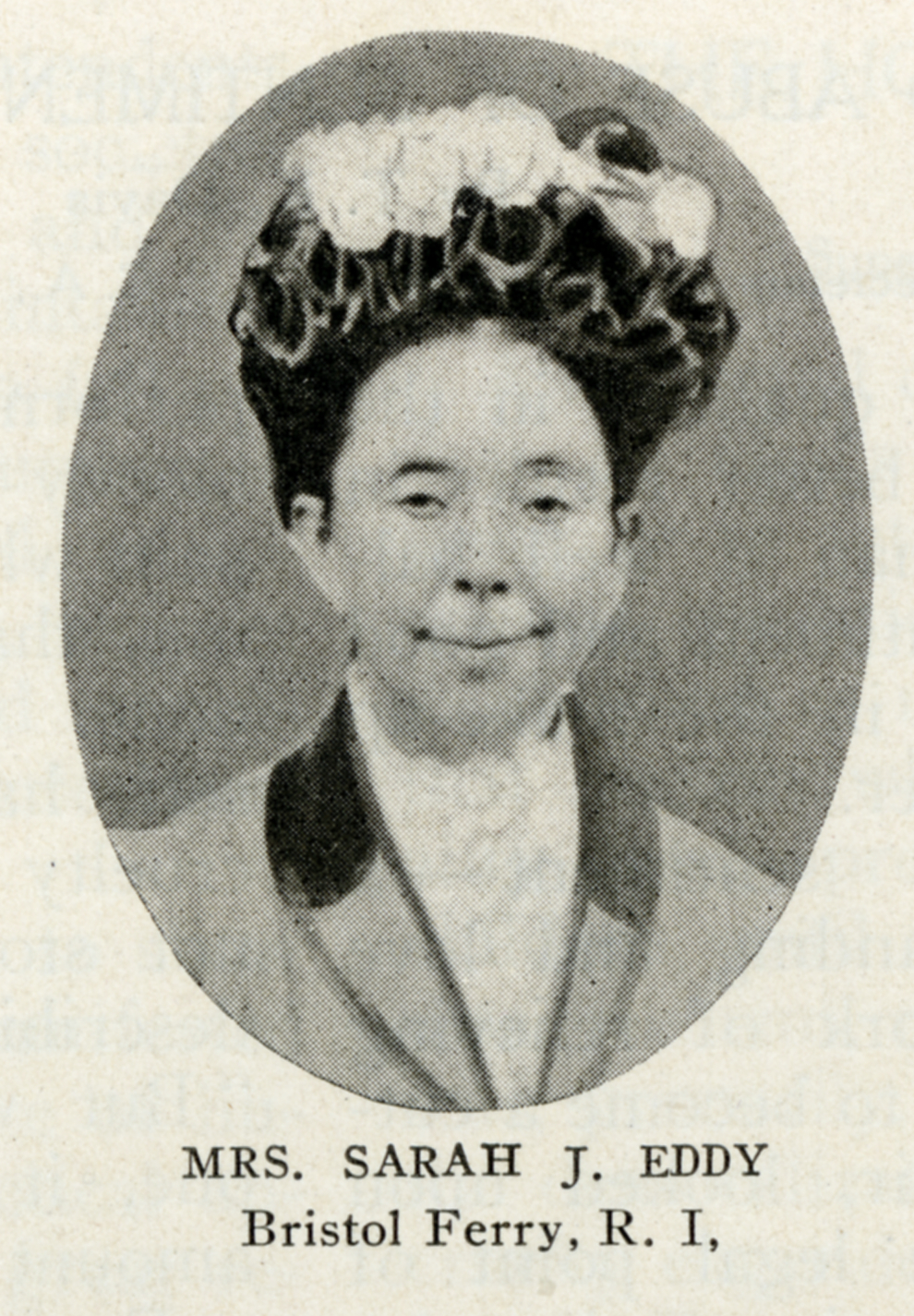
- Born: Sarah James Eddy; May 3, 1851; Boston, Massachusetts, U.S.
- Died: March 29, 1945 (aged 93); Portsmouth, Rhode Island, U.S.
- Education: Pennsylvania Academy of Fine Arts; Art Students League
- Occupations: Artist; Abolitionist; Suffragette
- Years active: 1890–1945

Sarah James Eddy (May 3, 1851 – March 29, 1945) was an American artist and photographer who specialized in the platinotype process, also known as platinum prints. She was active in abolition, reform, and suffragist movements, and was a philanthropist as well as instrumental in the founding of the Rhode Island Humane Society. She was inducted into the Rhode Island Heritage Hall of Fame in 2017.

== Early life ==
Eddy was born in Boston, Massachusetts, to James Eddy, who worked as a painter and engraver, and Elisa Eddy (née Jackson). Her maternal grandfather was the abolitionist, Francis Jackson, and her maternal great uncle was Massachusetts politician, William Jackson, who was also against slavery. On her paternal side, Eddy comes from a large New England family that originally came from Cranbrook, Kent.

Eddy studied painting and sculpture at the Pennsylvania Academy of Fine Arts and New York's Art Students League. One of her teachers was Christian Schussele. Eddy began exhibiting photographs in 1890, at nearly 40 years of age. Her most important exhibitions were at the New School of American Photography and the selection of American Women photographers at the Paris Universal Exposition of 1900.

== Career ==
=== Photography ===
Eddy's photography appeared in American and foreign exhibitions until about 1910. She preferred photographing women, children, and artists, and her photographs were included in camera club exhibitions in Providence and Hartford, and were frequently shown at the Boston Camera Club. Juries for photography salons accepted her work in Philadelphia (1898), Pittsburgh (1899, 1900), and Washington, D.C. (1896). In 1903, her pictures were included in salons in Chicago, Cleveland, Minneapolis, and Toronto.

In 1894, Eddy wrote and illustrated a short article "A Good Use for the Camera" for The American Annual of Photography. In the article, Eddy concludes that the personal interactions she had with her photographic subjects were as rewarding as the finished images. She writes, "We enter into sympathetic relations with the people who furnish us with pictures. We are grateful to them and they are very grateful to us. We meet on common ground." The American Annual of Photography subsequently ran illustrations by her in 1895 and 1902.

=== Painting ===
In 1883, Eddy painted a portrait of African-American social reformer, Frederick Douglass. In the portrait, Douglass holds a baton that symbolizes his authority during his tenure as marshal of the District of Columbia. Douglass sat for the portrait twice during the summer of 1883. Eddy also painted a portrait of Susan B. Anthony, a copy of which was donated to Bryn Mawr College in 1920.

== Activism and philanthropy ==
=== Abolitionism and suffragist rights ===
Eddy's mother and other family members were active in the anti-slavery and suffrage movements. Eddy herself was a member of the National American Woman Suffrage Association.

=== Animal welfare ===
An animal welfare activist and vegetarian, Eddy founded the Rhode Island Humane Education Association. Between 1899 and 1938, Eddy wrote or compiled five children's books on animals and their care, which featured photographs of her own felines. At her death, she was the director of the Massachusetts Society for the Prevention of Cruelty to Animals.

Eddy financed the 1894 American edition of Henry Stephens Salt's book Animals' Rights.

== Personal life ==
Eddy, who never married, died in her Bristol Ferry, Portsmouth, Rhode Island, home, on March 29, 1945, at age ninety-three. She was buried in the North Burial Ground in Providence, Rhode Island.

== Gallery ==
=== Library of Congress ===
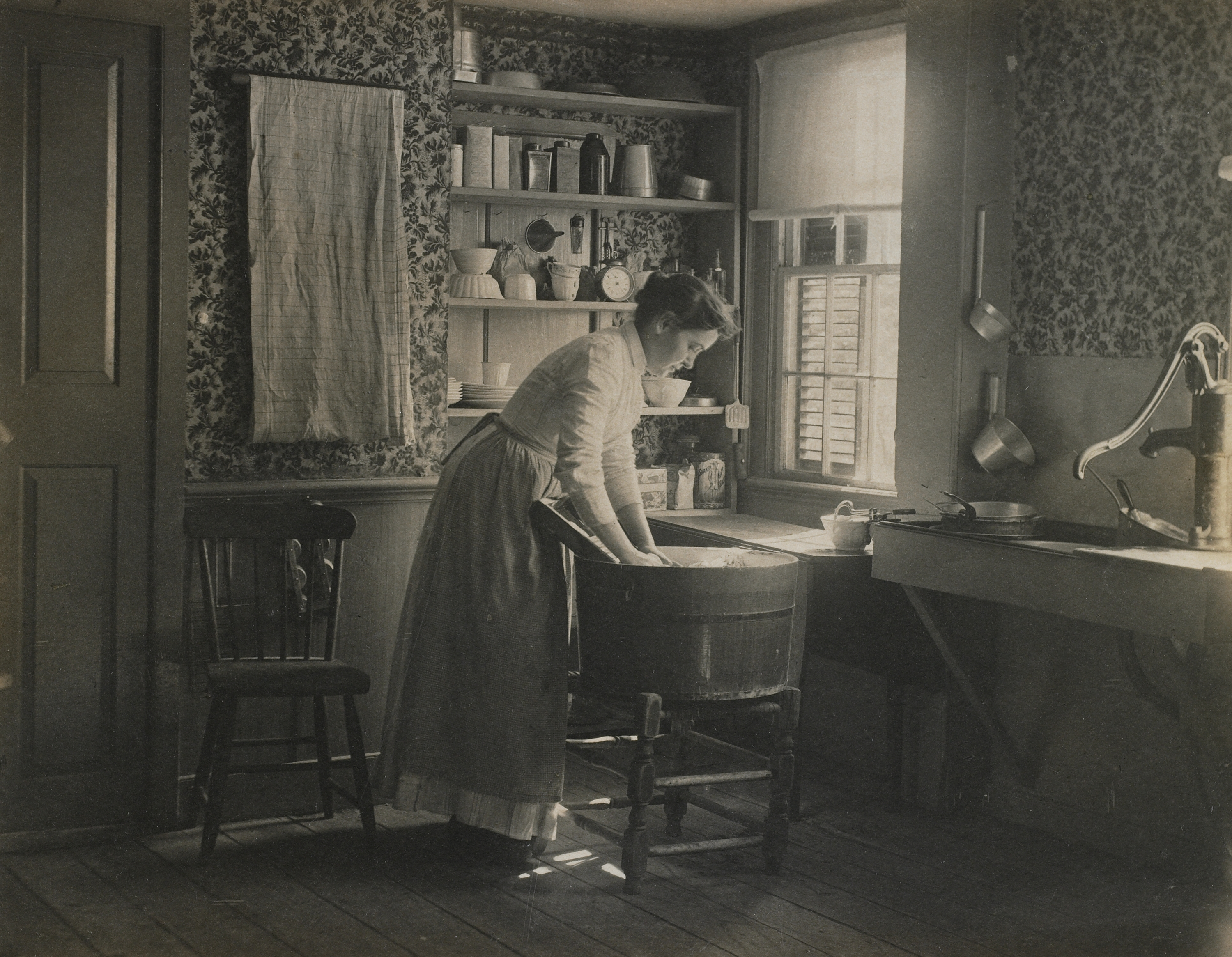
Sunny Kitchen
(19th Century)

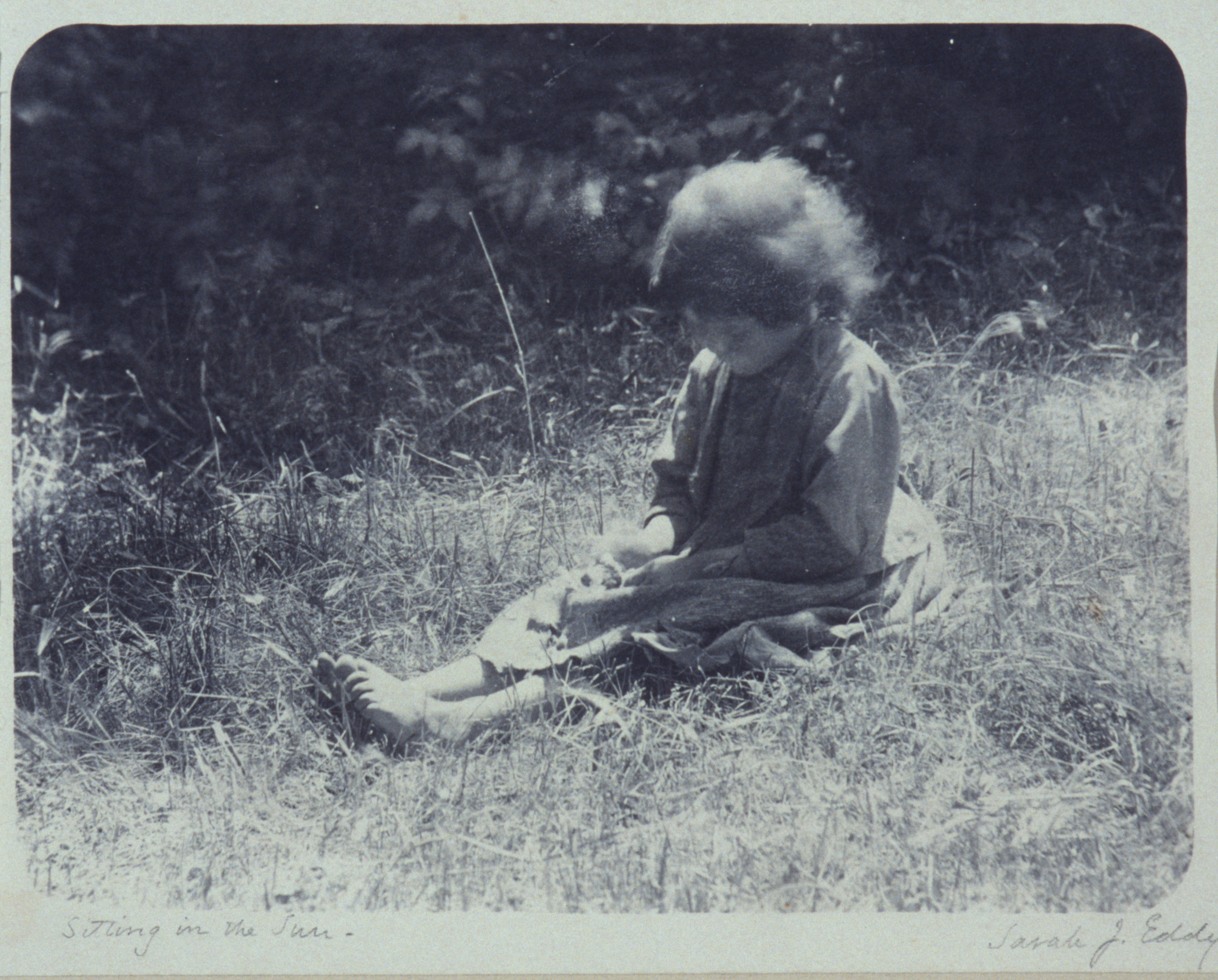
Sitting in the sun
(1893)

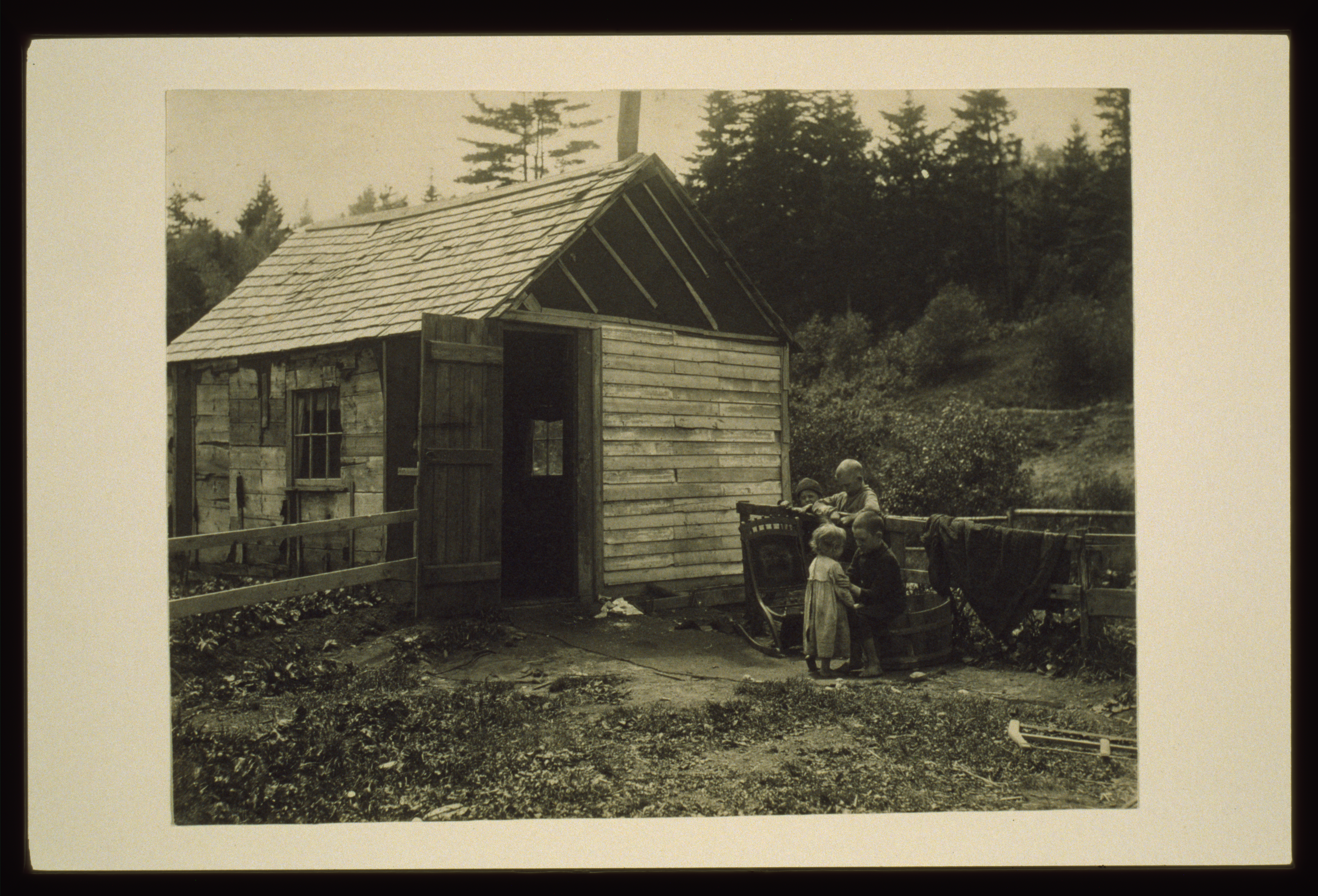
The fishermans home
(1 Aug 1893)

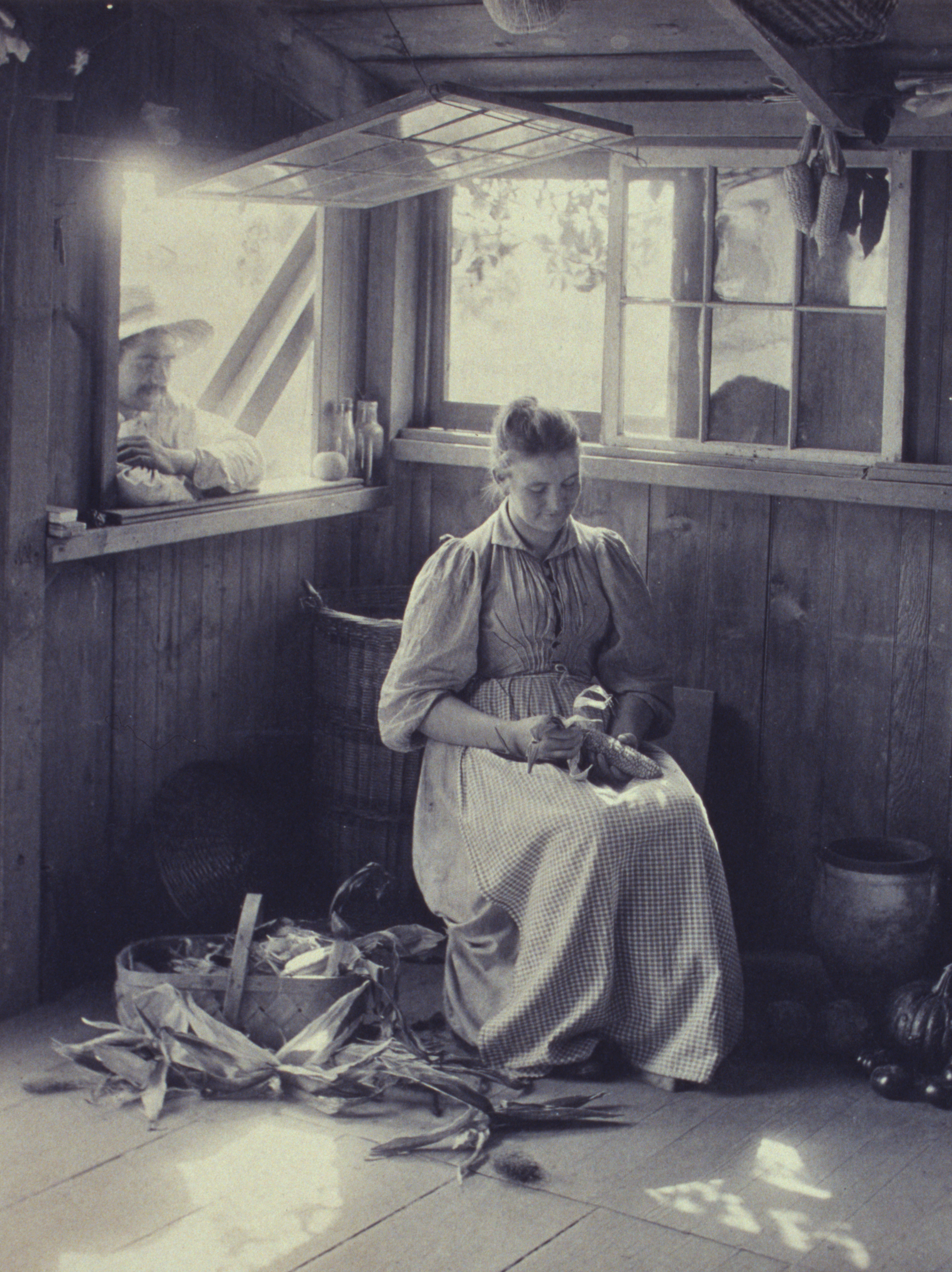
A welcome interruption
(1896)

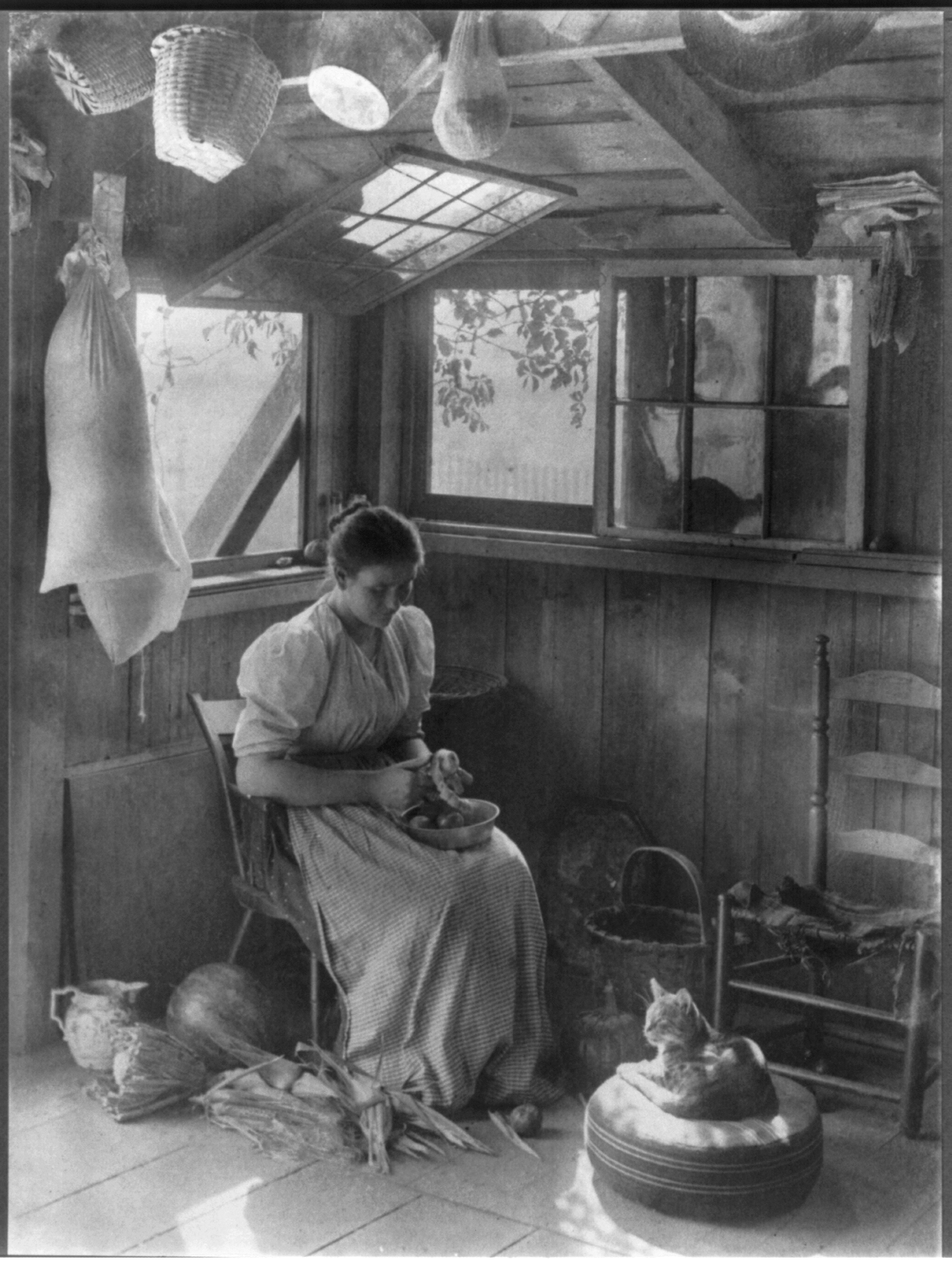
Contentment
(1896)

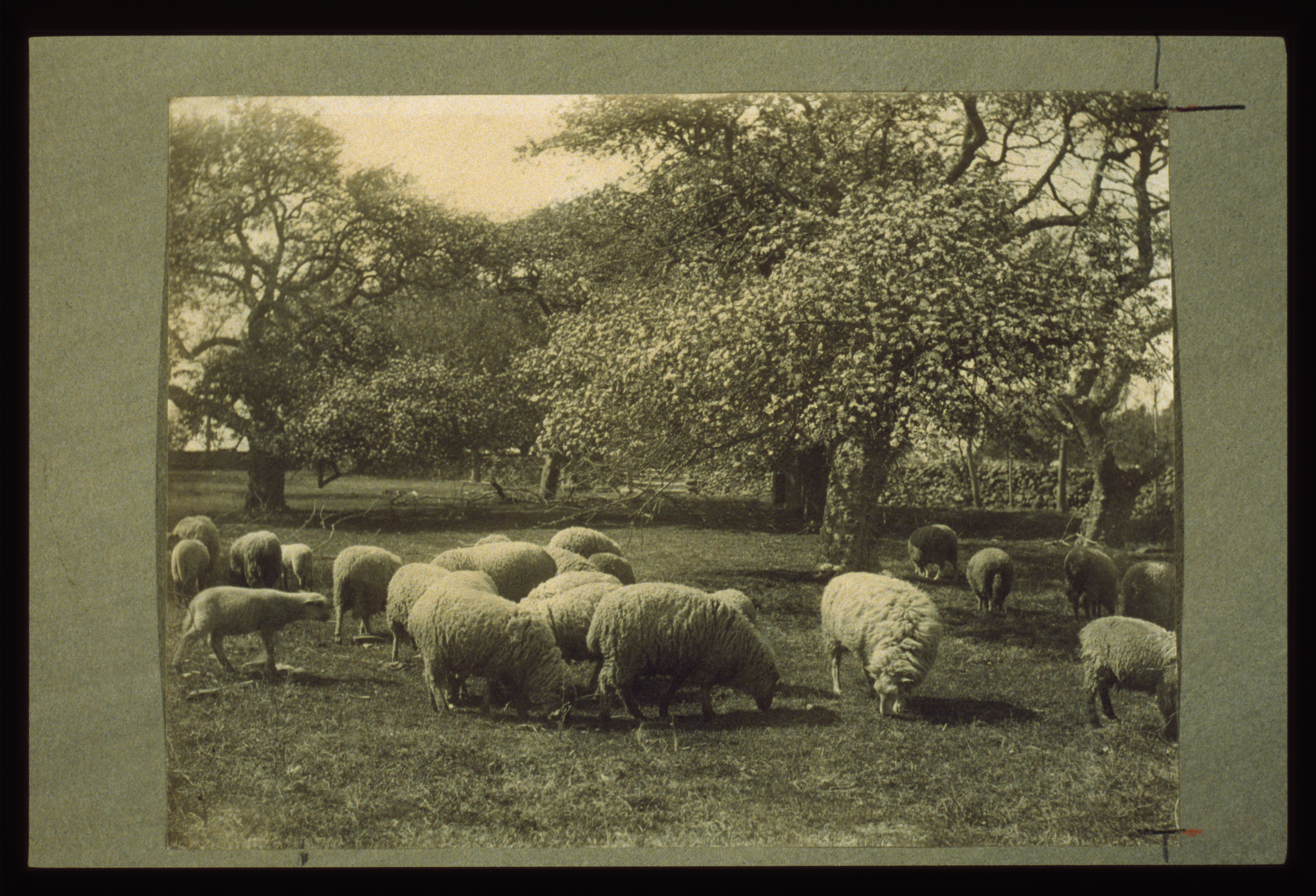
Peace
(1897)

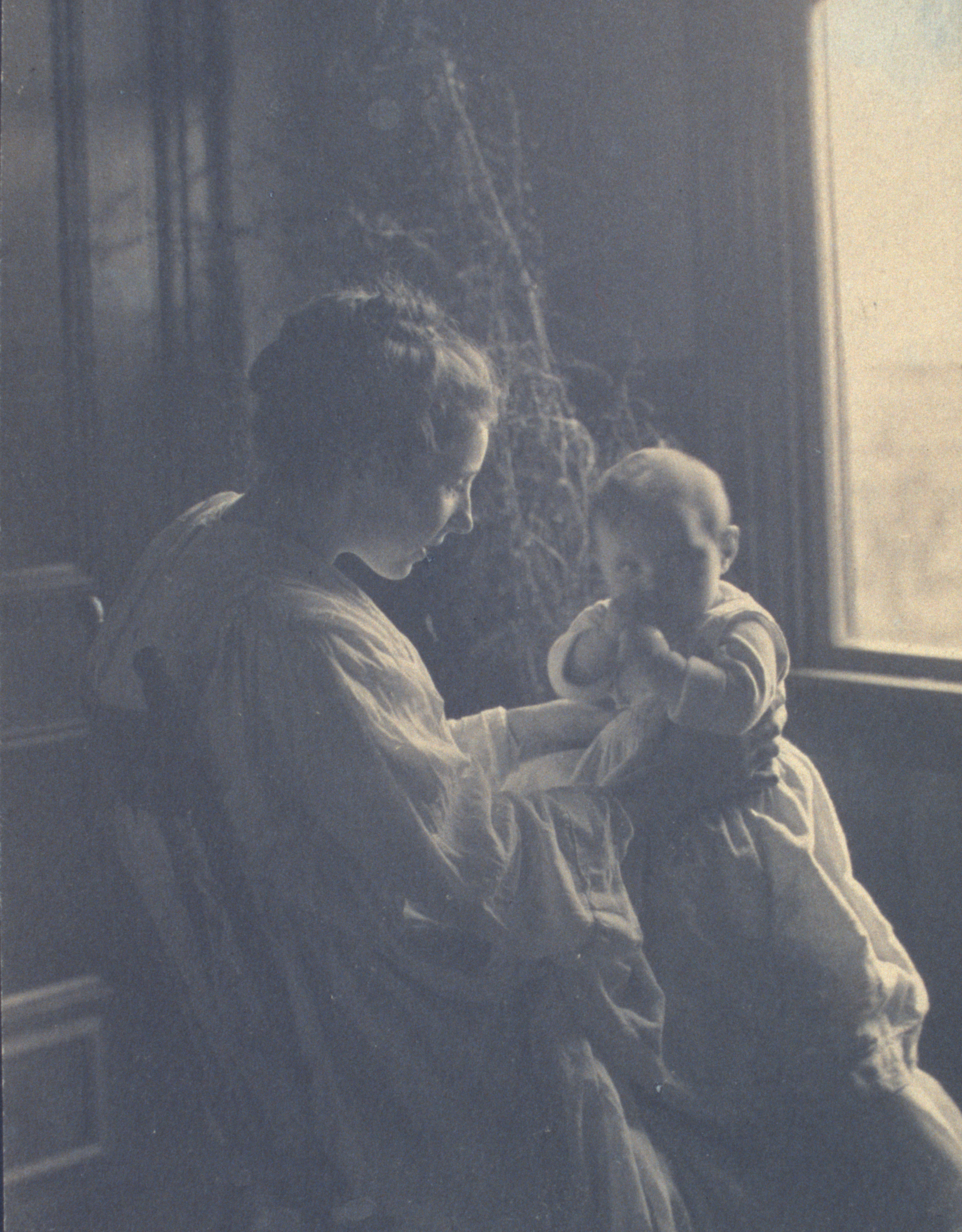
Mother and child
(1900)

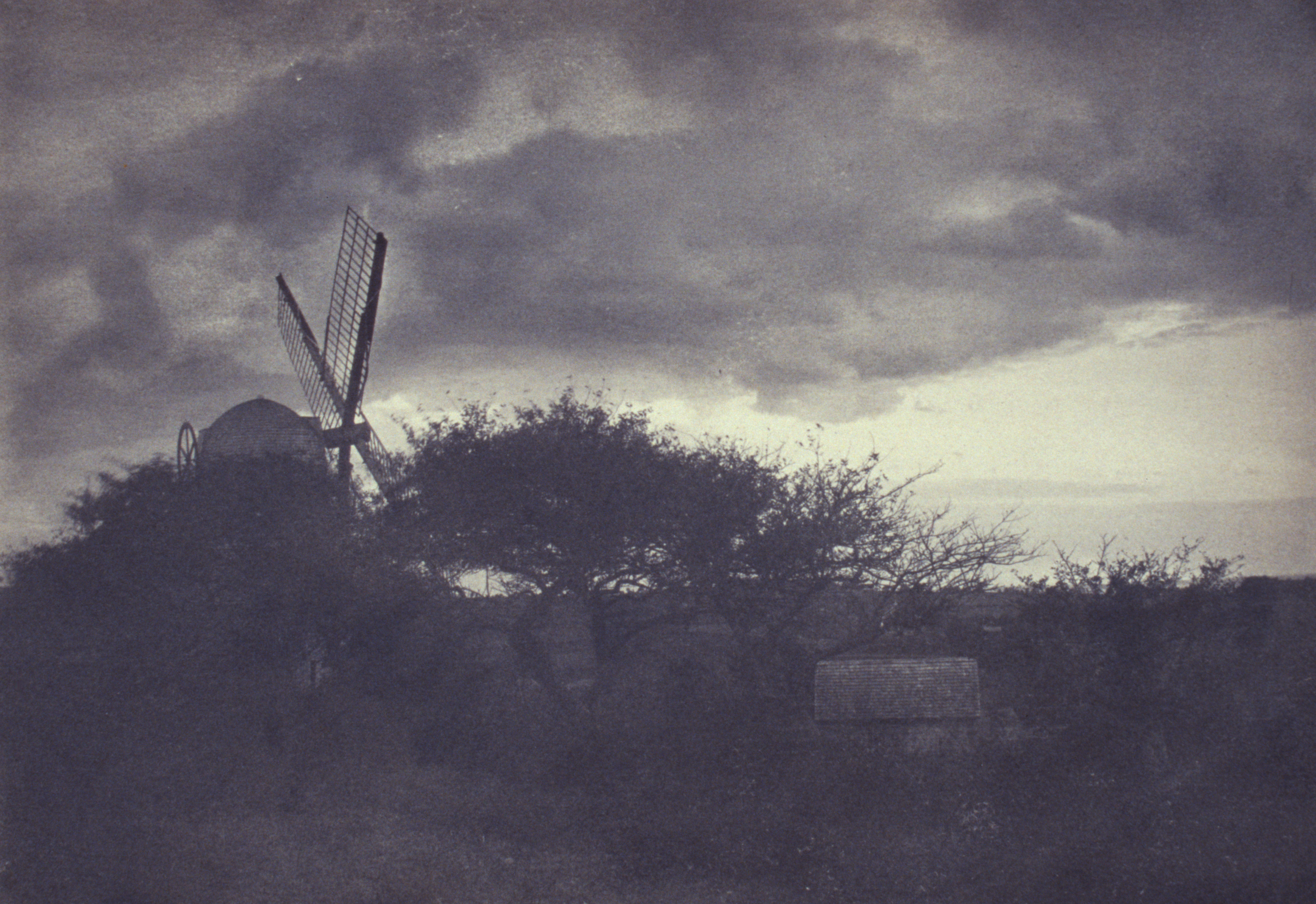
The old mill
(1900)

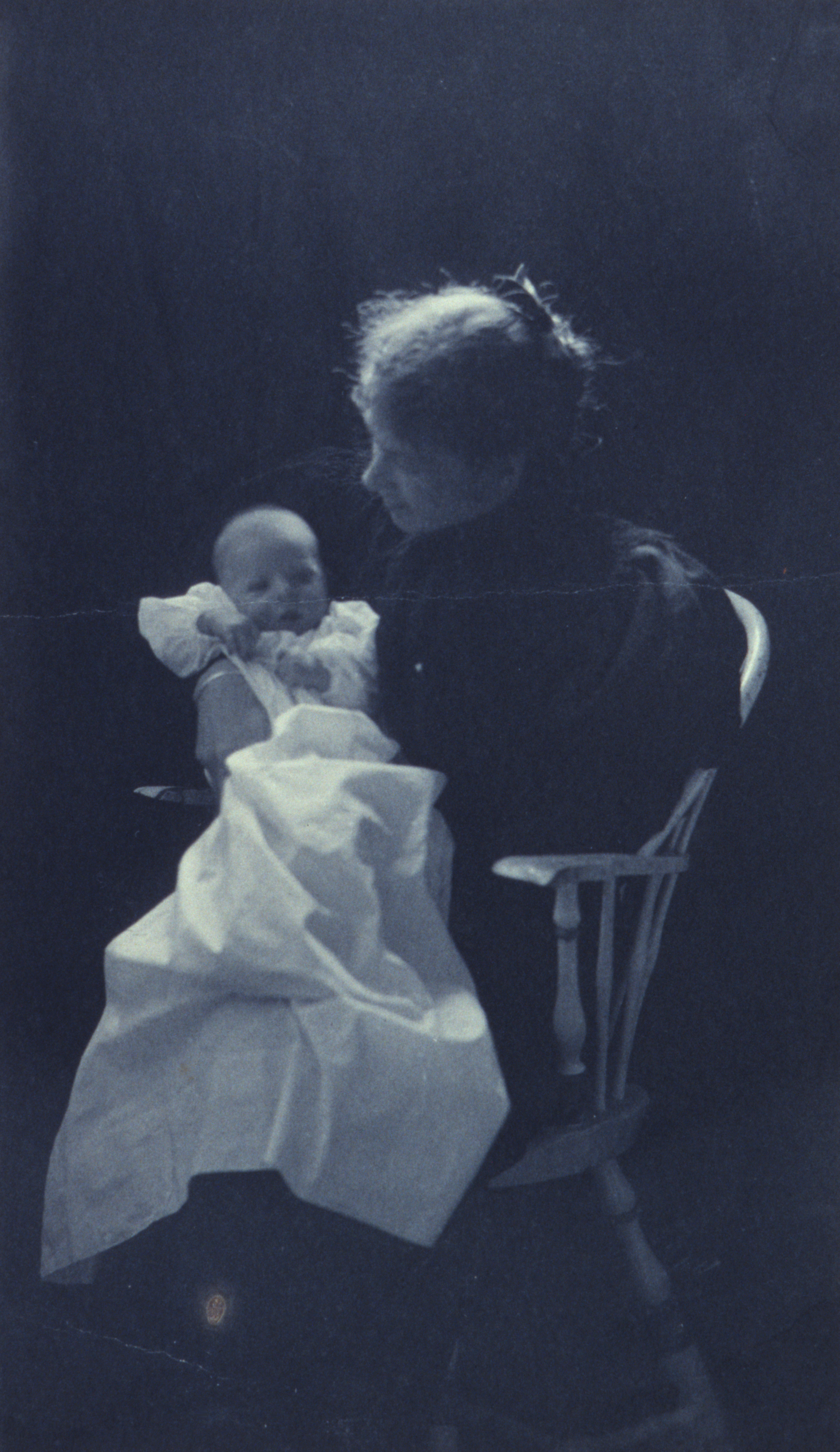
Woman sitting in chair holding an infant
(1900)

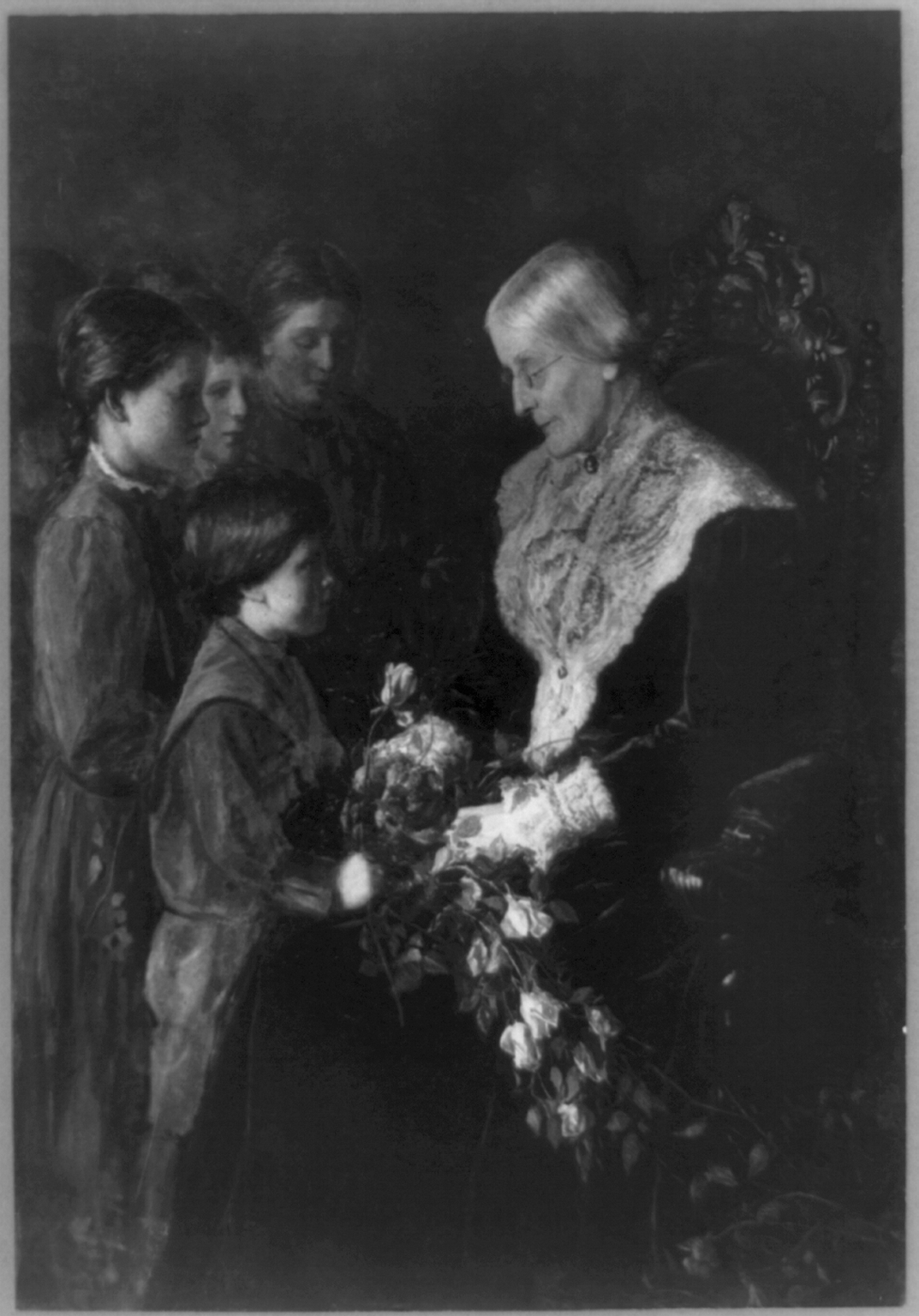
Susan B Anthony
80th Birthday
(1903)

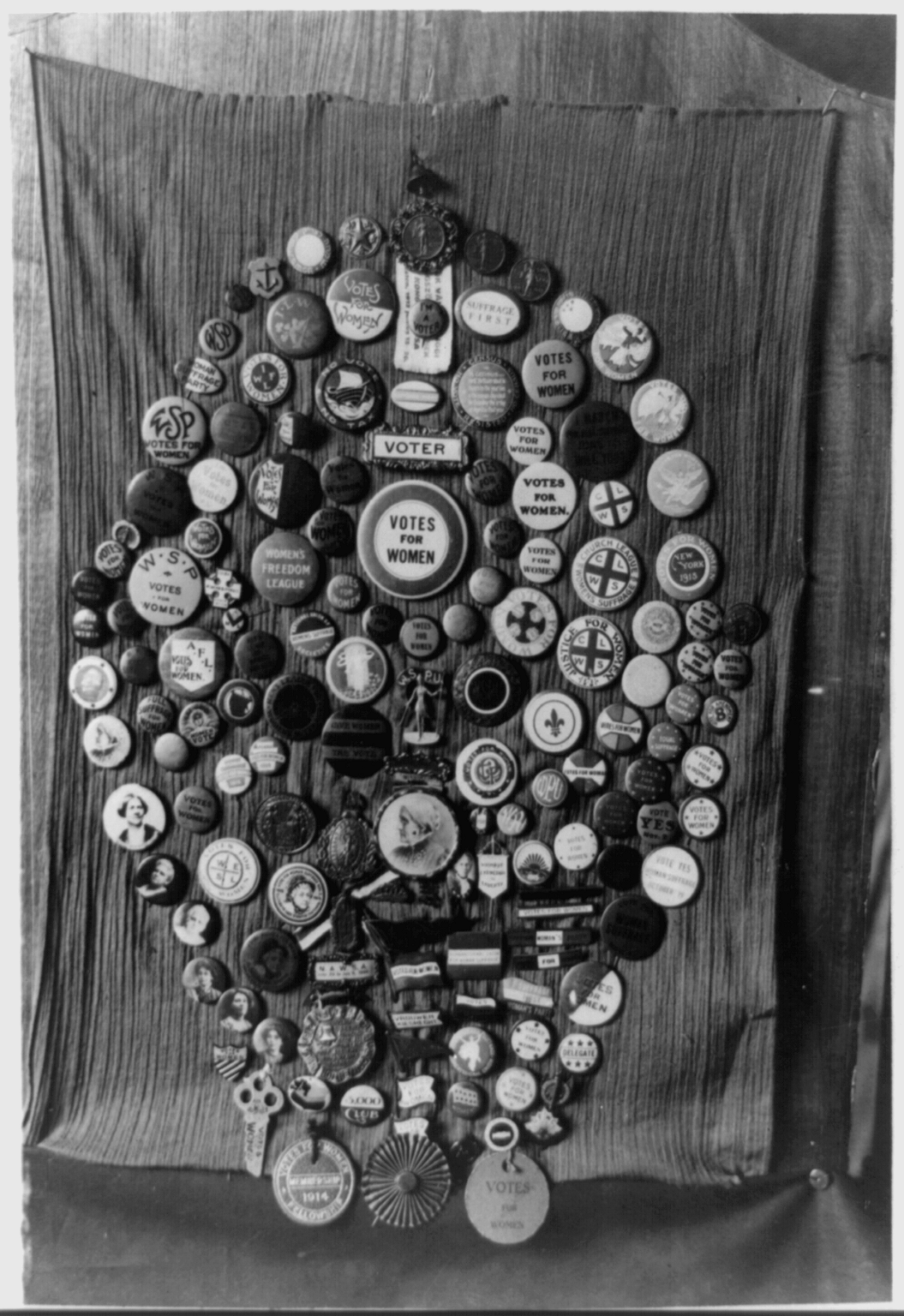
Votes for women buttons
by Mrs. Alice Park
(1922)

=== Selections from Alexander and some other cats (1929) ===
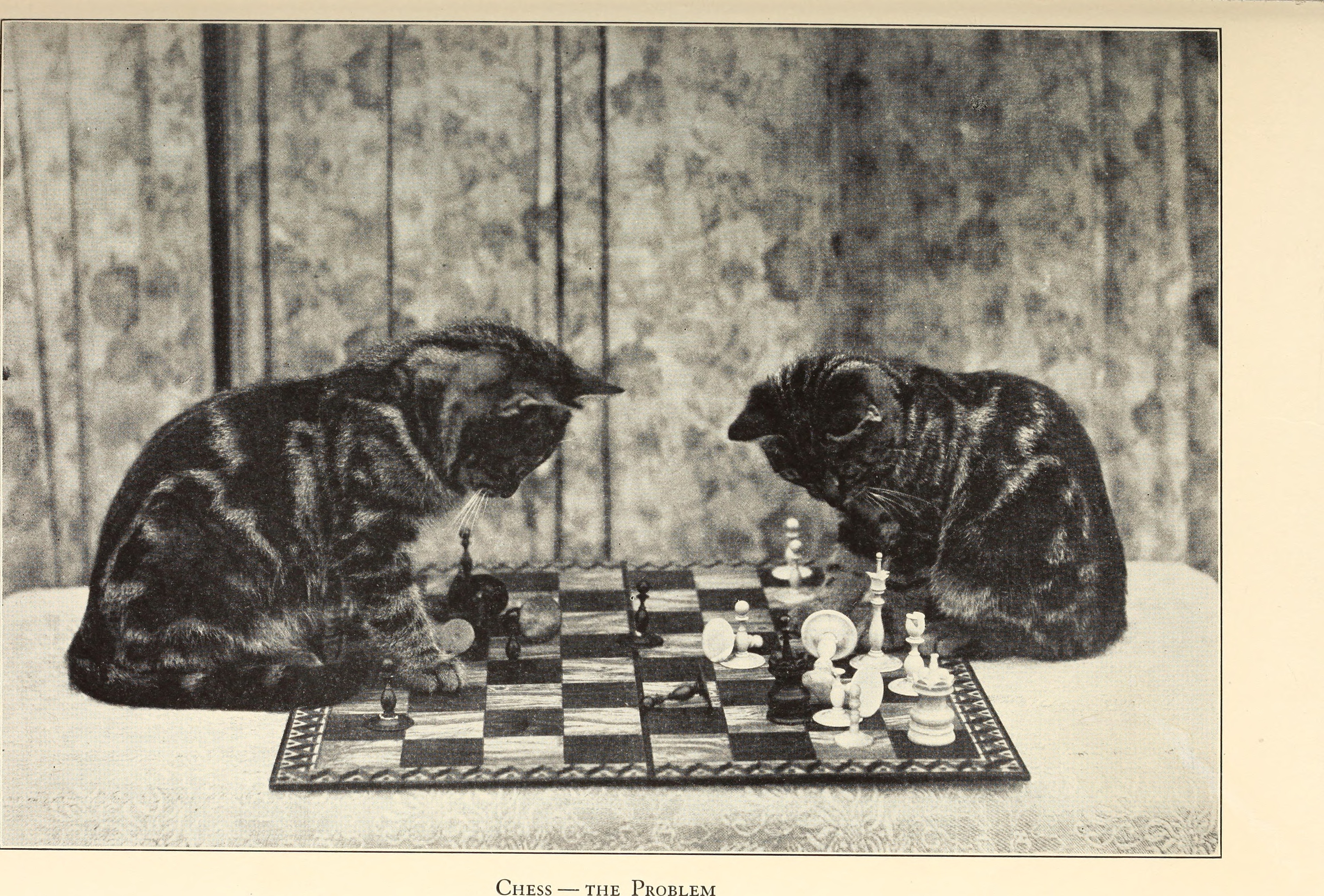
Chess – The Problem

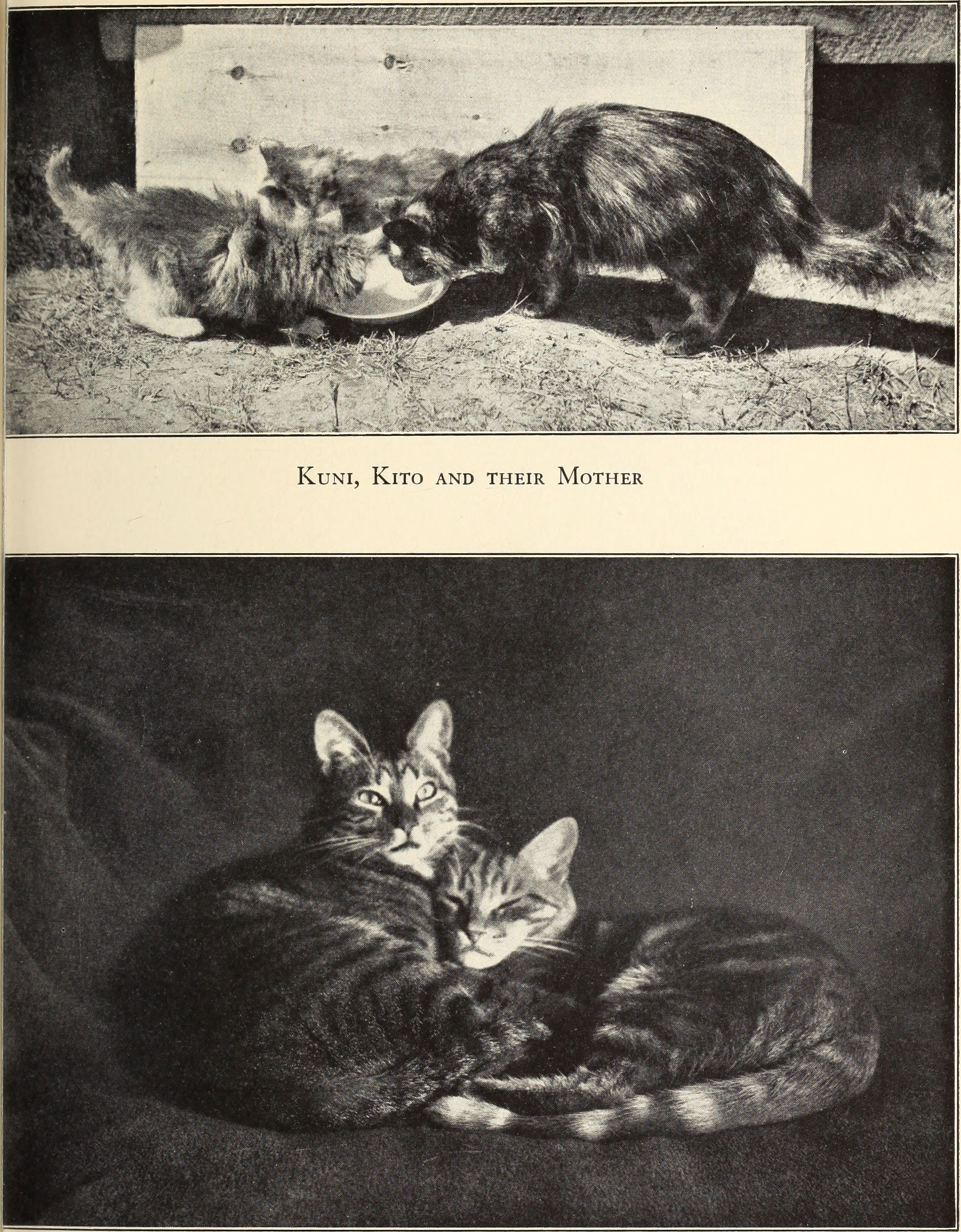
Kuni, Kito and Their Mother

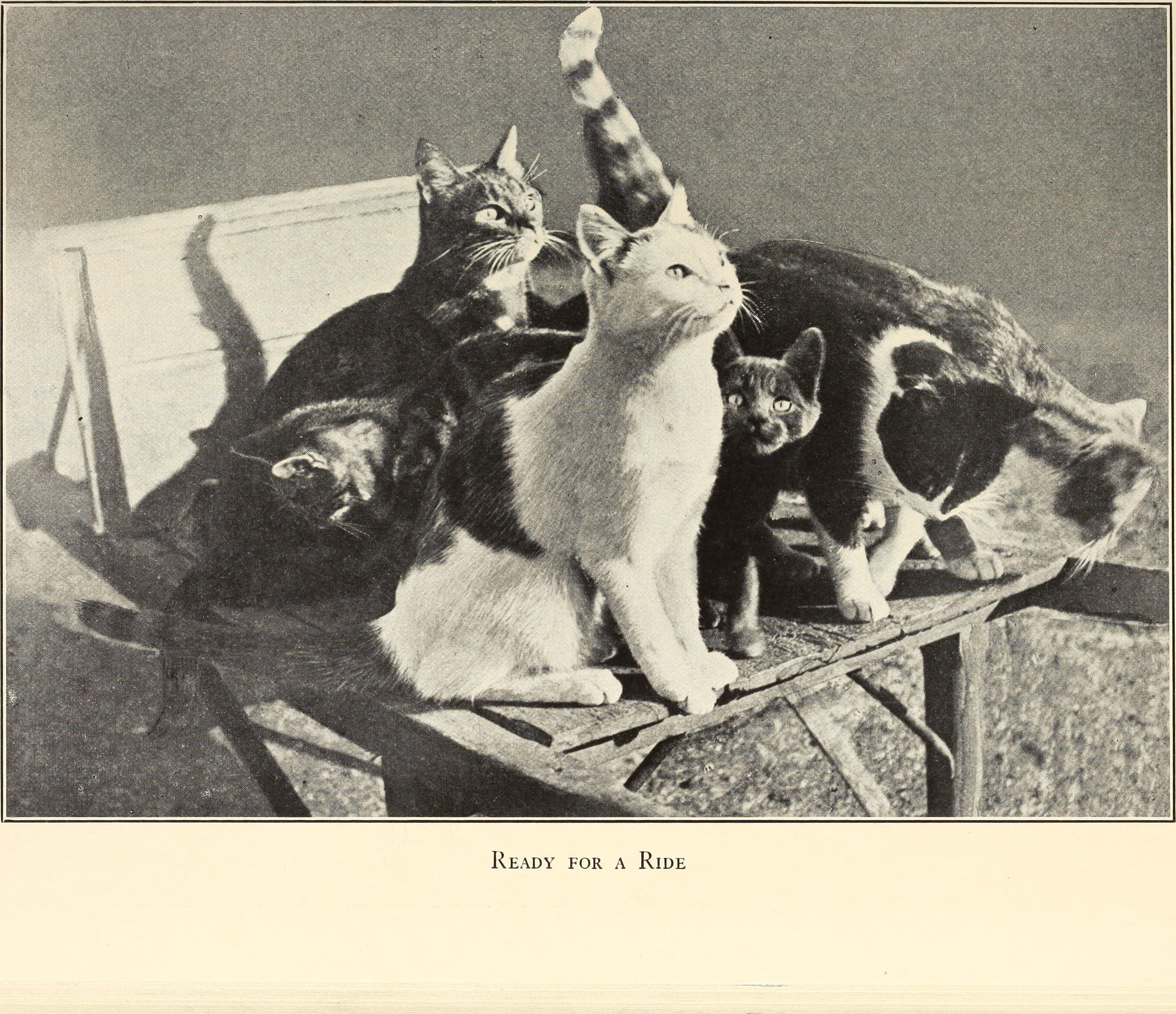
Ready for a Ride

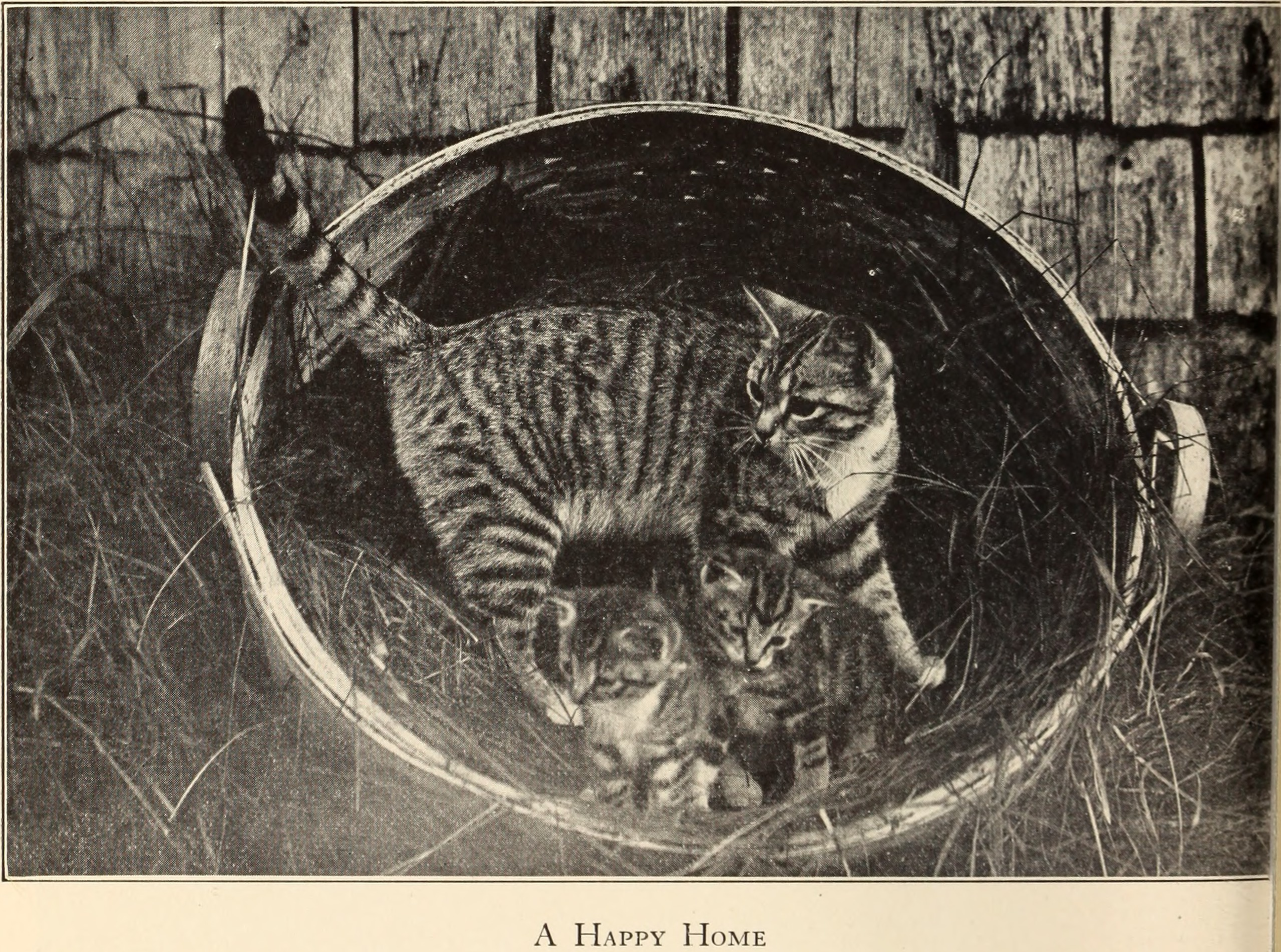
A Happy Home

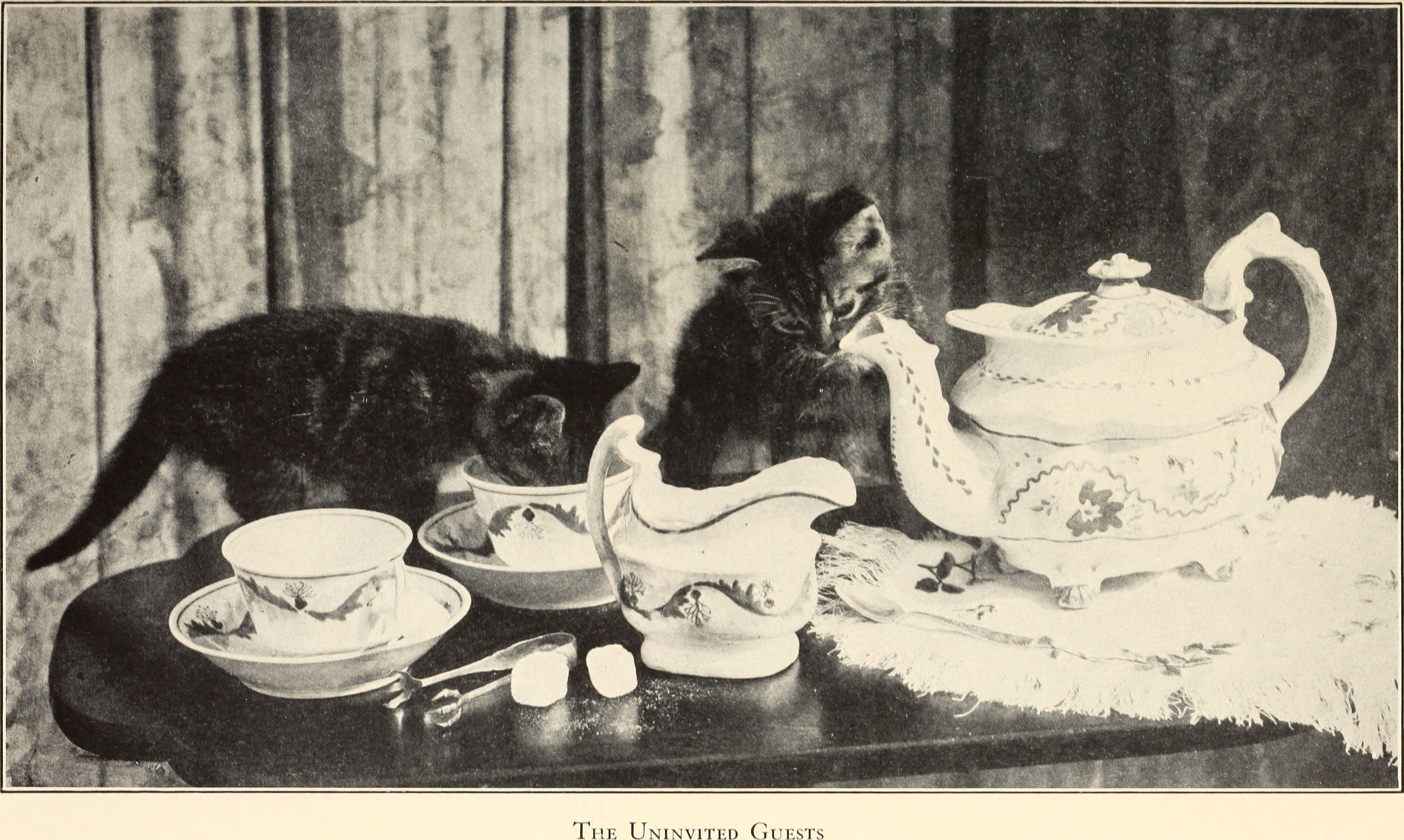
The Uninvited Guests

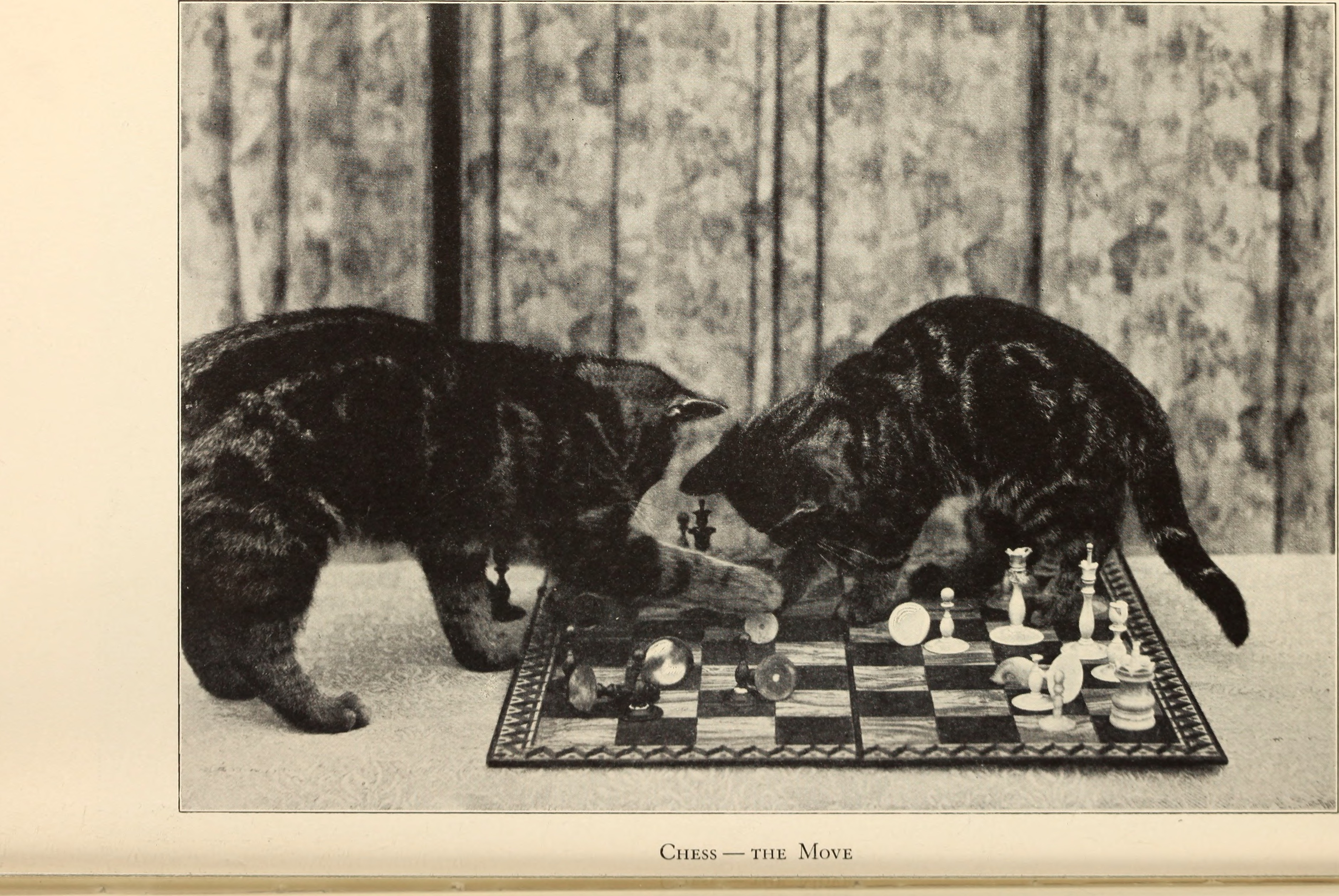
Chess – The Move

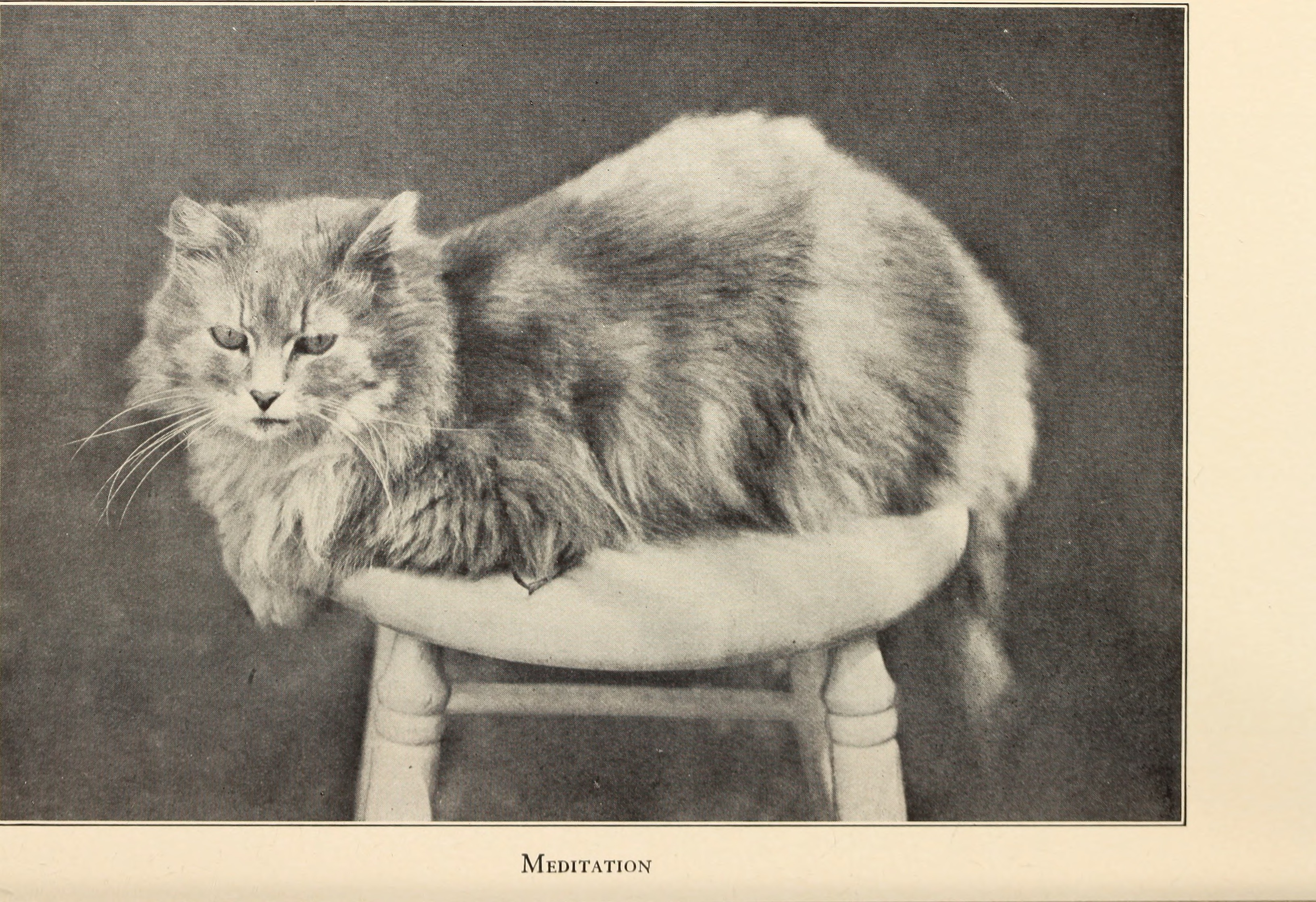
Meditation

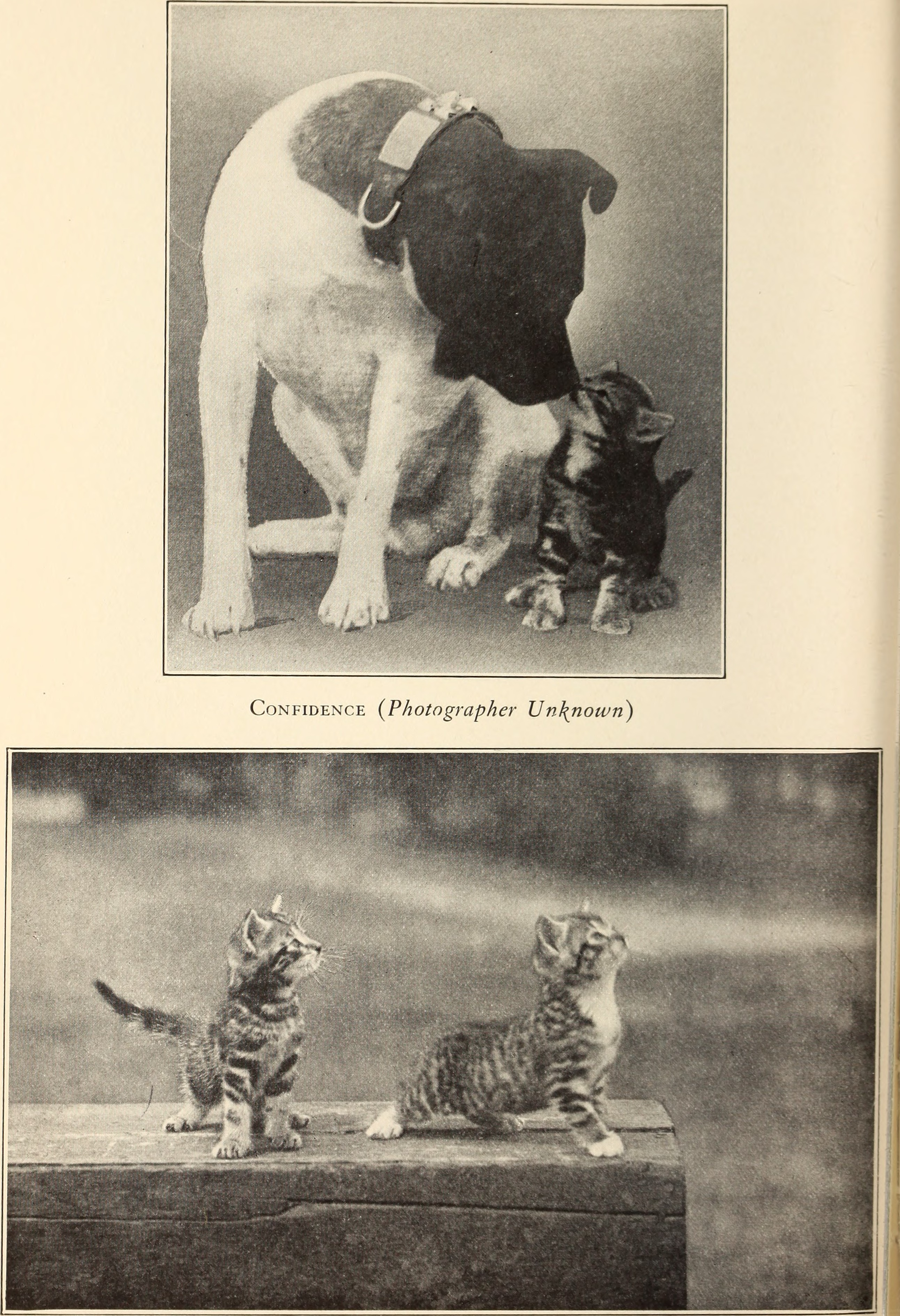
Confidence

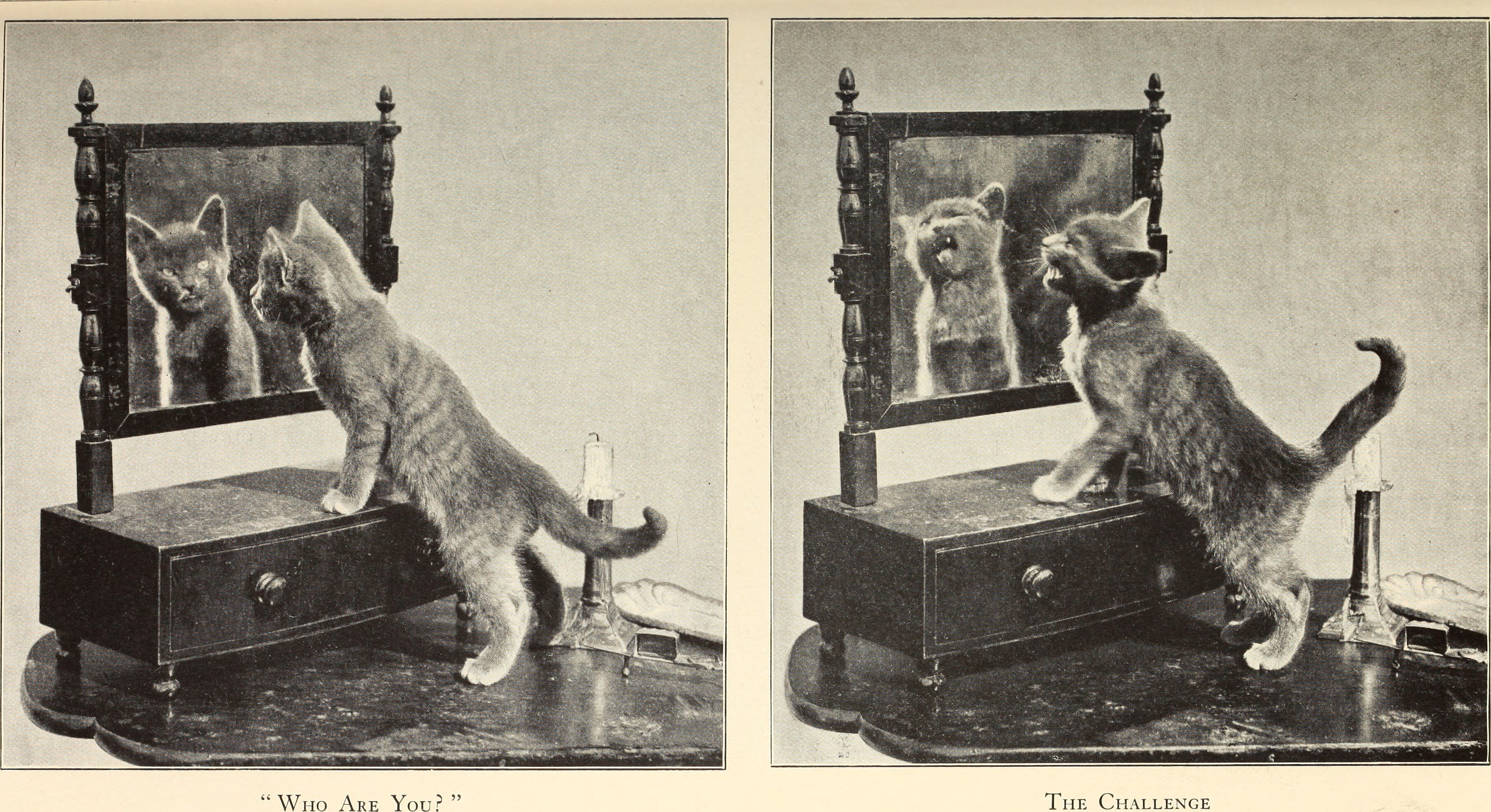
"Who Are You?" / The Challenge

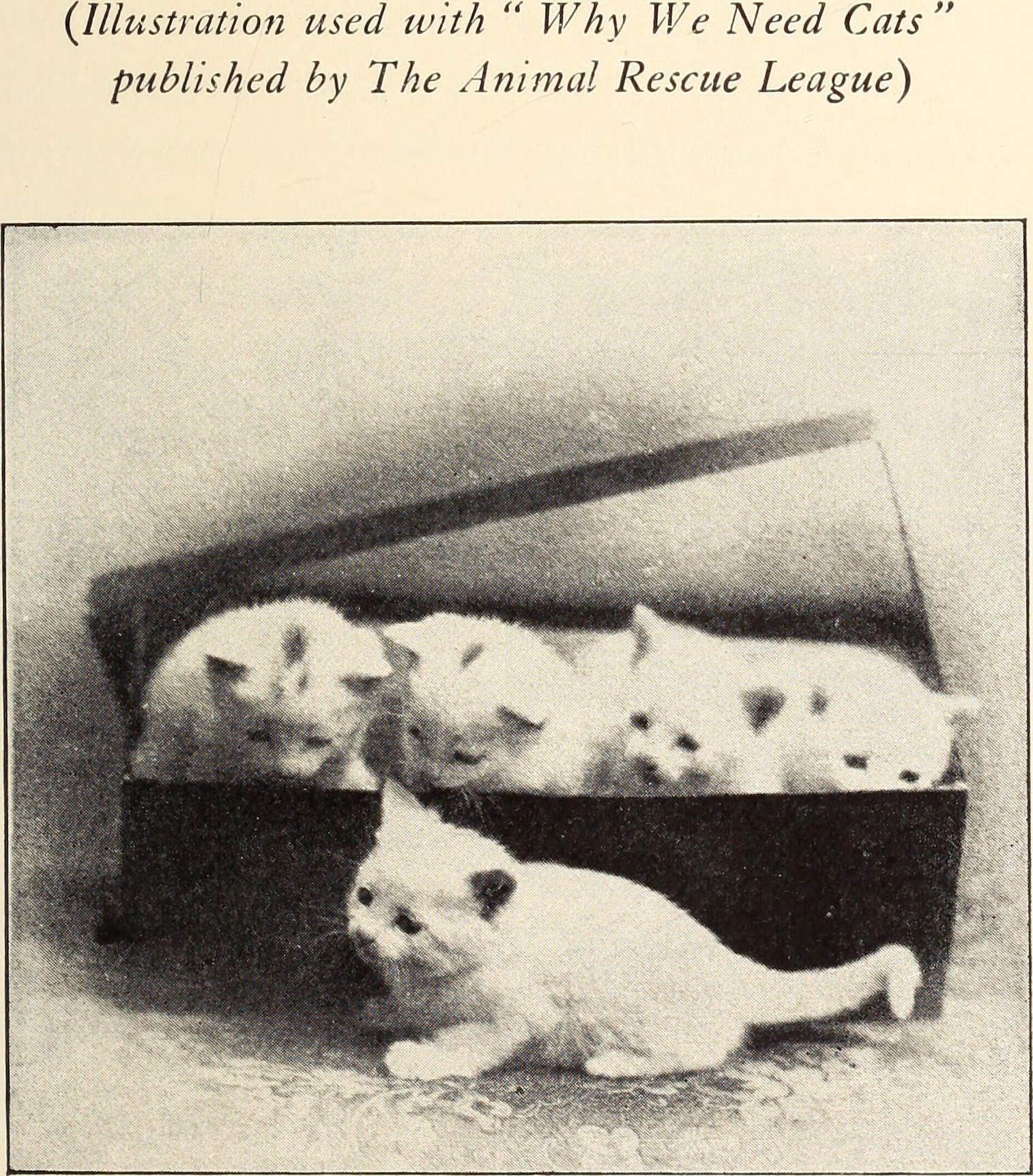
Illustration used with "Why We Need Cats" published by The Animal Rescue League

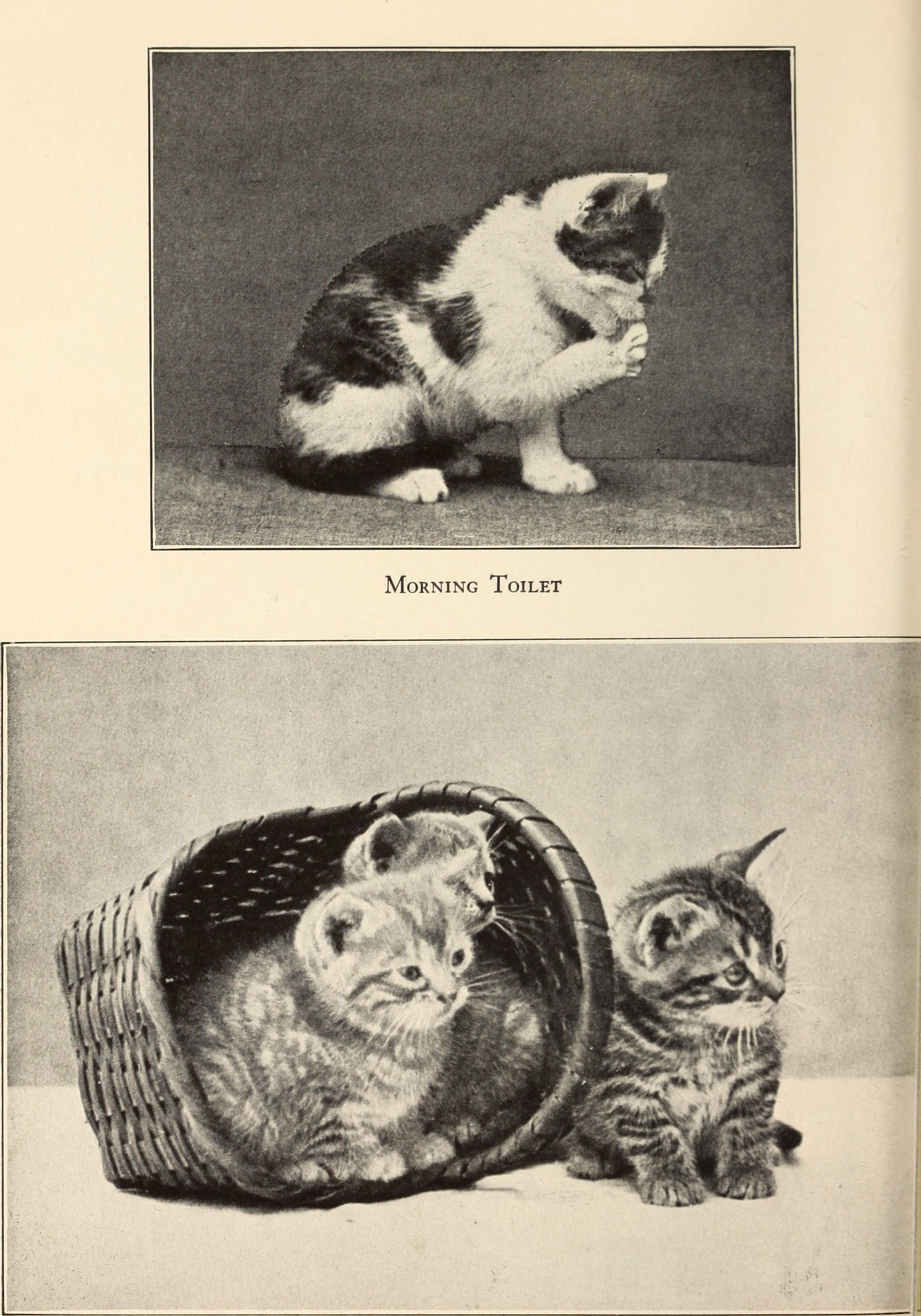
Morning Toilet

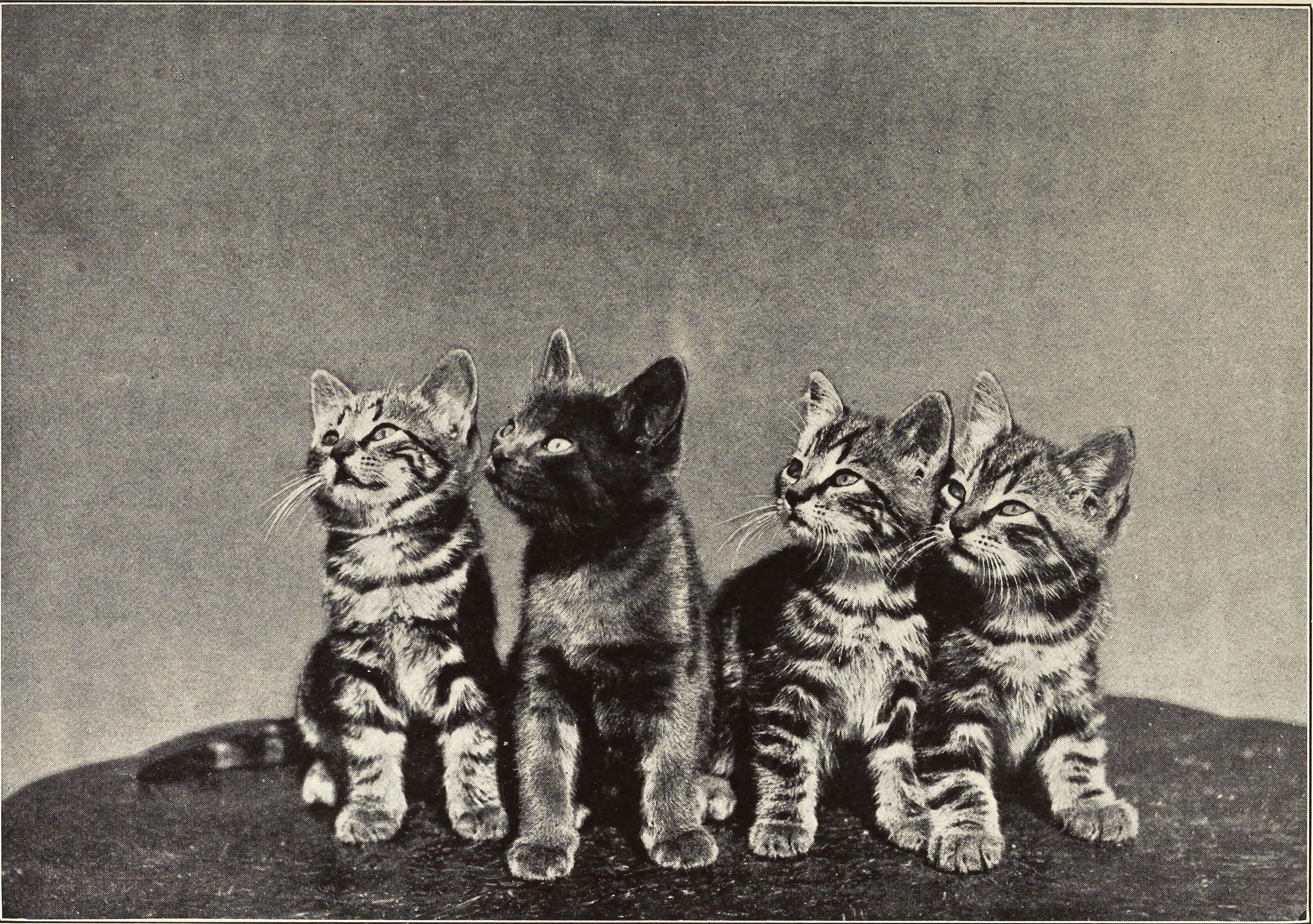
A Quartette

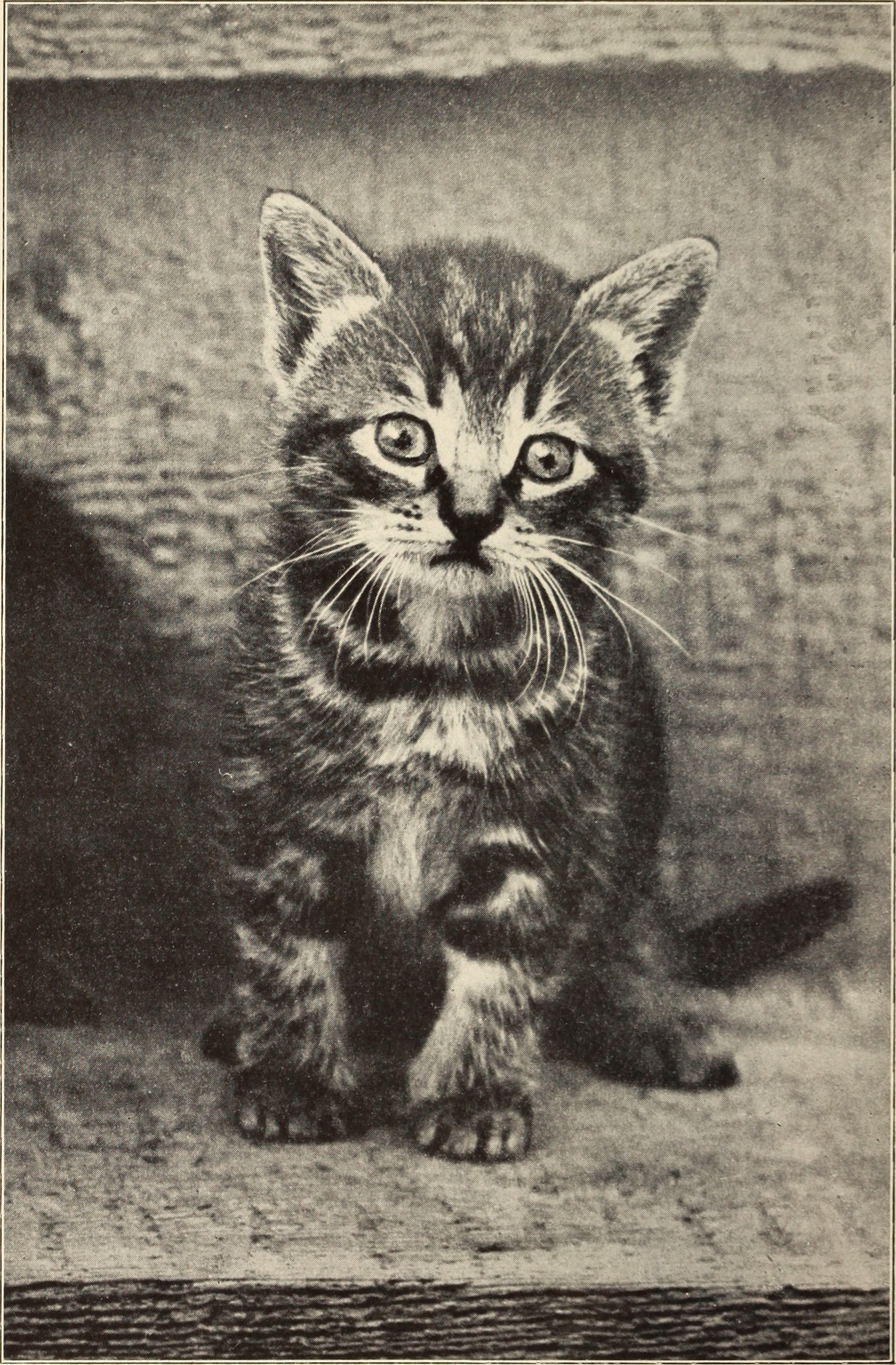
Surprise

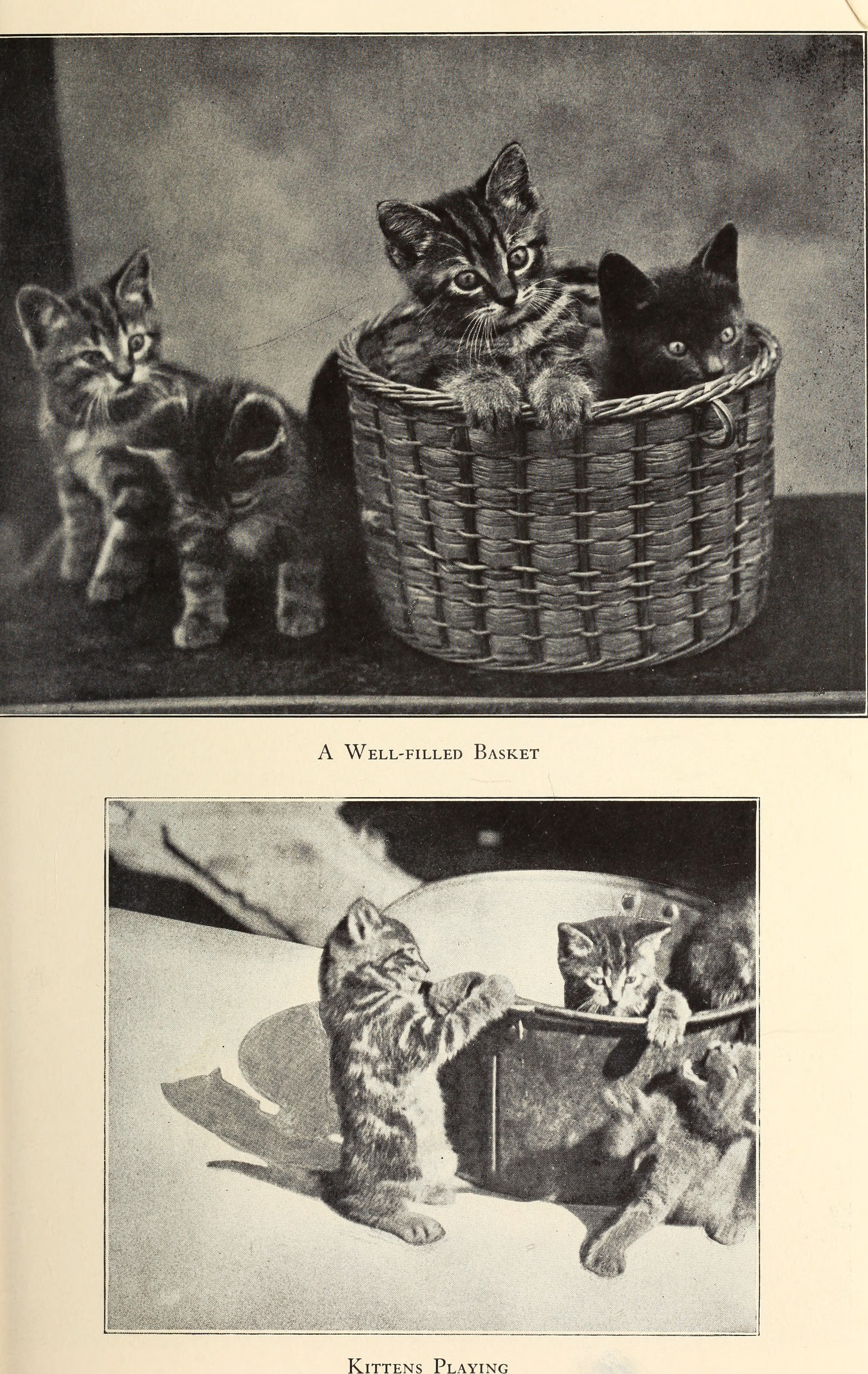
A Well-Filled Basket

== Works and publications ==
- Eddy, Sarah J. (1897). Songs of Happy Life For Schools, Homes, and Bands of Mercy. Providence: Art and Nature Study Pub. Co. OCLC 863660658.
- Eddy, Sarah J. (March 1900). "The Robin's Nest". New England Magazine: An Illustrated Monthly. New Series, Vol. 22. Boston, Mass.: Warren F. Kellogg: 161–171. OCLC 41900566. "Illustrated from photographs by the author"
- Eddy, Sarah J. (1900). Friends and Helpers. Boston: Ginn & Co. OCLC 463812695.. Translated in spanish in Amigos y auxiliares del hombre, Boston : Ginn & Company, 1901. Reading on HathiTrust.
- Eddy, Sarah J. (1929). Alexander and Some Other Cats. Boston: Marshall Jones Co. OCLC 44679562.
- Eddy, Sarah J. (1938). Happy Cats and Their Care. Norwood, Mass: Privately printed by the Plimpton Press. OCLC 39081170.
