= William Leffingwell (New York politician) =

William Elderkin Leffingwell (July 10, 1855 – October 13, 1927) was an American politician.

William Leffingwell was the youngest son of physician Elisha Leffingwell, and brother of Albert Leffingwell, born in Aurora, Cayuga County, New York, on July 10, 1855. After graduating from the Cayuga Lake Academy, he enrolled at Cornell University, then later transferred to the Polytechnic Institute of Brooklyn. Upon graduation, Leffingwell worked for the financial and registrar’s office for seven years, from 1875 to 1882. He later became secretary and treasurer of the Dansville Sanitarium, until that institution burned down. Leffingwell then established the Glen Springs Sanitarium.

While a resident of Dansville, Livingston County, New York, Leffingwell served as village president in 1884. In 1899, he began serving on the board of trustees of Watkins Glen, New York. By 1901, he had been elevated to president of the board, and the following year, became the first president of the village itself, after the village charter had been amended. Leffingwell served in the 132nd New York State Legislature, as a Democratic member of the New York State Assembly from Schuyler County.

Leffingwell died at home in Watkins Glen on October 13, 1927, of heart failure.
