= Jackson Homestead =

Historic building in Newton, Massachusetts

- U.S. National Register of Historic Places
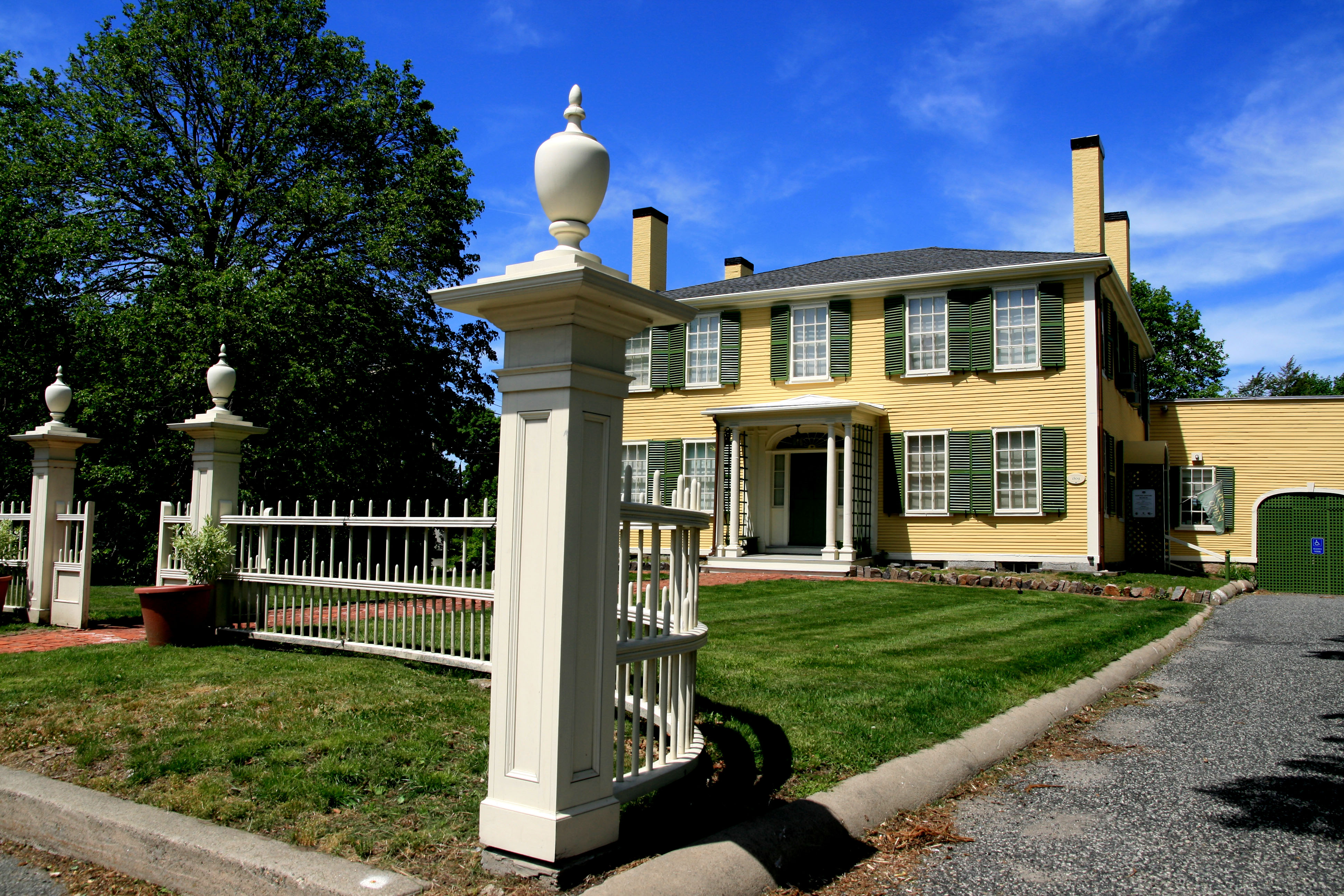
- Jackson Homestead

- Location within Massachusetts Location within the United States
- Location: Newton, Massachusetts
- Coordinates: 42°21′19″N 71°11′43″W
- Built: 1809
- Architectural style: Federal
- NRHP reference No.: 73000306
- Added to NRHP: June 4, 1973

The Jackson Homestead, located at 527 Washington Street, in the village of Newton Corner, in Newton, Massachusetts, is an historic house that served as a station on the Underground Railroad before the Civil War.

It was built in 1809 in the Federal style by Timothy Jackson (1756–1814) on his family's farm. His son William Jackson (1783–1855) lived in it from 1820 until his death. William Jackson was an abolitionist and was active in politics on the local, state and national levels and served in the United States Congress from 1833 to 1837. The home was occupied by his family until 1932 when it was rented out. In 1949 it was given to the city of Newton and in 1950 the Newton History Museum was established there.

== History ==
In 1646, Edward Jackson bought a 500-acre farm which covered much of Newton Corner and Newtonville. In about 1670, he built a house on the side of east side of Smelt Brook, on the site of the present Homestead. The south-facing house was a saltbox: two stories in front and one at the back, originally 22 by 18 feet. There were two kitchens and a bedroom on the lower floor, two chambers on the second, and two further bedrooms in the attic. The house, which was never painted, either inside or out, took water from a well sheltered by a large elm tree. 17 feet were added to the house either by Edward's son Sebas or, later, by his grandson, Joseph. As was not uncommon, there were always two generations living in the house, and the addition was probably to provide for a second family.

In 1809, Major Timothy Jackson decided to replace the old homestead with "a fine house for the (modern) times". He designed and helped build a large, two-family house, hoping that his youngest son, Edmund, would possibly move into it if he married. The house was a great improvement on the original, featuring such improvements as an inside well, a laundry, storeroom and ell, magnificent fireplaces with huge mantelpieces, a great staircase and airy, small private bedchambers on the second floor, with a large, useful garrett extending on top of the entire house. Timothy Jackson had built what is now known today as the Jackson Homestead.

After Timothy Jr's death, his estate was divided among his sons. William Jackson struck deals with his brothers, buying the shares from Edmund and George, and made a "division" with Francis and Stephen, according to which they took the land to the south of Washington street and he received the homestead and everything to the north. Adjustments were made to the house, most notably the creation and splitting of bedrooms, to accommodate the large family, the house was painted yellow with the same cream trim and green shutters the Homestead has today, and central heating would eventually be installed in the 1830s.

By the 1900s, the Jackson Homestead began using municipal water rather from their indoor well. Under the direction of Louise Keith, William's granddaughter, major renovations were carried out. Modern plumbing was installed in the bathroom and kitchen, all of which were connected to the city sewers. Wooden ceiling beams were reinforced with iron braces and seventy-six new panels of glass were installed. The interior of the house was repainted, and the exterior of the house was painted white for the first time.

In 1949, Frances (Hatch) Paine, gave the homestead to the City of Newton for educational, recreational, and other public purposes. The Homestead became the CIty Museum, and a number of changes have been made, most notably the remodelling of the ell in 1966.

== Current status ==
Today, the Jackson Homestead has transitioned into a museum known as the Jackson Homestead and Museum. It is operated by Historic Newton, whose mission is to "inspire discovery and engagement by illuminating our community's stories within the context of American history". The Jackson Homestead and Museum displays rotating and permanent exhibits about the history of Newton, Massachusetts, and the Underground Railroad. The Homestead is also home to the archives of Historic Newton.

On June 4, 1973, the Jackson Homestead was added to the National Register of Historic Places.

== See also ==
- Francis Jackson (abolitionist)
- List of Underground Railroad sites
- Capt. Edward Durant House
- East Parish Burying Ground
- National Register of Historic Places listings in Newton, Massachusetts
