= Francis Jackson (abolitionist) =

American abolitionist

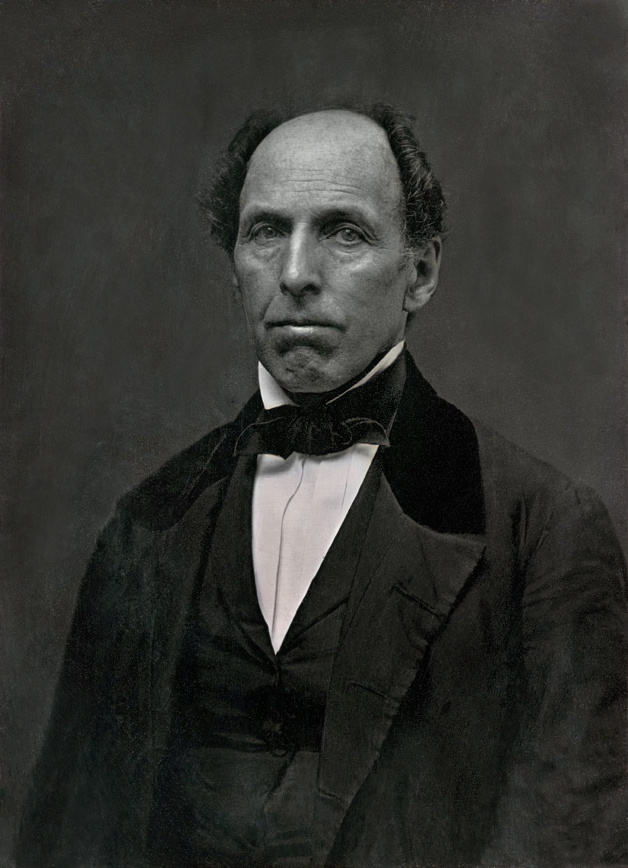
Portrait of Francis Jackson, c. 1850 (Boston Public Library)

Francis Jackson (1789–1861) was an abolitionist in Boston, Massachusetts. He was president of the Massachusetts Anti-Slavery Society for many years, was also president of the New England Anti-Slavery Conventions, and vice president of the American Anti-Slavery Society. He was also affiliated with the Boston Female Anti-Slavery Society and the Boston Vigilance Committee. He worked for the South Cove Corporation, filling in land in Boston's South End in the 1830s.

== Biography ==
Jackson was born in Newton, Massachusetts to Timothy Jackson (1756–1814), who fought in the American Revolutionary War and later built the Jackson Homestead in Newton. Siblings included Edmund Jackson, George Jackson, Stephen Jackson, Lucretia Jackson, and politician William Jackson, who was also against slavery.

Francis Jackson served on the Boston City Council in 1823–1824 (common council, Ward 12) and 1826 (alderman). In 1832 he held the position of "Land Commissioner" for the city of Boston. He lived on Washington Street (c. 1823), Tremont Street (c. 1832) and Hollis Street (c. 1848–1861).

He worked for the South Cove Corporation c. 1833–1840. In Boston "by 1830 the population had increased so much that it was felt that the time had come when more room was needed, and soon afterwards the first grand real estate enterprise was inaugurated by the filling up of the South Cove. The company was chartered Jan. 31st, 1833, and $415,000 (~$14.3 million in 2024) was subscribed. The work was begun May 3rd, 1834, under the management of Mr. Francis Jackson, and finished in November 1837. Seventy-seven acres of good land were thus added."

As an abolitionist, Jackson assisted fugitive slaves: "he sheltered many in a room of his house, at Number 31 Hollis Street." He was involved with the trial of Anthony Burns in 1854. In 1854 and 1856 he "was called upon to preside" over the New England Anti-Slavery Convention held at the Melodeon.

Jackson was a close friend of Wm. Lloyd Garrison, and contributed financially to Garrison's newspaper, The Liberator.

In his will, Jackson left considerable funds to abolitionist and women's suffragist efforts, and wrote about Massachusetts:

Disregarding the self-evident declaration of 1776, repeated in her own constitution of 1780, that 'all men are born free and equal,' Massachusetts has since, in the face of those solemn declarations, deliberately entered into a conspiracy with other states, to aid in enslaving millions of innocent persons. I have long labored to help my native state out of her deep iniquity, and her barefaced hypocrisy in the matter; I now enter my last protest against her inconsistency, her injustice, and her cruelty, toward an unoffending people. God save the fugitive slave that escapes to her borders, whatever may become of the Commonwealth of Massachusetts.

Jackson also left money to fellow abolitionists and activists Charles C. Burleigh, Lydia Maria Child, Stephen S. Foster, Francis Jackson Garrison, William Lloyd Garrison (whose son, Francis Jackson Garrison, was named after him), Oliver Johnson, Parker Pillsbury, Charles Lenox Remond, Lucy Stone, Robert F. Walcott and Charles K. Whipple.

Slavery was legally abolished by the 13th Amendment just four years after Jackson's death. Some of his relatives, led by his brother Edmund, tried to demolish his anti-slavery trust. However, citing the cy-près doctrine, Justice Horace Gray denied the relatives' claim and converted the trust into an educational charity for former slaves, to better their living condition.

Jackson had three children. His daughter Eliza F. Meriam Eddy (née Eliza Frances Jackson) had two sons and a daughter from her first marriage. One of them, Francis Jackson Meriam (1837-1865) was also in the anti-slavery cause. He joined John Brown in his insurrection against slavers despite being already blind in one eye. Eliza's daughter was the photographer and suffragette, Sarah J. Eddy.

== Images ==
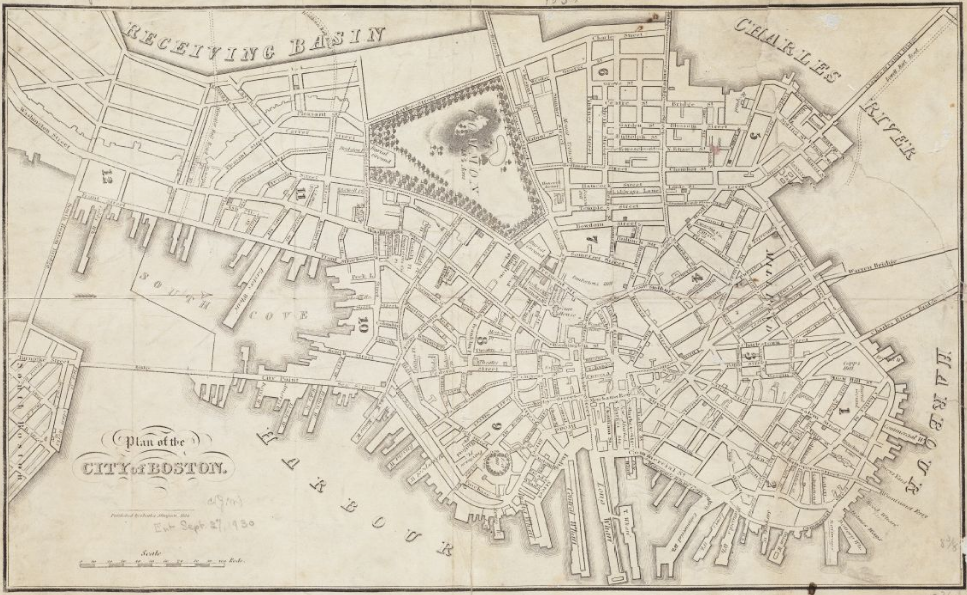
Boston in 1834, prior to filling in the South Cove

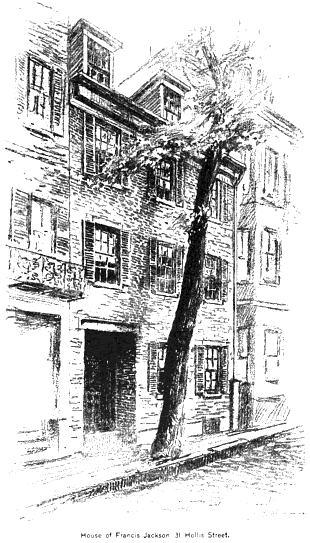
Jackson's house, Hollis Street, Boston, 19th century

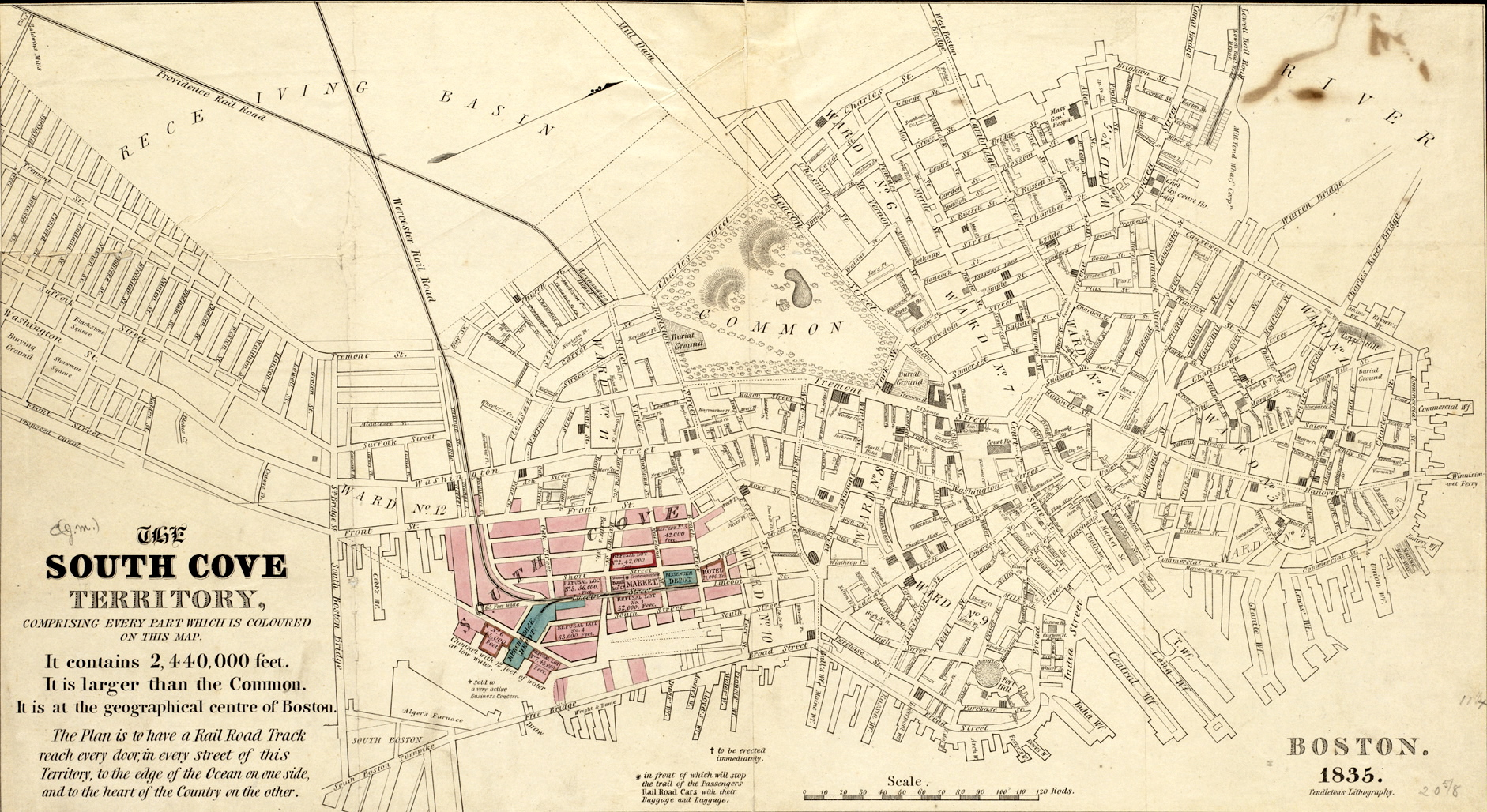
South Cove, Boston, 1835

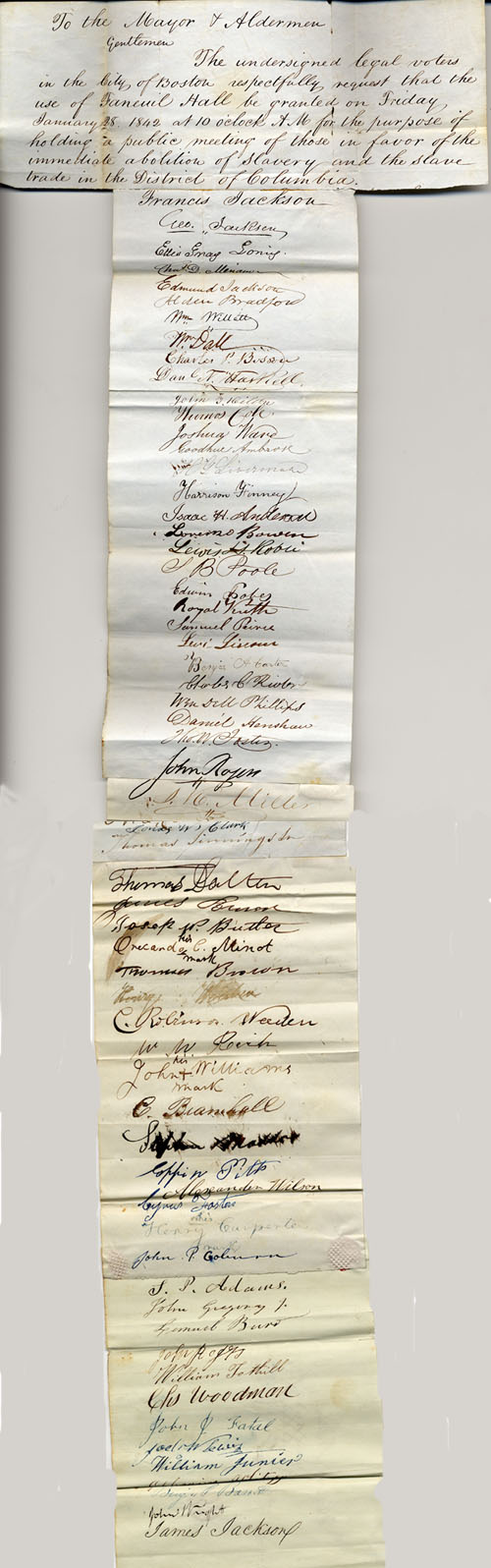
Petition of Francis Jackson and others in favor of abolition of slavery for the use of Faneuil Hall, 1842 (Boston City Clerk Archives and Records Management Division)

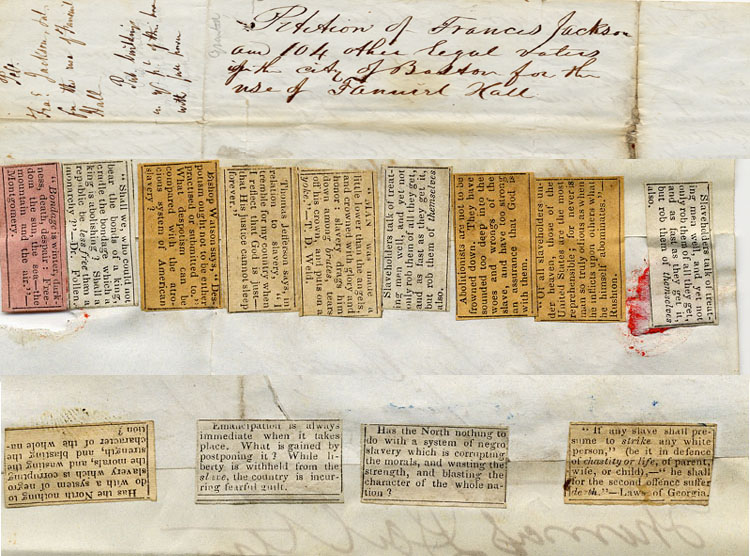
Petition for use of Faneuil Hall, 1842 (Boston City Clerk Archives and Records Management Division)

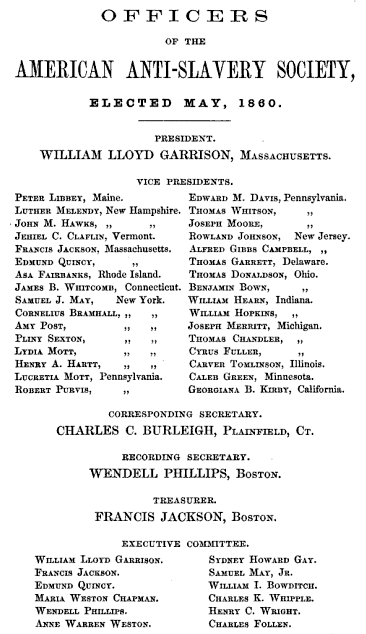
Officers of the American Anti-Slavery Society, 1860

== See also ==
- Jackson Homestead, Newton, Mass.
