= William Jackson (Massachusetts politician, born 1783) =

American politician

Member of the U.S. House of Representatives from Massachusetts's 9th district
- In office March 4, 1833 – March 3, 1837
- Preceded by: George N. Briggs
- Succeeded by: William Soden Hastings

Personal details
- Born: September 2, 1783 Newton, Massachusetts
- Died: February 27, 1855 (aged 71) Newton, Massachusetts
- Party: Anti-Masonic
- Occupation: Banker

William Jackson (September 2, 1783 – February 27, 1855) was a United States representative from Massachusetts who lived at the Jackson Homestead.

== Early life ==
He was born in Newton on September 2, 1783. He attended the district school, where his father, Timothy Jackson, had taught. When he was fifteen, just a few years before his father's death in 1815, he was unfortunate to be stricken with a severe leg injury which would lame him for life. Timothy was in a slight but steady decline, and William had a high chance of dying or becoming an invalid, both of which would dash his hopes of becoming a wealthy, famous scholar or politician. However, that winter, the Newton library had opened, Timothy was unusually healthy, and William reported to have learned more than he ever had in all his years of schooling, curled up in his upstairs bedroom with a stack of useful old tomes.

When he was seventeen, William moved to Boston to work in the soap and candle factory his father had started. He soon gained respect and a reputation, and was shortly the foreman and eventually, the owner.

=== Personal life ===
During his years in Boston, he married a woman named Hannah Woodward. With her he had children Sarah, Timothy, and Marion, and 2 more daughters. After Hannah's death in 1812, when he was only 29 but already a respected figure, William married a woman named Mary Bennett. With her he had a daughter named Frances, unknown sons, unknown daughters, daughters Cornelia, Ellen, and Caroline, and a son named William Ward. Meanwhile, William continued to take new jobs and try new things.

During his time in Boston, Jackson made fortunes, but also lost them. He represented Boston in the General Court, and became deeply involved in the Massachusetts Charitable Mechanic Association and similar enterprises. In about 1820, feeling that his extensive public commitments and jobs were taking a toll on his private life, as he now had a wife and at least twelve children to support, he retired back to Newton, hoping to be a farmer, when he was roughly 37 years old. After Timothy's death, the shares of his property were divided as equally as possible between his sons and Lucretia's survivors. When William moved back to Newton, now a rich, grown man who was well known throughout the Boston area.

== Political career ==
However, he soon found himself to be just as active as ever. By 1825 he was Chairman of the Board of Selectmen. One of the Board's various duties was the licensing and regulation of the "purveyors of ardent liquors", which he refused to grant until the regulations were more strictly enforced. Due almost completely to his influence, and despite horrific unpleasantness, opposition, and threats which terrified the "womenfolk" of his large household, Newton stayed dry and sober that year.

The window into the world of drinking William had gained in just those few months horrified and moved him so much that despite the cautionings of his daughters, he was a prime founder of the Newton chapter of the American Temperance Society, as well as the treasurer and secretary. After over a year of monthly meetings devoted solely to alcohol and temperance, interest waned and the Society was modified to a Lyceum in which all topics were discussed and debated. Almost by accident, William found himself scheduled to give a talk on railroads. Railroads and trains quickly became his lifelong interest, and he was eventually associated and involved with no fewer than seven railway companies and groups. It was due largely to his influence and support that a regular railway service was built between Newton and Boston in 1844, and he was among the first to start planning for the effect of this on real estate and housing values in Newton and Brighton.

In 1832–33, William Jackson represented Newton in the General Court. He became very active in various Anti-Masonic movements and was elected to the Twenty-third and Twenty-fourth United States Congresses (March 4, 1833 – March 3, 1837). He declined to be a candidate for renomination to the Twenty-fifth Congress and resumed his manufacturing pursuits. The anti-Masonic movements collapsed in the next few years, but most of its supporters turned to the anti-slavery Liberty Party, which Jackson was one of the founding members, and would eventually merge with the Free Soil Party. William's association with the abolitionists would eventually lead to the Jackson Homestead being used as an Underground Railroad stop.

== Last years ==
After a few years of moving to Newton, the candle factory became too much for William to manage, and he transitioned the business to his son, Timothy, and his nephew, Otis Trowbridge. William participated in a full range of town committees, meetings, and activities, especially education and religion. He was deeply religious at this point, although he had not been throughout his childhood, teens, and young adulthood. William served as secretary of the Newton Female Academy, and was active in the Sabbath Schools, Deacon of the First Church, and Deacon of the Eliot Church, which he helped to found, as an end to a full and prosperous career.

Jackson served as president of the American Missionary Society from 1846 to 1854, and he was publisher of a newspaper. Another result of the Newton Temperance Movement was the Newton Savings Bank, later to become the National Savings Bank, designed to help men save money as an alternative to spending it on liquor. William Jackson was its first president from its founding in 1848 until his death. He died in Newton on February 27, 1855. Interment was in the Old Burial Ground, East Parish Burying Ground.

== See also ==
- Francis Jackson (abolitionist)
- Jackson Homestead

U.S. House of Representatives
Preceded by George N. Briggs	Member of the U.S. House of Representatives from Massachusetts's 9th congressional district 1833-1837	Succeeded by William S. Hastings
