= Douglas Leffingwell =

American politician (1826–1900)

Douglas Leffingwell (May 17, 1826 – April 3, 1900) was an American politician.

He was born in Ellsworth, Ohio, on May 17, 1826. Between 1946 and 1852, he lived in New York, and was active in the Mercantile Library Association. Leffingwell returned to Ohio and studied law in Cleveland. Upon passing the bar in 1858, Leffingwell moved to McGregor, Iowa. When the American Civil War broke out in 1861, he organized a company that saw action in the Battle of Shiloh, where Leffingwell was injured. Leffingwell married McGregor native Sara Josephine Vanderwerker in 1865.

Politically, Leffingwell was an Independent Republican. He served McGregor as mayor and municipal judge. Between 1866 and 1868, Leffingwell held the District 46 seat in the Iowa House of Representatives.

Leffingwell fully retired in 1882 due to complications of physical injuries, and moved to New London, Connecticut in 1885. He died on April 3, 1900.
