= Albert Leffingwell (novelist) =

American writer (1895–1946)

Albert Fear Leffingwell (April 24, 1895 – 1946) was an American advertising executive and novelist. He wrote crime and mystery thrillers under his own name, as well as the pseudonyms "Dana Chambers" and "Giles Jackson".

== Biography ==
Leffingwell was born April 24, 1895, in Cambridge, Massachusetts, the first son of Dr. Albert Tracy Leffingwell, and Dr. Elizabeth Fear. He had two brothers: Thomas Arthur Leffingwell former Mayor of Aurora, New York and Dr. Dana Jackson Leffingwell, Associate Professor of Zoology at the State College of Washington.

Albert Leffingwell graduated from Harvard University in 1916. While still at Harvard, he wrote a book of poetry, Castles in Spain, and had two poems published in the Harvard publication, Made to Order.

Leffingwell served in World War I in France as a member of the Intelligence Department, 108th Infantry Regiment, 27th Division, under the command of General John F. O'Ryan.

Leffingwell was married to Helen Lillian Urie; the couple had two daughters, Elisabeth and Joan Jackson.

Following his return from the war, Leffingwell began his career in advertising. He co-founded the advertising agencies Riegel & Leffingwell and Olmstead, Perrin, & Leffingwell in New York City. In 1929, his firm was absorbed by McCann.

In 1928, Leffingwell wrote Toujours de l'avant, about the Pineaud perfumery in France. This book was illustrated with water colors by Will Hollingsworth. In 1930, Leffingwell wrote a short monograph in memory of his younger brother, Dana, that was also illustrated by Hollingsworth.

Between 1939 and 1946, Leffingwell wrote 13 crime and mystery thrillers under his own name, as well as under his pseudonyms. His first novel, Some Day I'll Kill You, introduced the radio ad man turned hard-boiled detective, Jim Steele, who would re-appear in a number of subsequent novels. Steele was referenced several times by the Holden Caulfield character in the novel Catcher in the Rye (Ch. 10, "I told them my name was Jim Steele, just for the hell of it.").

Leffingwell died in 1946 in New Haven, Connecticut.

== Bibliography ==
- Castles in Spain (Privately printed, 1916)
- Dana Jackson Leffingwell (Privately printed, 1925)
- Toujours de l'avant (Paris; New York : Pinaud, c1928.)

"The facts presented in this book were specially gathered in Paris during the spring of 1928 by the author, Albert Leffingwell. The illustrations are the work of Will Hollingsworth. The book was printed as a limited edition of 1500 copies by the Smithsonian process, at the printing house of William Edwin Rudge, inc."

- Some Day I'll Kill You (New York : Dial Press, 1939.)
- Too Like the Lightning (New York : Dial Press, 1939.)
- She'll Be Dead by Morning (New York, The Dial press, 1940.)
- The Blonde Died First (New York, The Dial press, 1941.)
- Nine Against New York. New York: Henry Holt and Company (1941)
- Witch's Moon (New York, The Dial press, 1941.)
- The Frightened Man (New York, The Dial press, 1942.)
- The Court of Shadows (New York, The Dial press [1943])
- The Last Secret (New York : Dial Press, 1943.)
- Darling, This is Death (New York, Dial press, 1945.)
- Death Against Venus (New York, Dial press, 1946.)
- The Case of Caroline Animus (New York, The Dial press. [1946])
- Rope For An Ape (New York, N.Y., The Dial press, 1947.).
