= Albert Leffingwell (physician) =

American physician

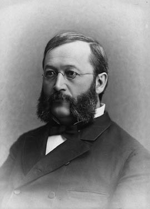
- Born: February 13, 1845; Aurora, Cayuga County, New York, United States
- Died: September 1, 1916 (aged 71); Aurora, Cayuga County, New York, United States
- Occupations: Physician, social and vivisection reformer
- Spouse: Elizabeth Fear (m. 1892)
- Children: Albert Fear Leffingwell

Albert Tracy Leffingwell (February 13, 1845 – September 1, 1916) was an American physician, social reformer, and vocal advocate for vivisection reform.

== Work ==
Leffingwell authored many books bringing light to the cruel abuses of animal experimentation and calling for regulation. At the same time, he sought middle ground between the anti-vivisection societies, which called for the abolition of all experimentation and those who rejected any restraints. Leffingwell also was concerned with meat safety, believing that lax regulations, in particular allowing cancerous animals into the food chain, were responsible for increases in the incidence of cancer. He also served as the president of the American Humane Association.

He founded the American Society for the Regulation of Vivisection which advocated regulation of vivisection subjected to surveillance, not full prohibition.

From 1895 to 1906, Leffingwell corresponded with Sarah James Eddy on the topic of animal welfare and vivisection.

== Selected publications ==
- Rambles Through Japan Without a Guide. London, 1892.
- Illegitimacy and the Influence of Seasons upon Conduct. London and New York, 1893.
- A Dangerous Ideal, 1894.
- Vivisection in America. New York, 1895.
- Does Science Need Secrecy?. Providence, 1896.
- Physiology in our Public Schools. Boston, 1900.
- The Vivisection Question. New York, 1901.
- Illustration of Human Vivisection, 1907 (pamphlet).
- The Morality of London. London, 1908.
- The Vivisection Controversy. London, 1908.
- American Meat. London and New York, 1910.
- An Ethical Problem. London and New York, 1916
