= Saco-Lowell Shops =

Textile machine manufacturer

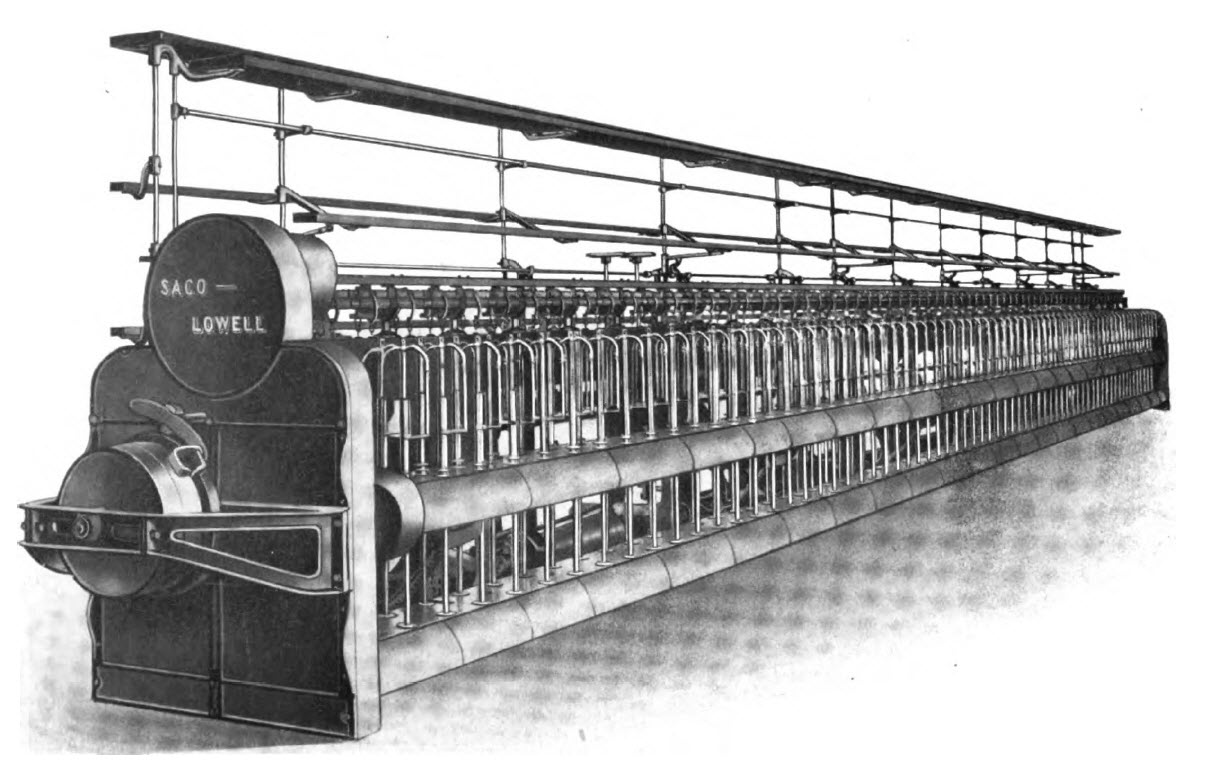
A Saco-Lowell roving frame, ca. 1920

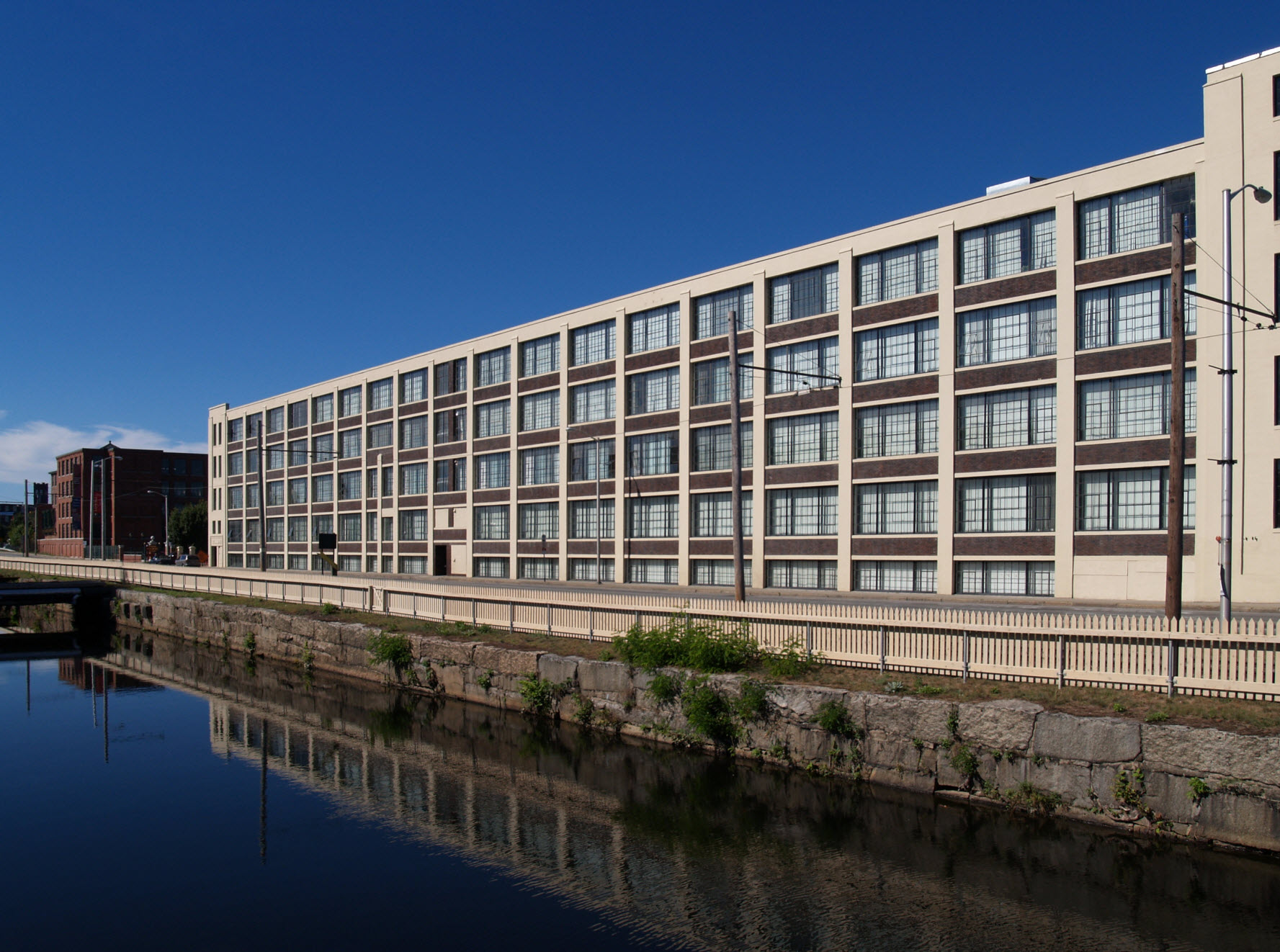
Saco-Lowell Building 15, Lowell. The Kitson Machine Works building is on the left in the distance.

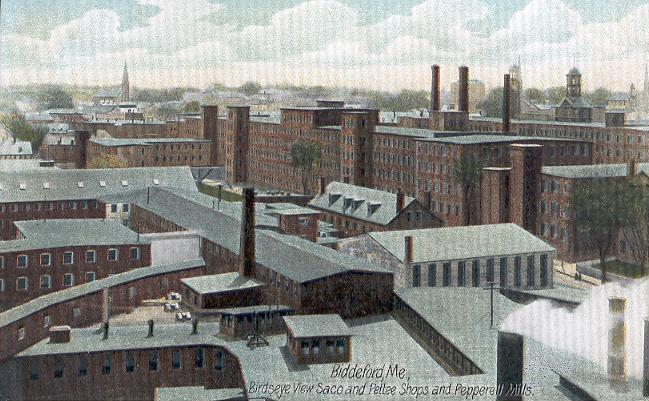
Biddeford, Maine plant, 1906 (foreground)

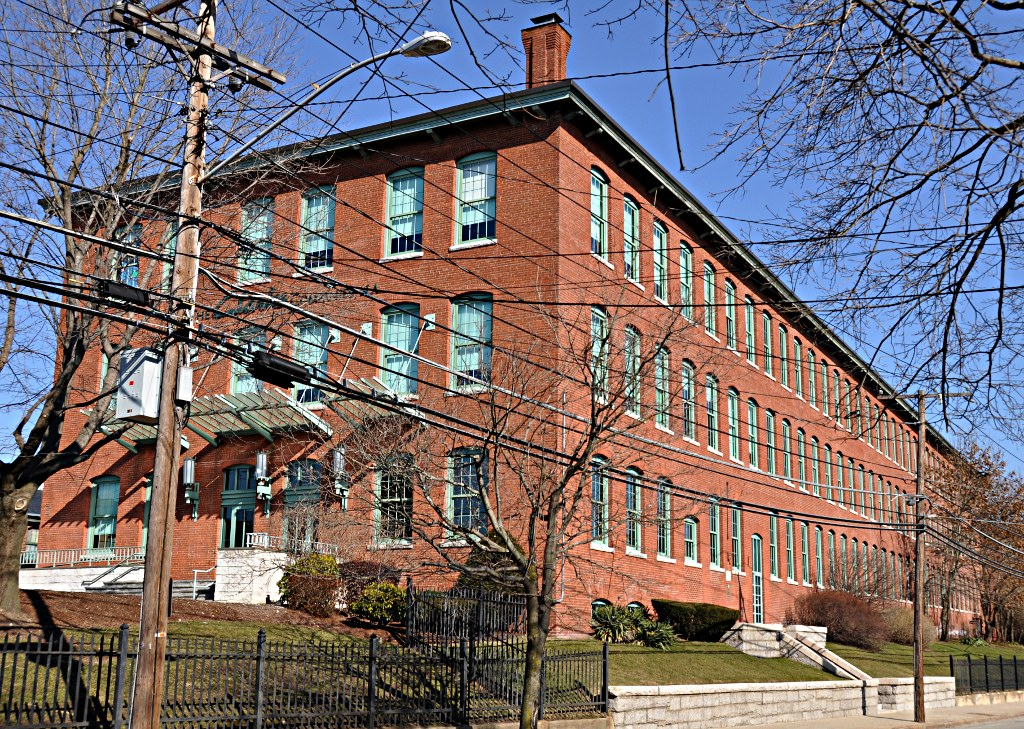
Newton Upper Falls plant

The Saco-Lowell Shops (later Saco-Lowell Corporation) was once one of the largest textile machine manufacturers in the United States. It was formed in 1912 with a merger between the Lowell Machine Shop with the Saco-Pettee Machine Company. At its peak in the 1920s, the company had manufacturing facilities in Lowell and Newton, Massachusetts, and Biddeford, Maine. The company maintained their executive office at 77 Franklin Street in Boston, and also had a southern office in Charlotte, North Carolina.

During the mid-20th century, Saco-Lowell was one of the "big three" cotton textile machinery builders in New England, along with the Whitin Machine Works and the Draper Corporation. While cotton machinery was the company's mainstay, Saco-Lowell also made machinery for the woolen and silk industries.

== Company origins ==
=== Lowell Machine Shop ===
The Lowell Machine Shop had its origins in the early days of the textile industry in the United States when it was set up as part of the Merrimack Manufacturing Company in 1824, the first cotton textile mill established in Lowell. Under the direction of Paul Moody, the shop also built machinery for the other mills in Lowell as they were set up. Including the Boott Mills in 1835 and others. The company soon gained a reputation for producing high-quality cotton machinery. The Lowell Machine Shop was located at the junction of the Merrimack and Pawtucket Canals, near the Swamp Locks, across from Dutton Street in Lowell.

In 1834, the Lowell Machine Shop also began producing steam locomotives for the newly created Boston and Lowell Railroad.

The Lowell Machine Shop was incorporated in 1845 in Lowell, Massachusetts as a separate company. The company produced most of the machines for other cotton mills in Lowell during this period.

=== Saco Water Power Company ===
The Saco Water Power Company first established a machine shop in 1841 on the banks of the Saco River in Biddeford, Maine.

A new manufacturing plant was opened in Biddeford in 1900.

=== Pettee Machine Works ===
Otis Pettee established a textile manufacturing company in 1831 at Newton Upper Falls, Massachusetts. The company was reorganized in 1882 by Henry Billings as the Pettee Machine Works. During the 1890s, the company expanded its Newton facilities.

Saco and Pettee merged in 1897 and became known as the Saco & Pettee Machine Shops.

=== Kitson Machine Shop ===
The Kitson Machine Shop was founded by Richard Kitson in Lowell in 1849. It became well known for its cotton preparatory machines, especially its picker machine. Kitson was acquired by the Lowell Machine Shop in 1905. The Kitson plant in Lowell was closed in 1928, when all of the company's operations were consolidated in Biddeford.

== Merger and consolidation ==
The Saco & Pettee Machine Shops merged with the Lowell Machine Shops in 1912.

In 1923, Saco-Lowell expanded in Lowell with the completion of Building #15 on Dutton Street. However, just five years later in 1928, this factory was closed, along with all other Lowell plants. Operations were consolidated in Biddeford.

The plant in Newton Upper Falls was closed in 1932. Much of the Lowell plant was demolished that same year.

== Recent history ==
In 1992, the former Kitson factory on Dutton Street in Lowell was acquired by the American Textile History Museum, which moved to the site in 1994. The building was recently renovated and portions have been converted into residences and offices.

Building #15 in Lowell, next door to the Kitson building served a variety of manufacturing and retail uses until 2003 when it was converted into apartments.

Saco-Lowell operated a manufacturing plant in Easley, South Carolina. It closed in November, 2000.

The remnants of the company, known as Saco-Lowell Parts is now part of W.W. Williams of Akron, Ohio.

== See also ==
- Saco-Lowell Shops Housing Historic District
- Saco-Pettee Machine Shops - Historic factory site in Newton Upper Falls, Massachusetts
- Platt Brothers

== Archives and records ==
- Saco & Lowell Company records at Baker Library Special Collections, Harvard Business School.
