= Upper Charles River Reservation =

State park in Massachusetts, U.S.

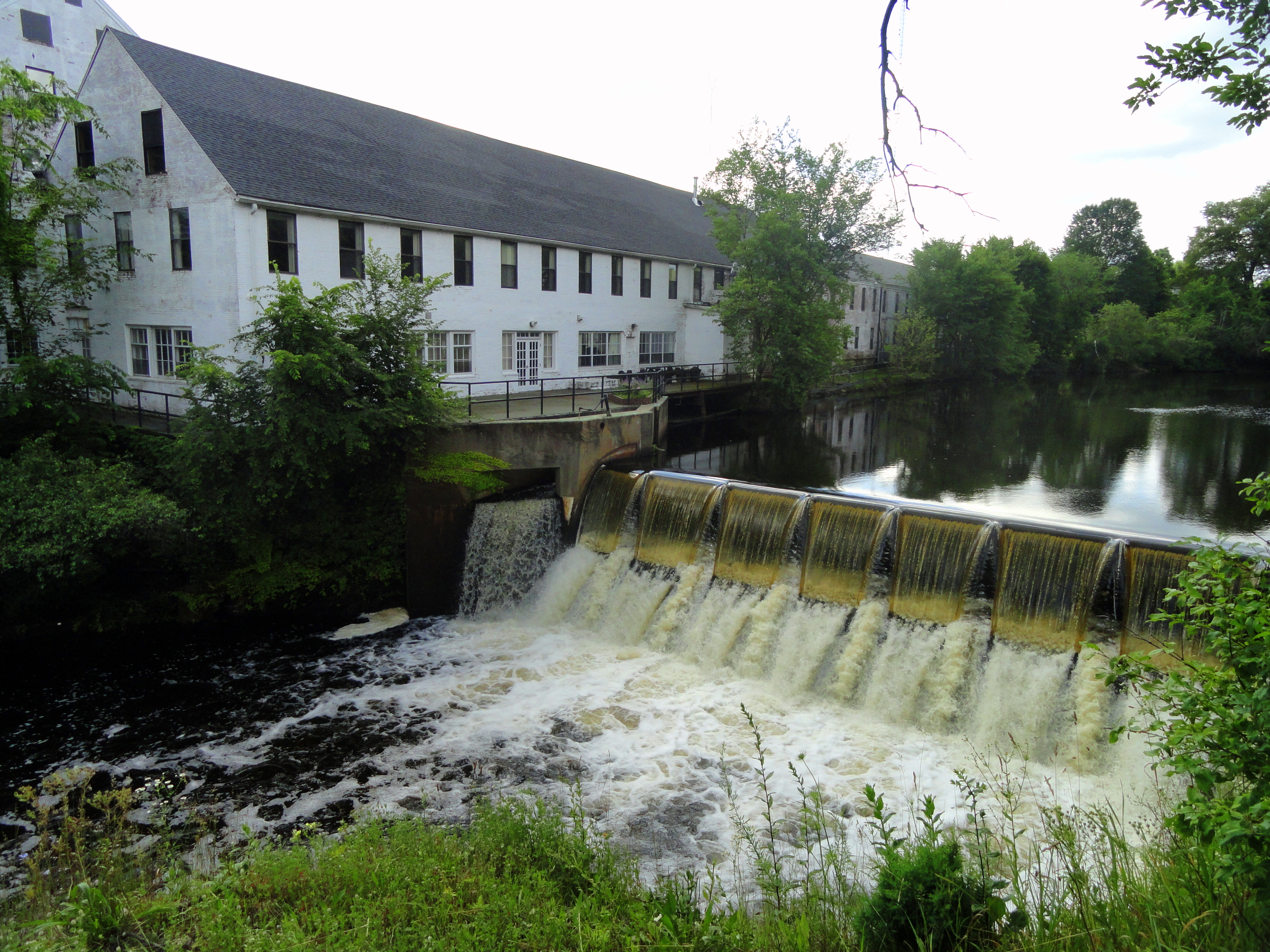
- The Silk Mill Dam in Hemlock Gorge

- Location within Massachusetts Location within the United States
- Location: Watertown, Newton, Waltham, Weston, Wellesley, Needham, West Roxbury, and Dedham, Massachusetts, United States
- Coordinates: 42°21′31″N 71°14′14″W
- Established: 1890s
- Administrator: Massachusetts Department of Conservation and Recreation
- Website: Official website

The Upper Charles River Reservation is a Massachusetts state park encompassing portions of the banks of the Charles River between the Watertown Dam in Watertown and Riverdale Park in Dedham and the West Roxbury neighborhood of Boston. The park is managed by the Massachusetts Department of Conservation and Recreation. It includes land in the communities of Watertown, Waltham, Newton, Weston, Wellesley, Needham, Dedham, and Boston. Some of the Charles River Reservation Parkways also fall within the park boundaries. The Charles River Bike Path follows the river through much of the reservation.

== Parks and attractions ==
The following parks and other attractions are along the river between Watertown and Dedham:

- Charles River Museum of Industry & Innovation
- Mount Feake Cemetery
- Auburndale Park and Flowed Meadow
- Norumbega Park
- Weston Ski Track
- Hemlock Gorge Reservation, including Echo Bridge
- Nahanton Park
- Cutler Park
- Brook Farm
- Millennium Park
- Riverdale Park

== See also ==
- Charles River Reservation
