= Johnson String Instrument =

American musical instrument retailer

- Company type: Private
- Industry: Musical Instruments
- Founded: 1976
- Headquarters: Newton Upper Falls, Massachusetts
- Products: Violins, Cellos, Violas, Double Basses, Musical Accessories
- Owner: Adam Johnson
- Website: JohnsonString.com

Johnson String Instrument is a full service provider of new and previously owned stringed instruments and accessories, including their rental, sales, restoration, repair and appraisal. Located in Newton Upper Falls, Massachusetts, the company was founded in 1976 by Carol and Roger Johnson, and is currently owned by their son, Adam Johnson. The company is privately held.

== History ==
=== Early years ===
Roger Johnson and his wife Carol opened Johnson String Instrument in 1976 as a business that primarily offered instrument repair, appraisal and sales. Two years later the Johnsons entered the rental market.

All rental instruments are hand-selected in China, then refined in the Johnson String Instrument workshop. An unusual practice when the Johnsons implemented it, the business model is more widely used today, as Chinese-made instruments and bows have gained acceptance.

In 2008, Carol and Roger Johnson turned over operation of Johnson String to their son, Adam, who had been working with the company since 1990. Roger Johnson died in November 2021.

=== Carriage House Violins ===
In November 2013, Johnson String Instrument acquired Carriage House Violins. Founded by Christopher Reuning of Reuning & Son Violins, Carriage House is known for its high-end modern and antique violins, violas and cellos. The location houses a 50-seat rehearsal hall and the company’s sales staff is composed entirely of professionally trained musicians.

Carriage House developed and staged the first annual Cello Month, held in 2015. The event included lectures, exhibits and performances, and helped forge the creation of the Boston Cello Society.

== Community Involvement ==
Johnson String Instrument has been donating or lending instruments to students in need since the early 2000s.

=== Johnson String Project (JSP) ===
In 2015, Carol Johnson partnered with the Massachusetts Cultural Council to support a local musical program called SerHacer. Based on Venezuela’s successful program, El Sistema, SerHacer works to increase access to musical instruments, instruction and performance opportunities for children living in poverty. The intent of the program is to increase confidence, build a sense of community, and offer youth a safe place to stay for a few hours a day, in addition to developing musical skills. Students take lessons from qualified teachers 5 days a week.

Johnson established the non-profit foundation, Johnson Strings Project, for the purpose of providing high quality instruments to under-served children through SerHacer, MusiConnects, and other organizations. In its first year, the organization supplied 300 instruments.

== Products ==
- Basses
- Cellos
- Guitars
- Mandolins
- Ukuleles
- Violas
- Violins
- Accessories: Bows, cases, strings, sheet music, books
