= Charles River Reservation Parkways =

Roads in Greater Boston, Massachusetts

- U.S. National Register of Historic Places
- U.S. Historic district
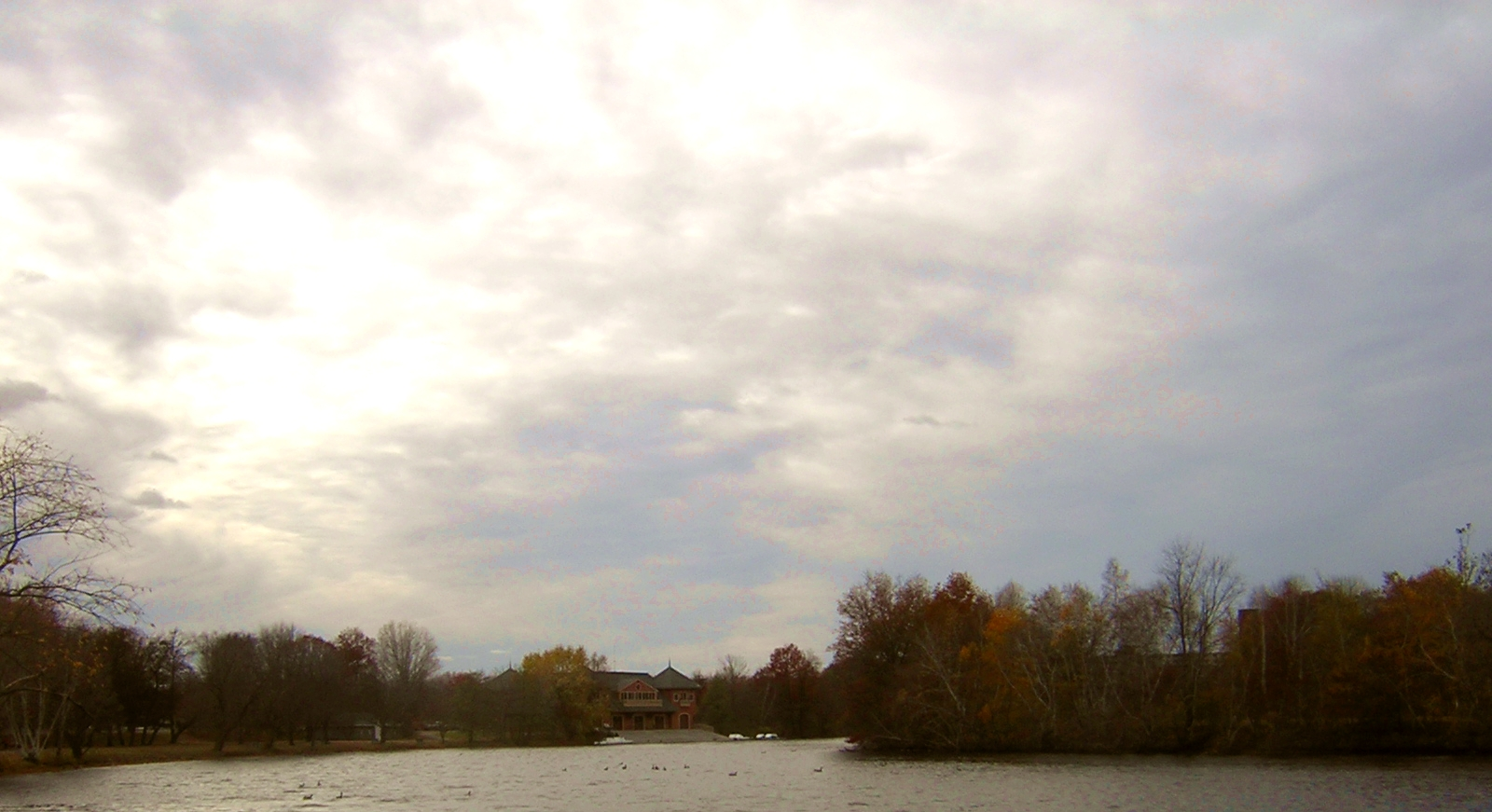
- View along the Charles showing the Henderson Boathouse: Soldiers Field Road to the left, Greenough Boulevard to the right

- Location within Massachusetts Location within the United States
- Location: Boston, Newton, Watertown, and Weston, Massachusetts
- Coordinates: 42°21′31.7″N 71°9′40.9″W
- Area: 65 acres (26 ha)
- Built: 1895
- Architect: Charles Eliot; Olmsted Brothers
- MPS: Metropolitan Park System of Greater Boston MPS
- NRHP reference No.: 05001530
- Added to NRHP: January 18, 2006

The Charles River Reservation Parkways are parkways that run along either side of the Charles River in eastern Massachusetts. The roads are contained within the Charles River Reservation and the Upper Charles River Reservation, and fall within a number of communities in the greater Boston metropolitan area. The Charles River parks extend from the Charles River Dam, where the Charles empties into Boston Harbor, to Riverdale Park in the West Roxbury neighborhood of Boston. Most of the roadways within the parks are listed on the National Register of Historic Places as a unit, although Storrow Drive and Memorial Drive are listed as part of the Charles River Basin Historic District.

The other roadways, listed in 2006, extend from Harvard Square to Newton Upper Falls. The roads on the river banks were improved at the beginning of the 20th century to provide a continuous route through the park.

== Eastern parkways ==
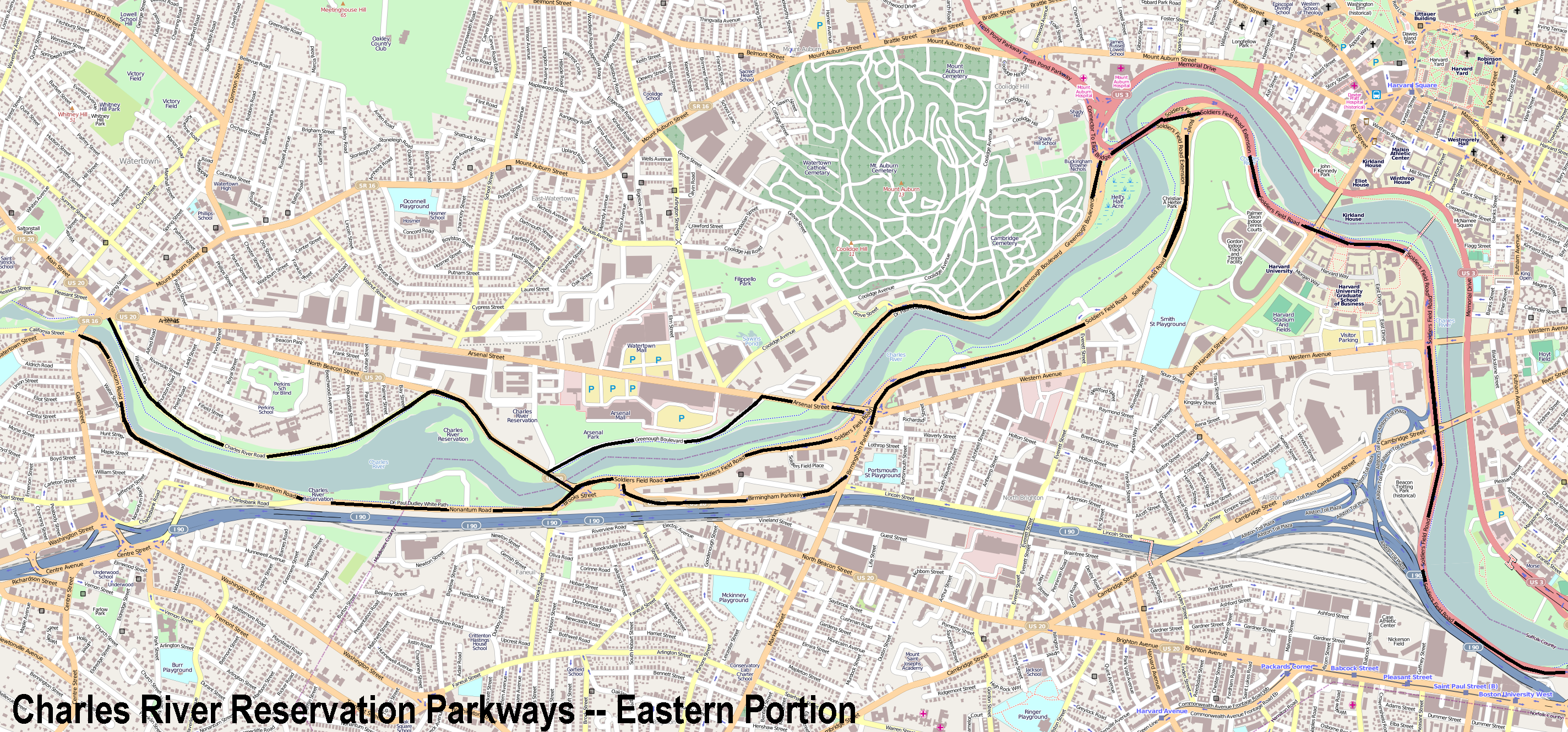
Eastern parkways

The eastern parkways are within the Charles River Reservation, extending from Harvard Square to the vicinity of Watertown Square in Watertown and Newton.

- Western Avenue/Arsenal Street, a short stretch between Soldiers Field Rd and Greenough Blvd, including a bridge across the river
- Charles River Road, on the north bank in Watertown
- Greenough Boulevard, the north bank from the end of Memorial Drive in Cambridge to Arsenal Street in Watertown
- Leo Birmingham Parkway, a short stretch farther from the river on the south bank, joining Soldiers Field Road at each end. This was created in 1936 as the original routing of Soldiers Field Road around the river-facing Brighton Abbatoir. The slaughterhouse closed in the 1940s and Soldiers Field Road was routed directly along the shoreline. The 2021 DCR Parkways Master Plan recommended this redundant road (all the buildings on it are served by other roads, and the Massachusetts Turnpike was later constructed immediately to the south) be considered for conversion to parkland, but in 2024 was scheduled for reconstruction as a narrower roadway with parallel mixed-use path.
- Nonantum Road, on the south bank from the end of Soldiers Field Road into Newton
- North Beacon Street, a short stretch connecting Greenough Blvd with Charles River Road
- Soldiers Field Road, from the end of Storrow Drive through Allston and Brighton to the North Beacon Street Bridge, where it meets Nonantum Road

== Western parkways ==
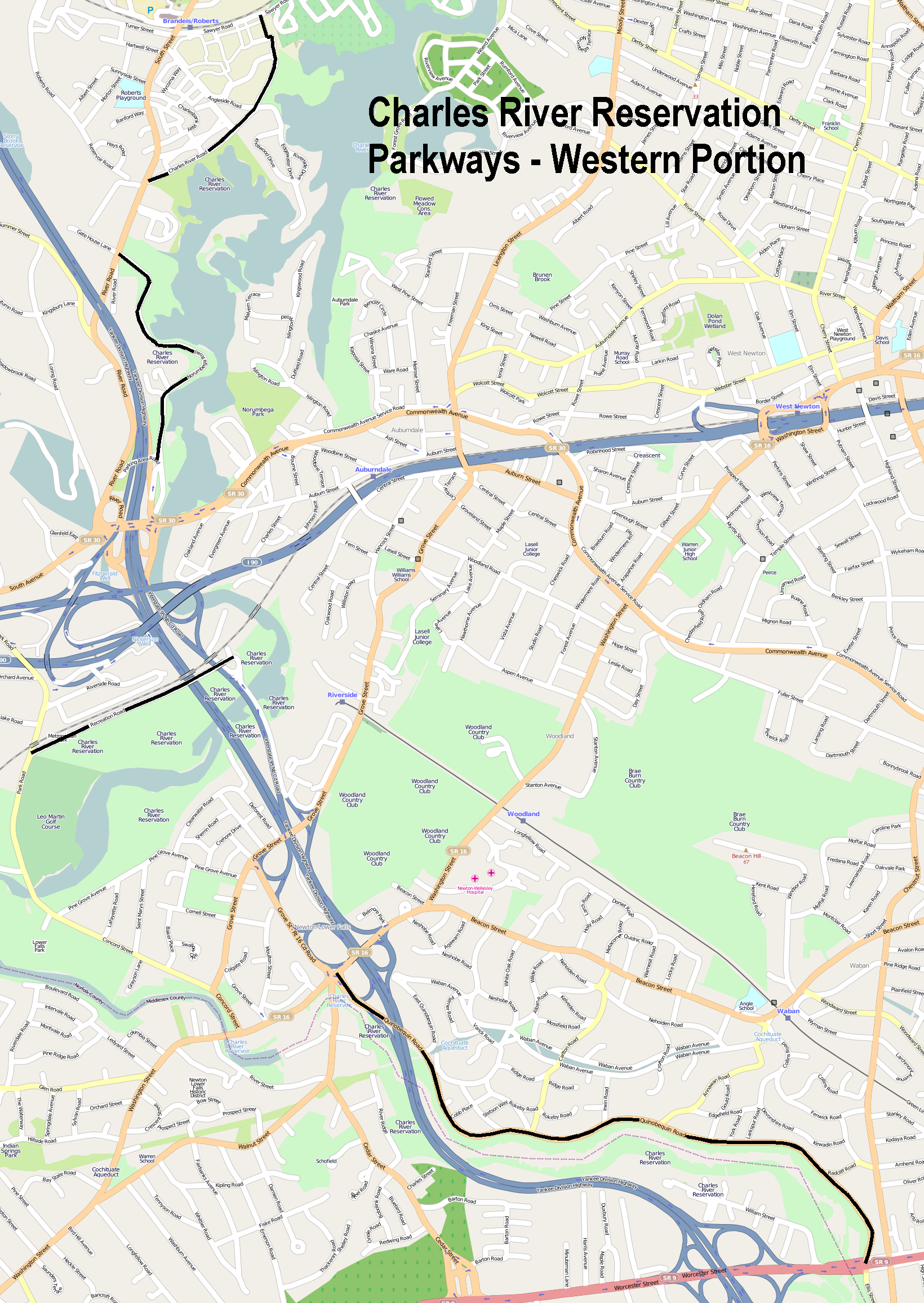
Western parkways

The western parkways are within the Upper Charles River Reservation. They comprise several discontiguous segments in Waltham, Weston, and Newton. The stretch of the Charles they abut are between Sawyer Road in Waltham and Route 9 near its interchange with I-95.

- Norumbega Road, between South Street and Route 30 in Waltham
- Quinobequin Road, between Route 16 and Route 9 in Newton
- Recreation Road, between I-95 and Park Street in Weston

== History ==
The Charles River parkways were laid out in concept in a plan developed by landscape architect Charles Eliot for the Metropolitan Parks Commission (MPC, predecessor to the Metropolitan District Commission (MDC), now the Massachusetts Department of Conservation and Recreation, or DCR). Land acquisition for the parks lining the Charles began in 1895, with park and parkway construction beginning soon afterward. The western portion of Soldiers Field Road was one of the first to be built, as part of the Charles River Speedway, an early racing oval, between 1899 and 1910. Other roads completed by 1910 include the listed portions of North Beacon Street, Greenough Boulevard, and Charles River Road. Nonantum Road was built between 1910 and 1931. Leo Birmingham Boulevard was completed in 1936, as a bypass around a slaughterhouse on the river that the MDC had been unable to acquire. It was eventually taken in the 1940s, allowing for the completion of Soldiers Field Road.

The master plan for the upper river was predicated on acquiring sufficient land for the building of continuous roadways, which was precluded by dense land use in portions of Watertown and Waltham. The oldest of the roads is Quinobequin Road, built in 1900. Recreation Road and Norumbega Road were both built in the 1930s. Recreation Road has since been impacted by the construction of both Interstate 95 and the Massachusetts Turnpike, which have cut off elements of the waterfront from land access.

== See also ==
- National Register of Historic Places listings in Cambridge, Massachusetts
- National Register of Historic Places listings in Middlesex County, Massachusetts
- National Register of Historic Places listings in Newton, Massachusetts
- National Register of Historic Places listings in Waltham, Massachusetts
- National Register of Historic Places listings in Weston, Massachusetts
- National Register of Historic Places listings in northern Boston, Massachusetts
