= Moses Forster Sweetser =

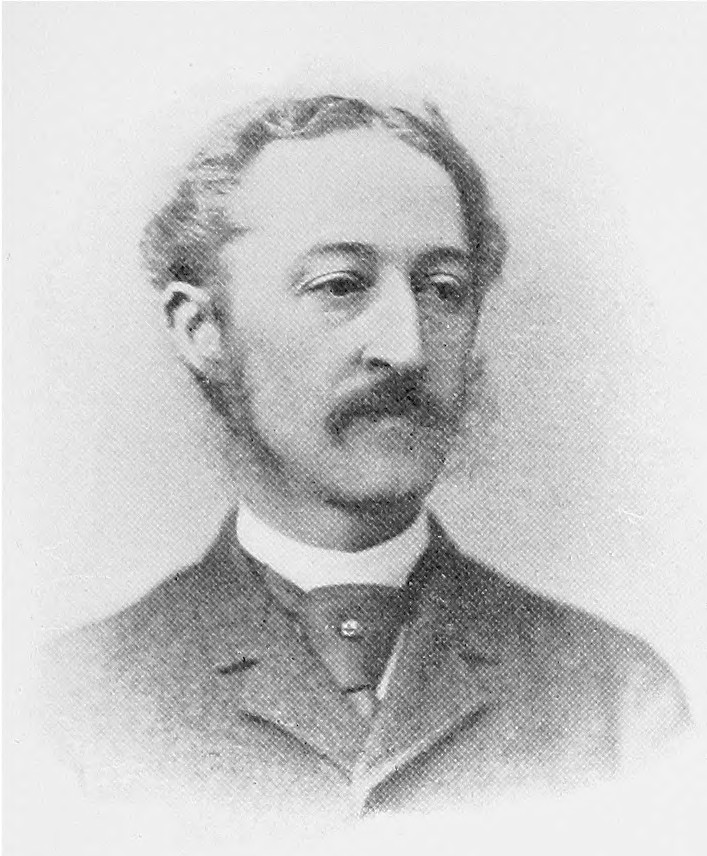
Portrait of Moses Forster Sweetser from A Bibliography of the White Mountains

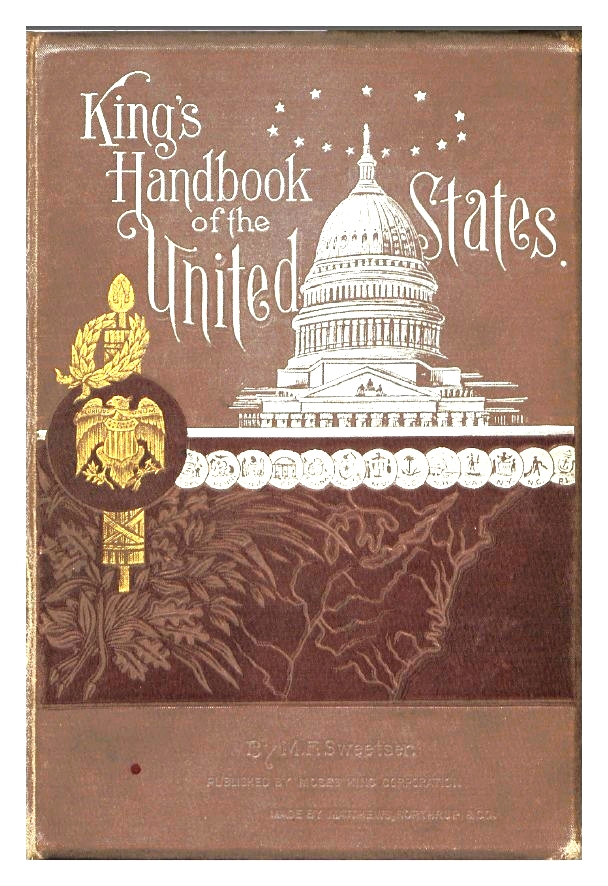
King's Handbook of the United States

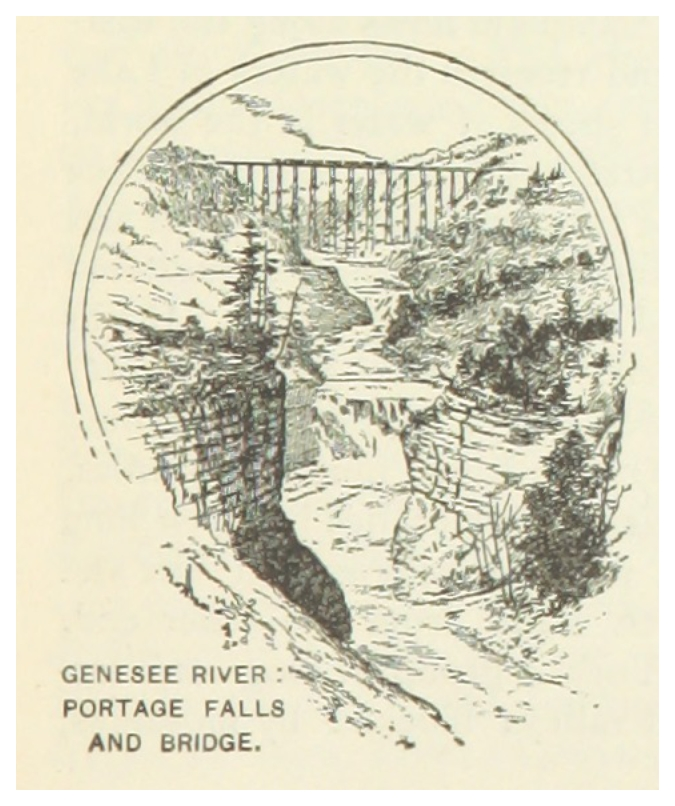
Etching of Portage Falls and Portage Bridge from Moses Forster Sweetser's King's Hand-book of the United States, 1891

Moses Forster Sweetser (September 23, 1848 - 1897) authored travel books on the White Mountains, Maine in 1880, Massachusetts (1889), and a handbook on the U.S. (1891). He also wrote several biographies on artists including Guido Reni, Raphael, Fra Angelico, Sir Joshua Reynolds, Leonardo da Vinci, Bartolomé Esteban Murillo, Washington Allston, Landseer, Claude Lorrain, and Dürer. He was affiliated with the Moses King Corporation.

Sweetser was born in Newburyport, Massachusetts. He toured Europe and climbed in the Alps on a two-year jaunt before returning stateside and writing travel guidebooks along the lines of the Karl Baedecker's series he relied on in Europe.

He published several books with Chisholm Brothers publishing company of Portland, Maine.

The Mount Washington Observatory Collection has an image of Sweetser. He helped encourage visitors to the White Mountains of New Hampshire with his guidebook; A Bibliography of the White Mountains

Moses King edited some of his books as well as Edwin M. Bacon's King's Dictionary of Boston.

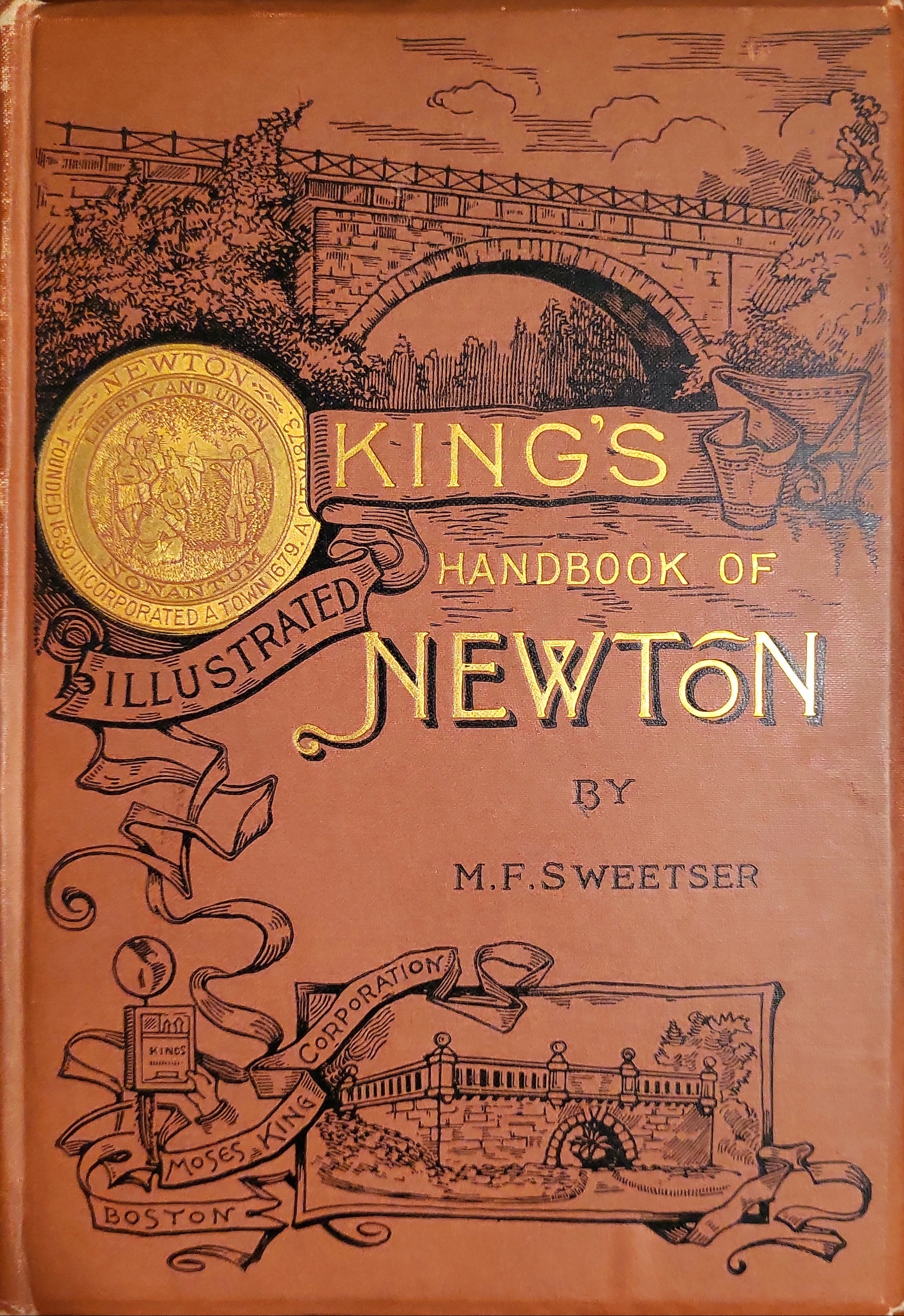
King's Handbook of Newton, 1889 The cover shows Echo Bridge and the John Eliot Memorial

== Works ==
- The Maritime Provinces: a handbook for travelers, a guide to chief cities, coasts and islands of the Maritime Provinces of Canada, and to their scenery and historic attractions, with the gulf and river of St. Lawrence to Quebec and Montreal, also Newfoundland and the Labrador coast, Boston : J.R. Osgood, (1875)
- White Mountains, a handbook for travelers (1876)
- Allston, Boston, Houghton, Osgood and Company (1879)
- Picturesque Maine (1880)
- Artist-biographies, several editions from at least 1878 until 1882
- Summer Days Down East (1883)
- King's Handbook of Newton (1889)
- King's Handbook of Boston Harbor (1889)
- King's Hand-book of the United States (1891)
- Chisholm's Mount-Desert guide-book, Chisholm Brothers (circa 1888)
- King's Handbook of Massachusetts (1889)
- Chisholm's White Mountain guide-book, Chisholm Bros.
- How to Know New York City, co-author
- Hints for home reading; a series of chapters on books and their use, G. P. Putnam's Sons, New York
- Pamphlet on the Boston and Maine Railroad
