= Echo Bridge =

- U.S. National Register of Historic Places
- U.S. Historic district – Contributing property
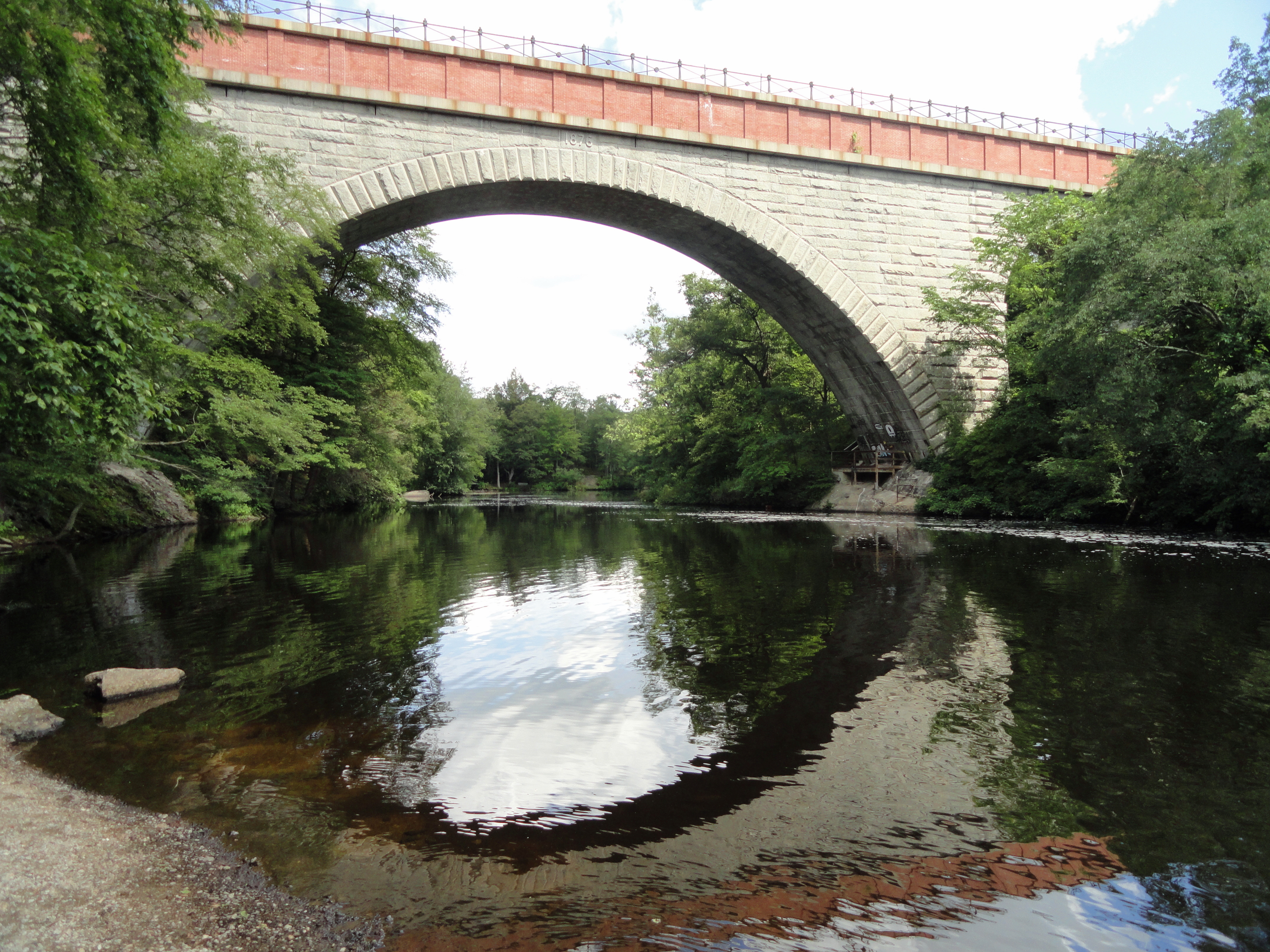
- Echo Bridge
- Location: Spans the Charles River between Needham and Newton, Massachusetts, U.S.
- Coordinates: 42°18′53.42″N 71°13′36.84″W
- Built: 1876
- Architect: George W. Phelps
- Part of: Sudbury Aqueduct Linear District (#89002293); Newton Upper Falls Historic District (#86001750)
- NRHP reference No.: 80000638

Significant dates
- Added to NRHP: April 9, 1980
- Designated CP: January 18, 1990; September 4, 1986

Echo Bridge is a historic masonry bridge spanning the Charles River between Needham to Newton Upper Falls, Massachusetts, and Ellis Street in Newton. The bridge carries the Sudbury Aqueduct and foot traffic, and is located in the Hemlock Gorge Reservation. At the time of its construction in 1876–1877, it was the second longest masonry arch in the country.

The bridge was listed on the National Register of Historic Places in 1980, and was named an American Water Landmark in 1981.

== Description ==
The bridge crosses over Hemlock Gorge where the Charles River passes over the fall line in Newton Upper Falls. There are still old mill buildings in view from the bridge, but most of the gorge remains naturally overgrown with hemlocks. The bridge has two viewing locations, the pedestrian walk on top of the bridge and a platform underneath where visitors can hear the eponymous echoes. Views include white water, a waterfall and the hemlock-lined gorge. The 23-acre (93,000 m^{2}) Hemlock Gorge Reservation including the gorge is maintained by the Massachusetts Department of Conservation and Recreation. The bridge is located just off Route 9 where it crosses Route 128. Despite being in the midst of a tangle of highways, the river itself is tree-lined and natural.

The bridge is 500 feet (150 m) long, and consists of a series of seven arches. The longest of these, that crosses the Charles, has a span of 137 feet (42 m), and is a segmented arch with a radius of 69 feet (21 m) and a crown of 51 feet (16 m). Five of the arches span 37 feet (11 m), while that spanning Ellis Street is 28 feet (8.5 m). At its crown the bridge is approximately 70 feet (21 m) above the river. The bridge's foundations are made of solid granite resting on bedrock.

In 1889, the cover of Moses King's King's Handbook of Newton, Massachusetts by Moses Forster Sweetser featured a wood cut engraving of the bridge on the cover as well as on the inside title page and a page which describes the bridge. It reads:

The crowning attraction of the village is the famous Echo Bridge, a marvellous stone aqueduct on which the Sudbury-River water is carried across the Charles River, high above the stream, on its way to the thirsty throats of Boston. There is a path leading down from Ellis Street, near the Baptist church, alongside the aqueduct, with an enrailed platform just under the arch large enough to accommodate a dozen persons.

The next description is of the echo that can be made from the enrailed platform below the bridge.

The favorite word to hurl at the arch is July, and the serious charge of lie — lie — lie is thrown back as vigorously and almost as frequently as if the bridge were a political newspaper in campaign time. The human voice, on a still day, is rapidly re-echoed 18 times from beneath this arch, and a pistol-shot gives 25 repetitions.

The bridge was closed to the public for much of 2006 to permit repairs of the railings, which were decaying and which do not meet modern safety codes. Because of the cost of rebuilding the historic railings, chain link fencing was installed on each side, allowing the bridge to be reopened. This fencing was later replaced by a set of modern railings inside the historic railings. Efforts are underway to secure funding to reconstruct the historic railings.

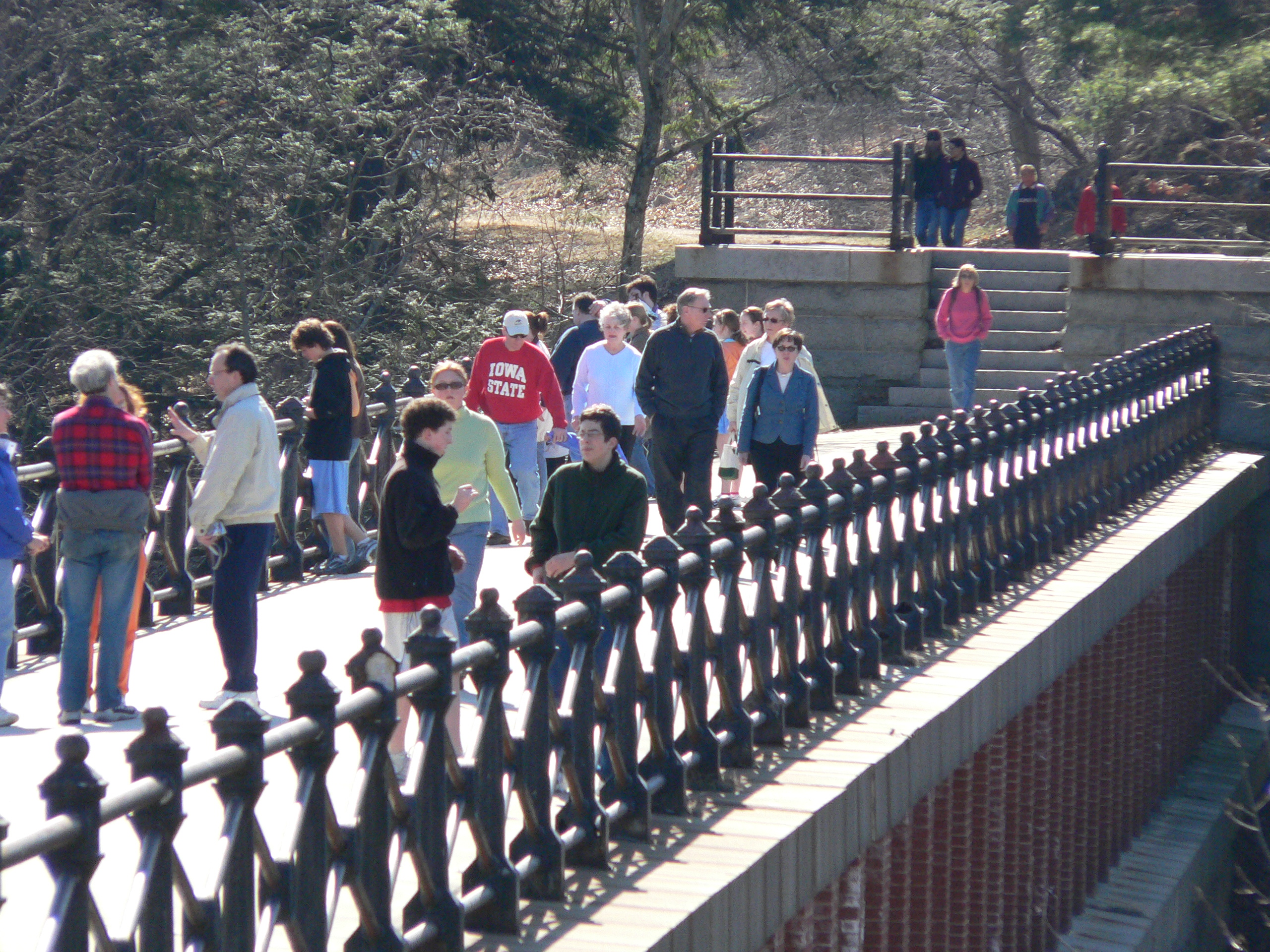
Walkers on the bridge before it was closed for railing repairs in 2006

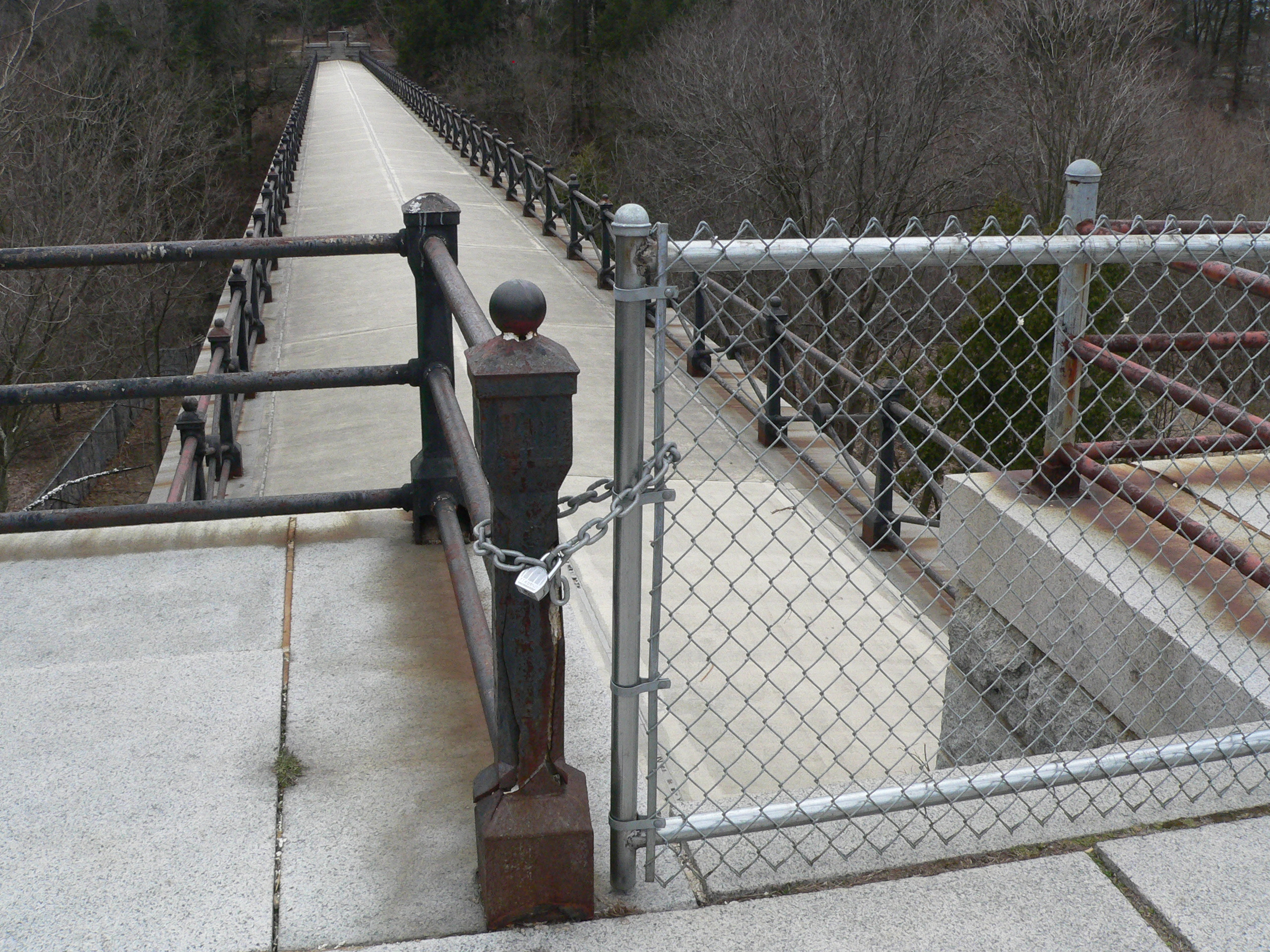
The bridge closed for repairs

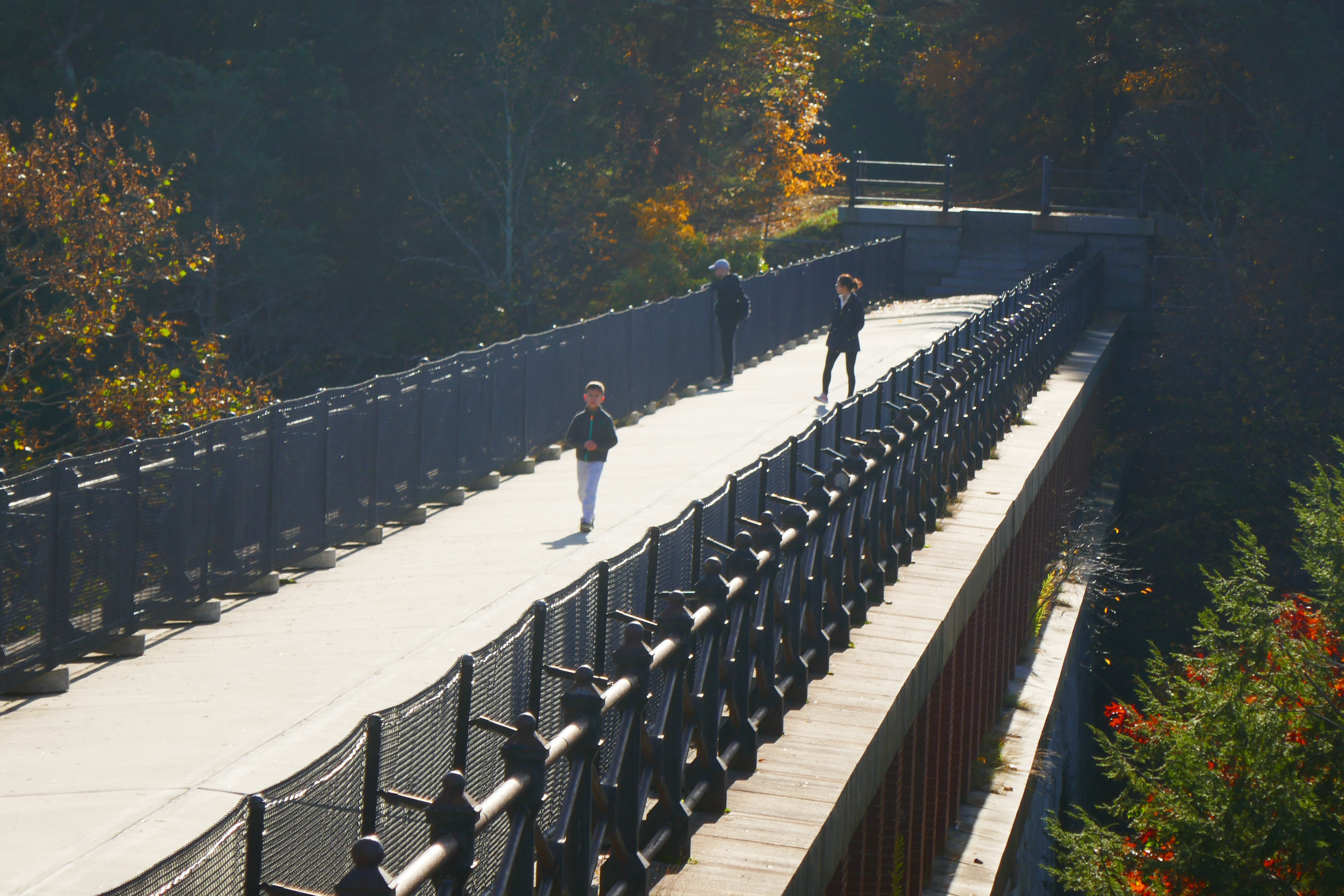
The bridge reopened with temporary protective fencing

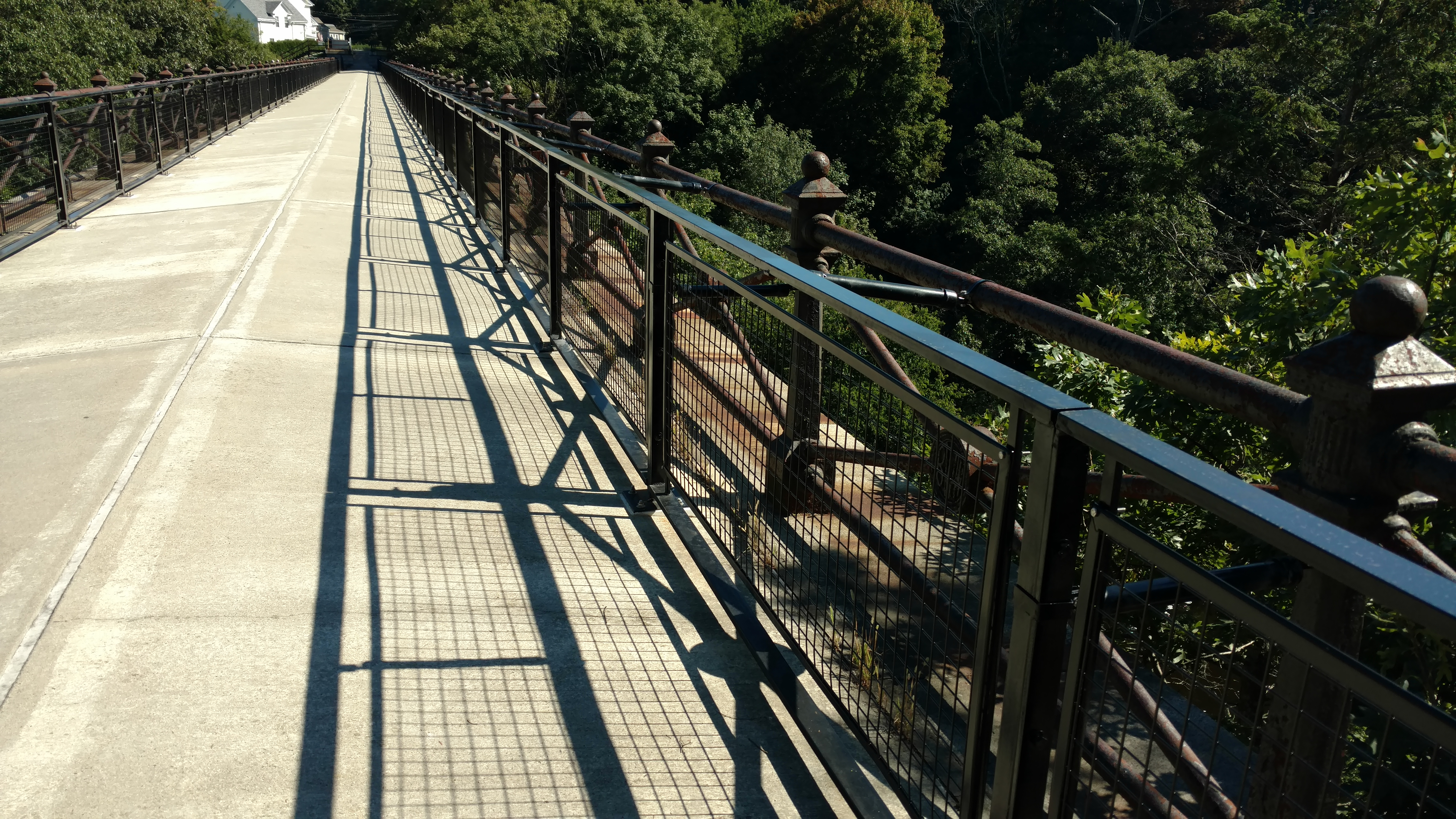
Protective railings next to the historic railings

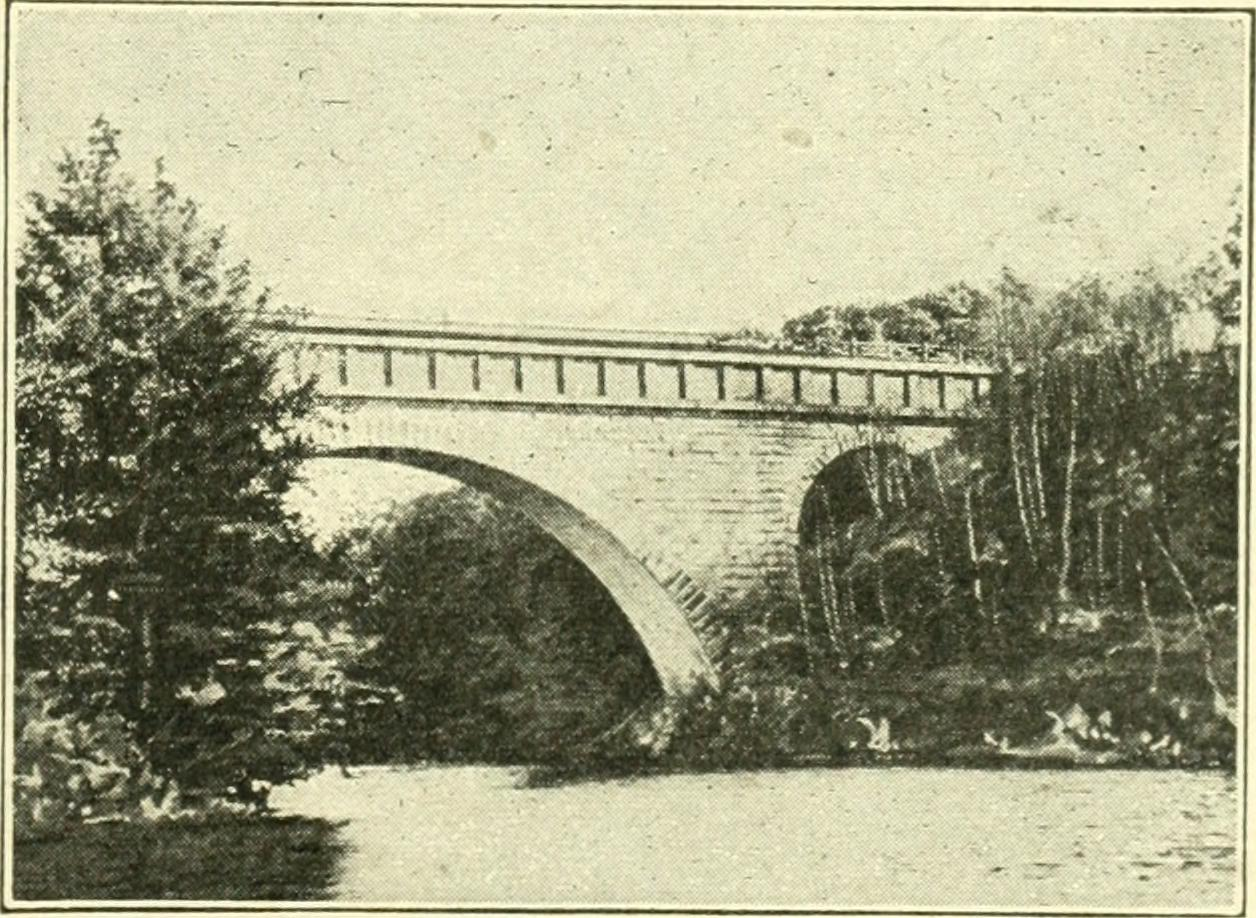
The bridge in 1900.

The aqueduct, which has been serving only as an emergency backup for some years, was reactivated during a state of emergency declared on May 1, 2010. The line was used to carry clean water to parts of 38 communities affected by a catastrophic failure elsewhere in the MWRA system.

== Photo gallery ==
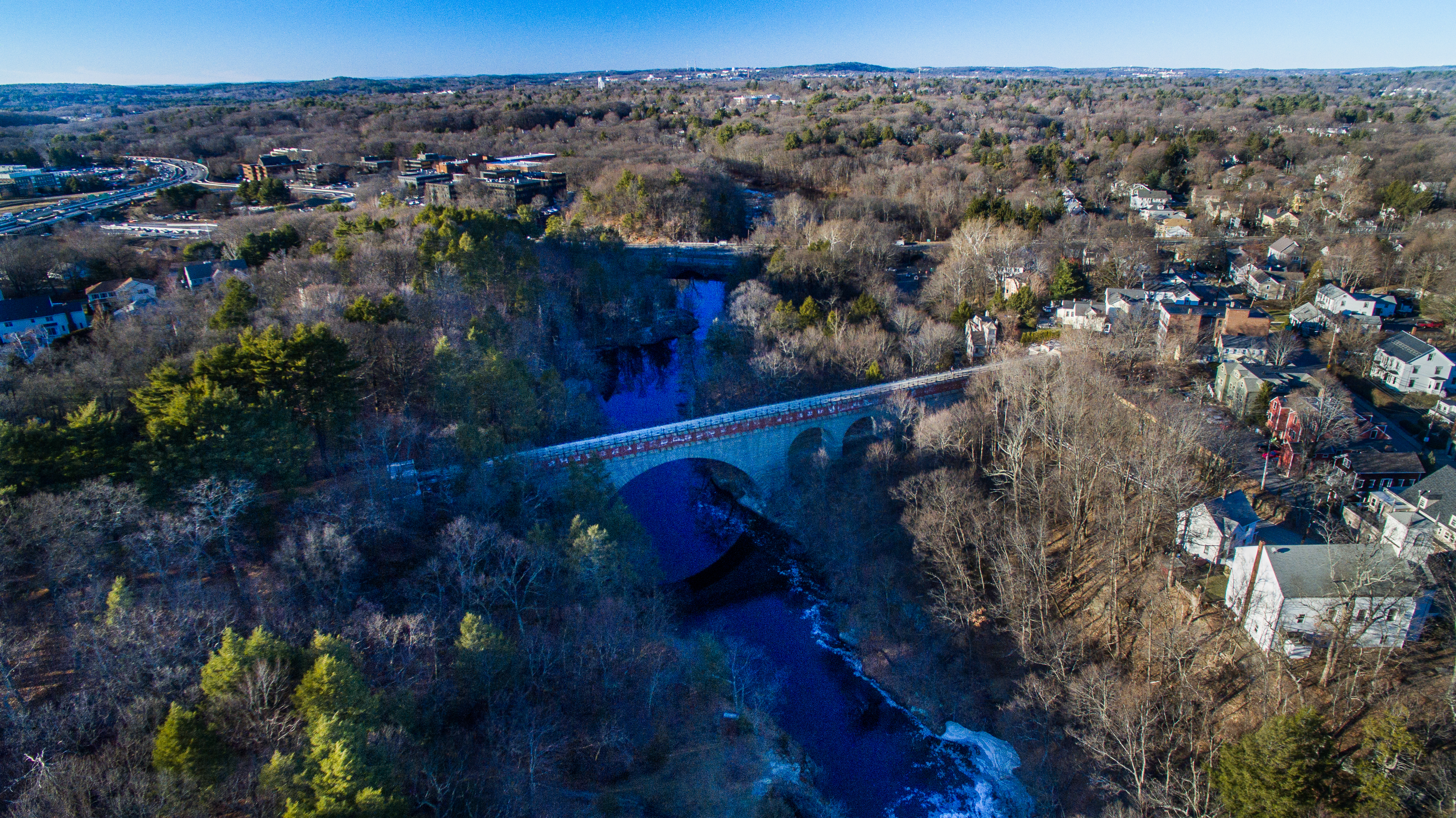
Aerial view of the bridge and Hemlock Gorge

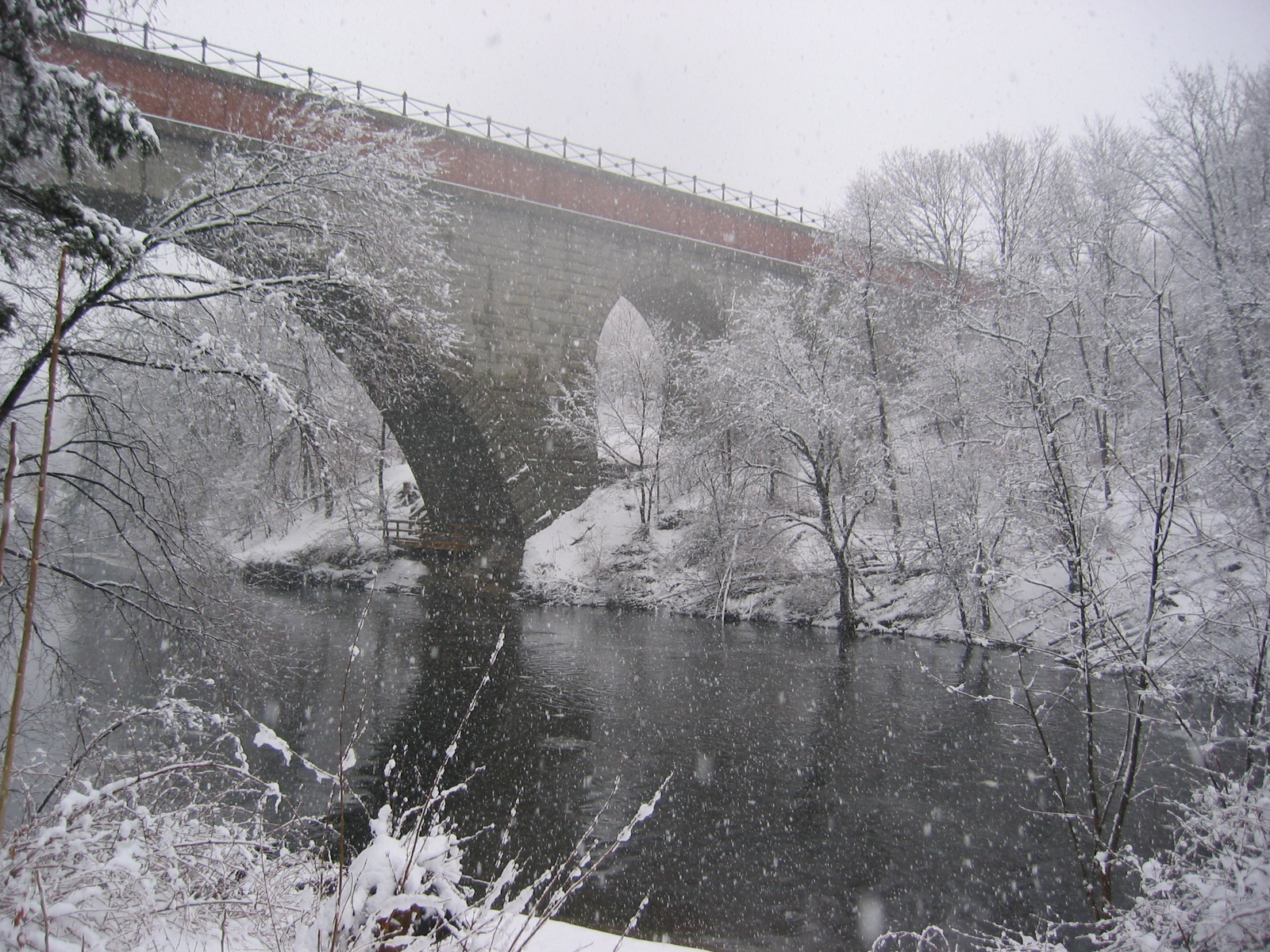
Winter view from upstream

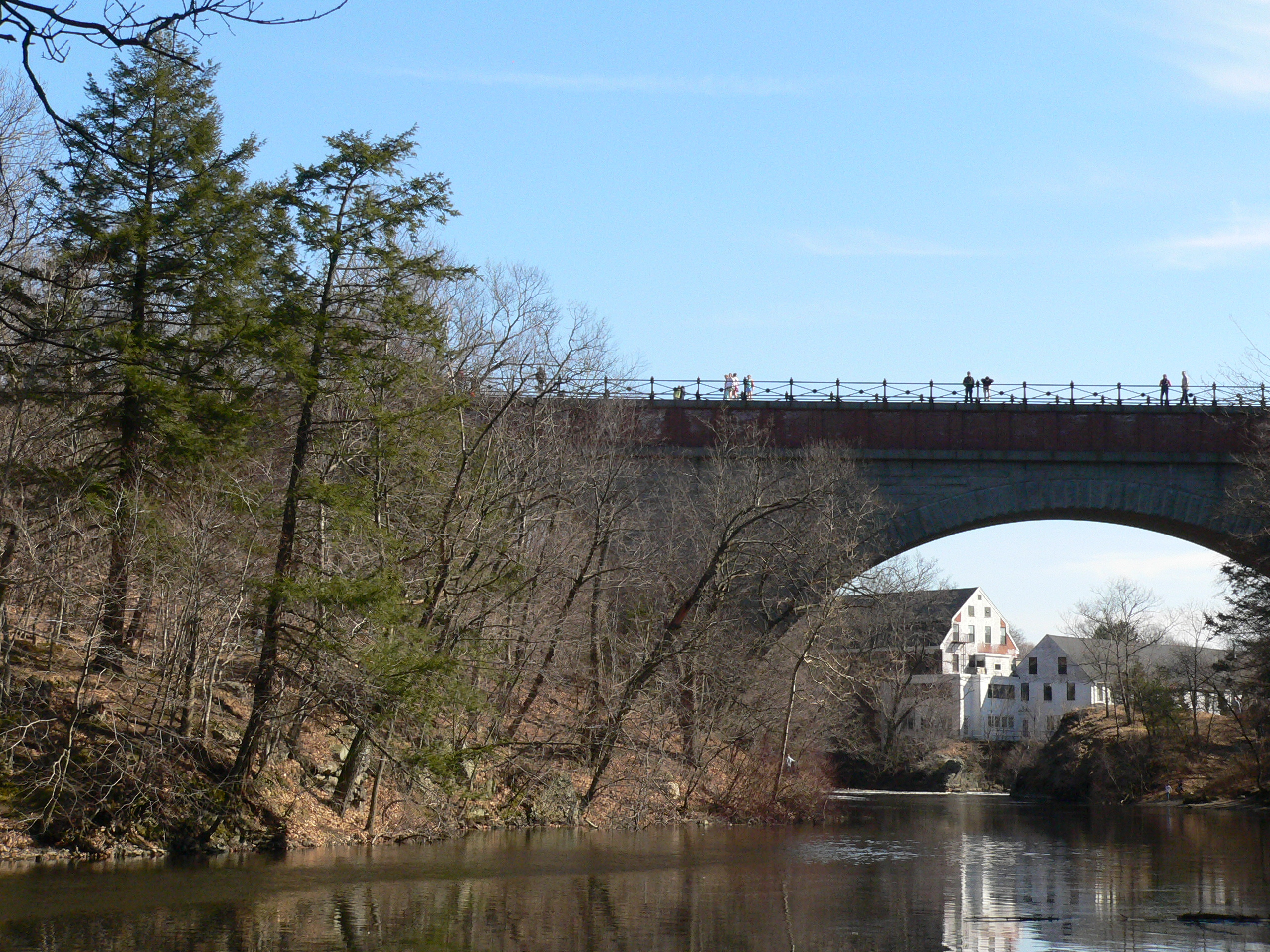
Spring view from downstream

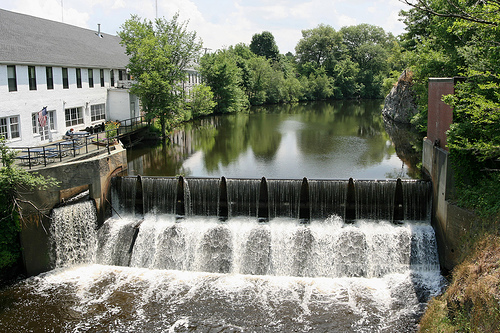
The Silk Mill Dam, viewed from Echo Bridge

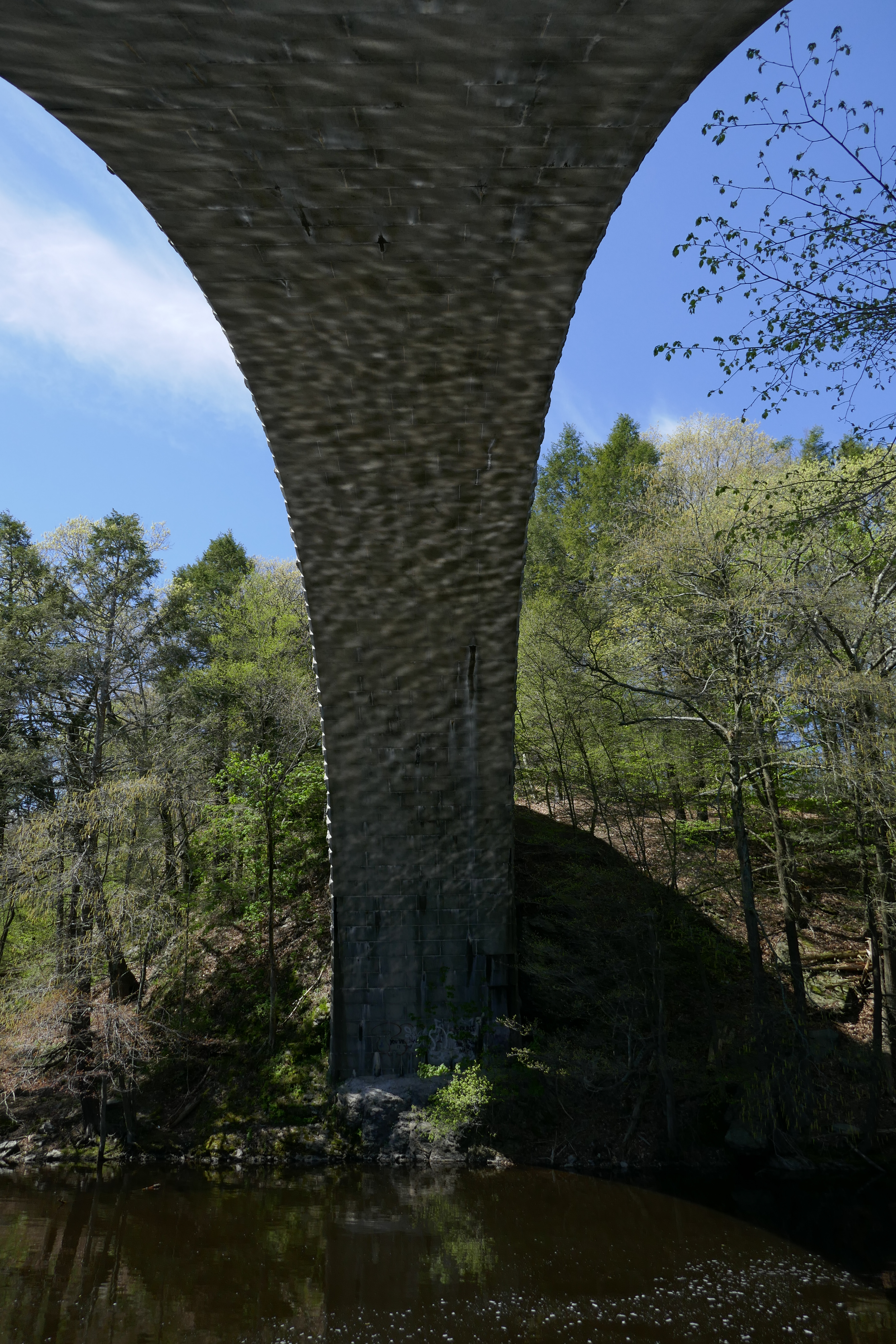
The bridge from the "echo platform" on the Newton side

== See also ==
- List of bridges documented by the Historic American Engineering Record in Massachusetts
- National Register of Historic Places listings in Newton, Massachusetts
- National Register of Historic Places listings in Norfolk County, Massachusetts
