= Hemlock Gorge Reservation =

State park in Massachusetts, USA

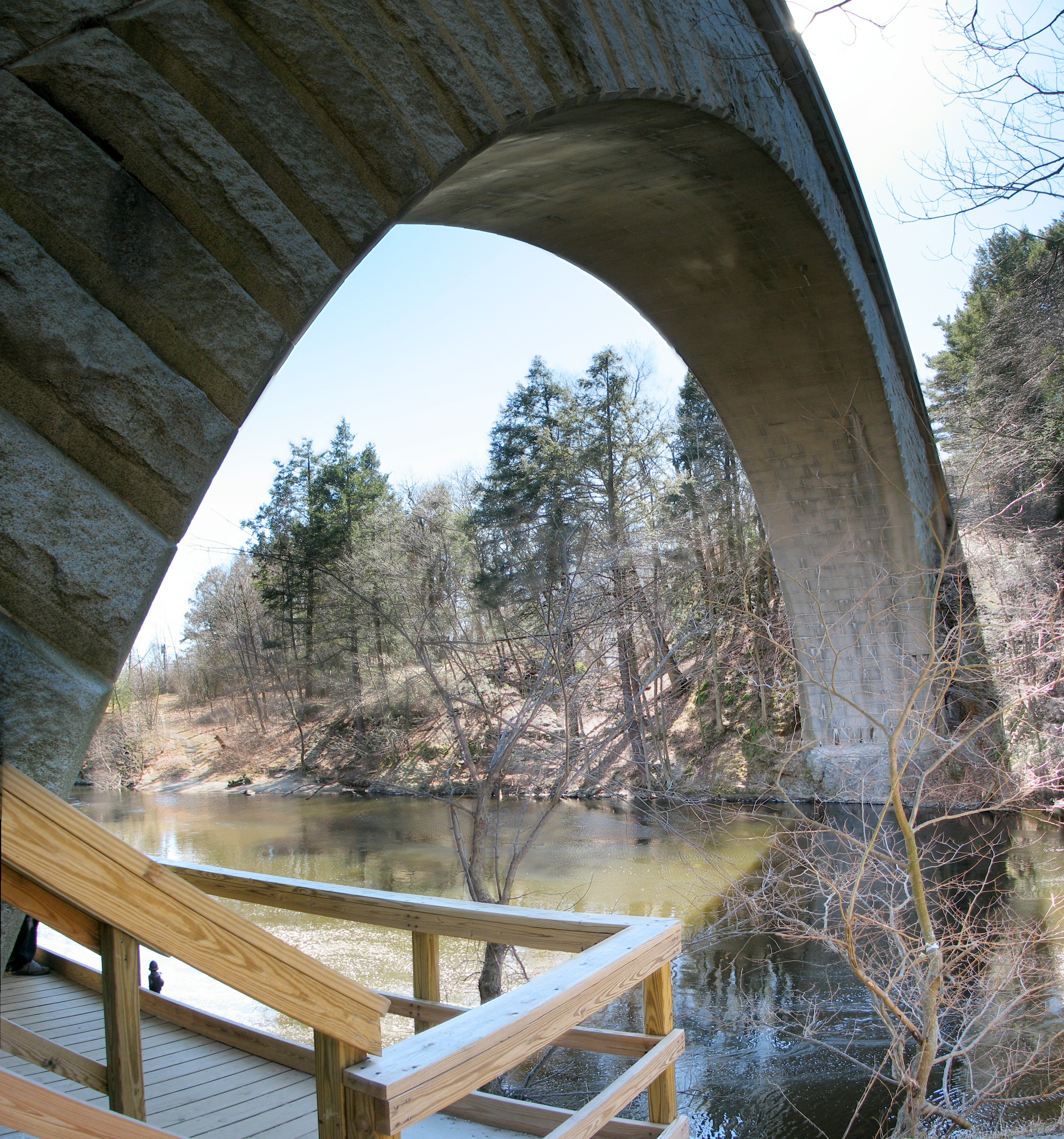
- View through Echo Bridge

- Location within Greater Boston area Location within Massachusetts Location within the United States
- Location: Newton Upper Falls and Needham, Massachusetts, United States
- Coordinates: 42°18′52″N 71°13′35″W
- Area: 23 acres (9.3 ha)
- Elevation: 79 ft (24 m)
- Established: 1895
- Administrator: Massachusetts Department of Conservation and Recreation
- Website: Official website

Hemlock Gorge Reservation is a state-owned, public recreation area and urban wild comprising 23 acres (9.3 ha) on the Charles River in Newton and Needham, Massachusetts. The reservation is managed by the Massachusetts Department of Conservation and Recreation.

== Description ==
An original part of the Metropolitan Park System of Greater Boston designed by landscape architect Charles Eliot in the 1890s, Hemlock Gorge Reservation protects the banks of the Charles River where it passes through the corners of Needham and Newton Upper Falls. The park takes its name from a gorge through which a side branch of the Charles River once passed, whose ledges were, according to Eliot, "clothed with hemlocks". The side channel was cut off in the 20th century by the construction of nearby Route 9, and water flowing through the gorge now enters a holding pond, called New Pond, from which water is returned to the river when water levels are low.

The main features are the steep Hemlock Gorge, the river, and Echo Bridge, a carrier of the Sudbury Aqueduct, which now forms part of backup systems of the Boston area water supply. The bridge was designated a National Historic Landmark in 1982. A platform under the bridge's central arch lets visitors hear the echo that earned the bridge its name. At the northern end of the park, just before the river flows under Route 9, it flows over a horseshoe-shaped dam constructed in the early 20th century at a site that housed a mill as early as the 18th century.

Hiking trails start at the parking lots on Hamilton Place in Needham and on Ellis Street in Newton. Trails on both sides of the river connect with the trail on top of Echo Bridge. A loop hike is possible by crossing the Charles on the sidewalk of the Route 9 frontage road.

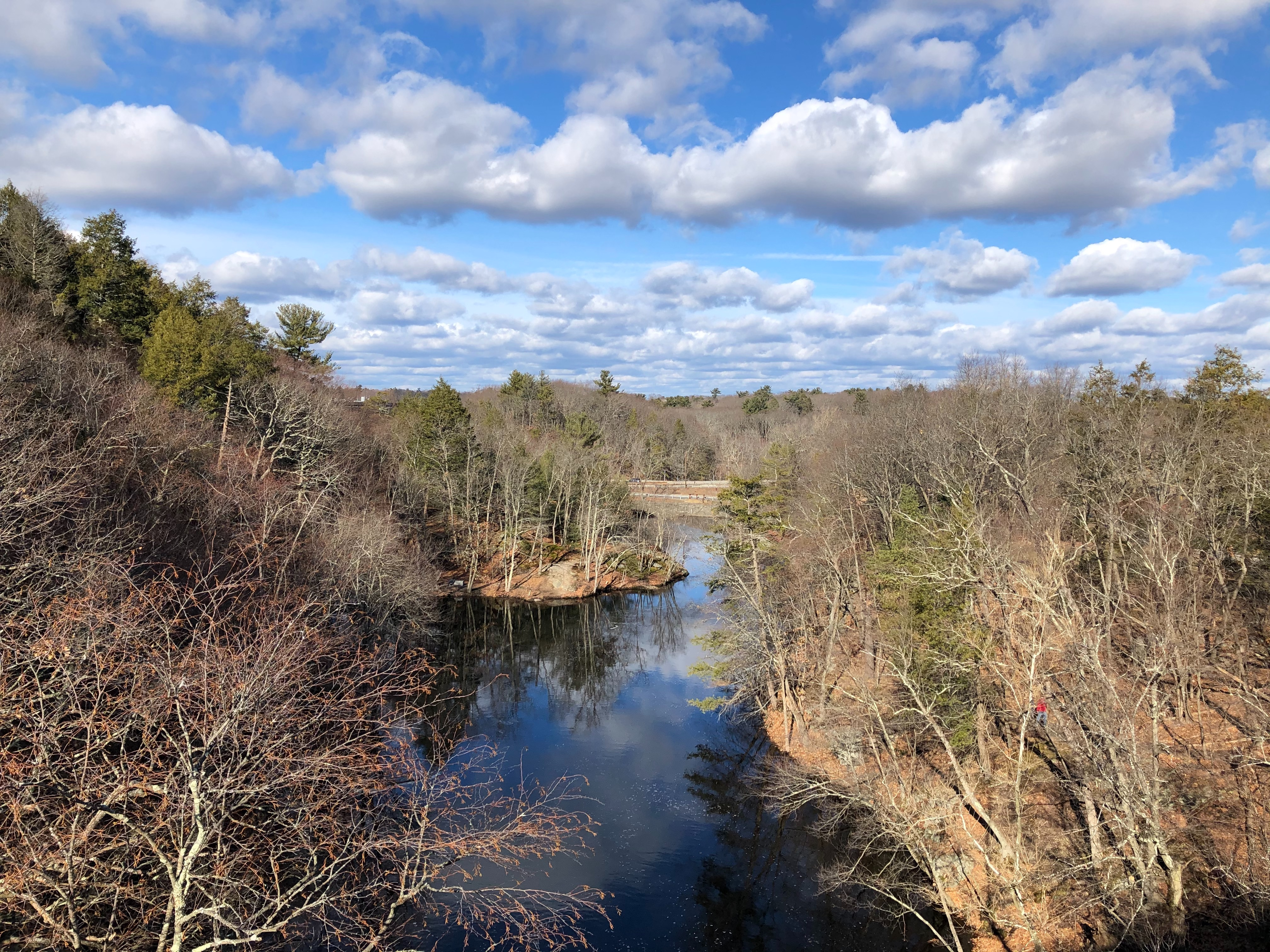
View of Hemlock Gorge looking north from Echo Bridge
