= MusiConnects =

musiConnects is a non-profit music education organization and chamber music residency based in the Mattapan and Roslindale neighborhoods of Boston, Massachusetts. The organization's mission is to "model and teach self-expression, peer leadership and community development through the transformative power of chamber music." Founded in 2007 by violinist Betsy Hinkle, musiConnects operates two education programs and a concert season of chamber music performances in neighborhood venues such as schools, community centers, libraries, health centers, and assisted living communities.

== History and programs ==
In 2007, violinist Betsy Hinkle founded musiConnects as a chamber music residency at the James J. Chittick Elementary School in Mattapan, consisting of concerts, private lessons, and chamber music instruction. As of the 2020-21 season, the musiConnects Residency Program enrolls 40-50 students in tuition-free private lessons and small group instruction at partner organizations in and around Boston's Mattapan neighborhood: KIPP Academy Boston, BCYF Mattahunt Community Center, Boston Public Schools Mattahunt Elementary, and Lena Park Community Development Corporation. The musiConnects Roslindale Community Program enrolls 30-40 students in sliding-scale tuition private lessons at the organization's studio space in Roslindale Village.

musiConnects' first resident ensembles were the Boston Public Quartet (2007-2018) and the Sumner Quartet (2011-2018). The organization is currently staffed by six Resident Musician teaching artists and one full-time Executive Director.
