= Weston Ski Track =

Ski area in Weston, Massachusetts

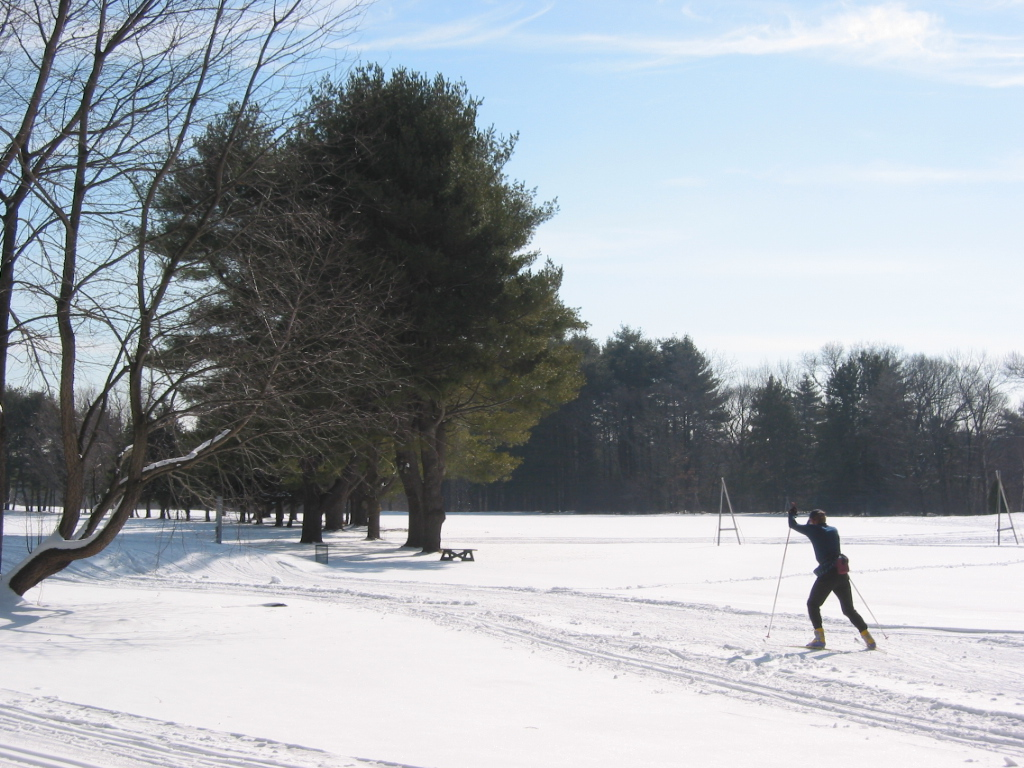
- Interactive map of Weston Ski Track
- Location: Weston, Massachusetts
- Nearest city: Boston, Massachusetts
- Coordinates: 42°20′00″N 71°16′02″W
- Base elevation: 15 m (49 ft)
- Skiable area: 15km
- Trails: 5
- Snowmaking: 14%
- Night skiing: 14%
- Website: Weston Ski Track

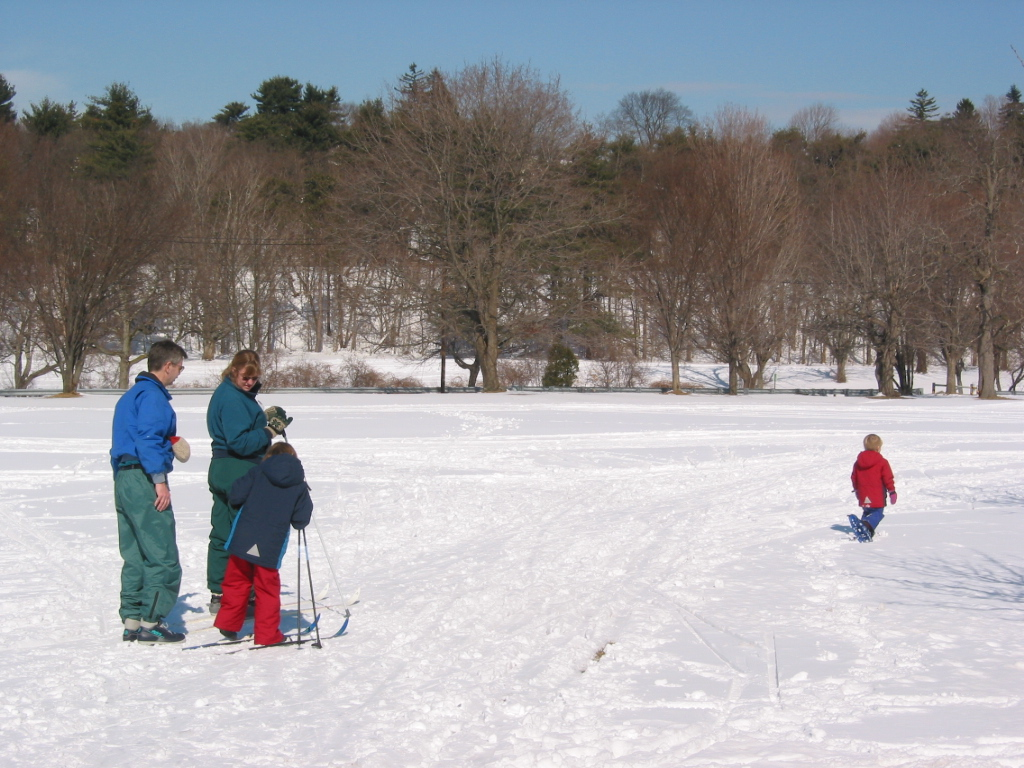
A family skiing and snowshoeing

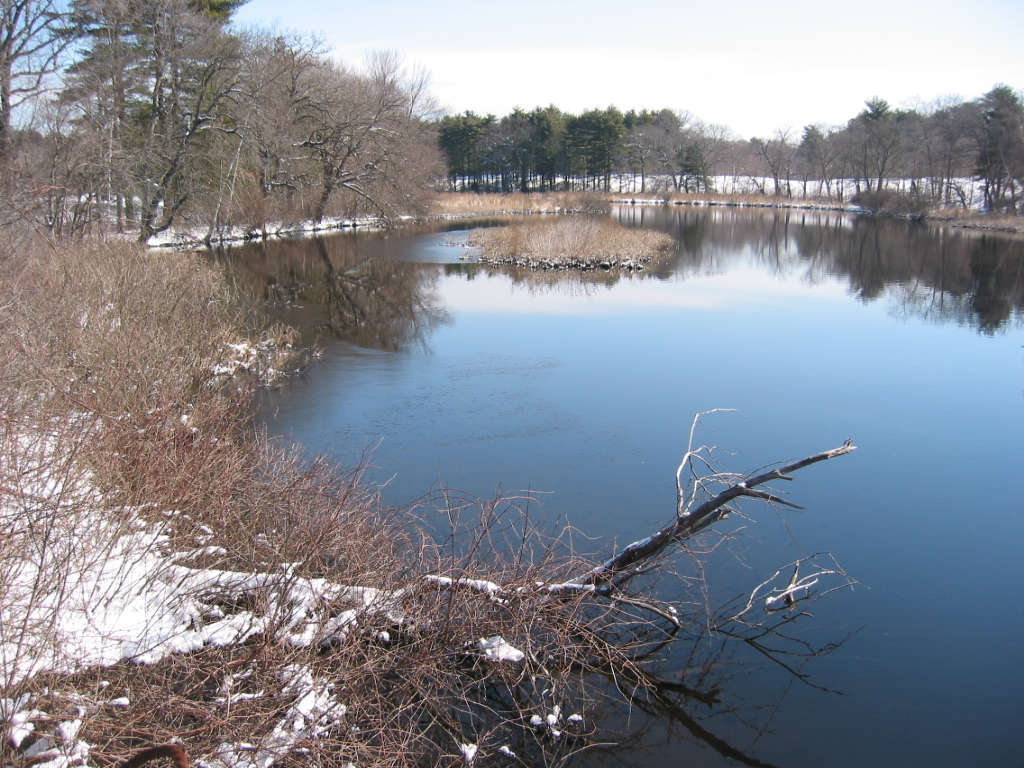
The Charles River is adjacent to the track

Weston Ski Track (Officially known as the Leo J. Martin Ski Track) is a cross-country ski and snowshoeing area located in Weston, Massachusetts. The facility is managed by the Massachusetts Department of Conservation and Recreation and is situated along the Charles River, approximately 13 miles west of downtown Boston, Massachusetts.

The ski track, open seasonally (typically December through March), provides a 2 kilometer lit ski loop with snowmaking, along with an additional 13 kilometers of groomed trails which are dependent on natural snowfall. In the warmer months, the land is used as the Leo J. Martin Golf Course.

Trails at Weston Ski Track are groomed for both skate and classic techniques. The facility also serves as the home of the Eastern Massachusetts Bill Koch League junior Nordic ski program, in addition to a number of local high school, collegiate, and masters nordic ski teams in the surrounding region. Races geared towards disabled skiers and veterans have been hosted at the center, as a hub for adaptive skiing in the area.

Skiers can walk across a bridge to access additional groomed trails within the town of Newton, MA.

Lessons and equipment rentals are available on-site, including an indoor ski center with locker room facilities. Trails are maintained by a PistenBulley 100 groomer and LED lighting provides the opportunity for night skiing.

== Management ==
Weston Ski Track was founded in 1974 and has continually operated at the same location.

In 2015, the ski track underwent a shift from private to public management, as the Massachusetts DCR took over responsibility for facility operations and maintenance from Charles River Recreation, the previous operator. Retail operations including a ski shop and equipment rentals are remain under the purview of Charles River Recreation.
