= Saco–Lowell Shops Housing Historic District =

Historic district in Massachusetts, United States

- U.S. National Register of Historic Places
- U.S. Historic district
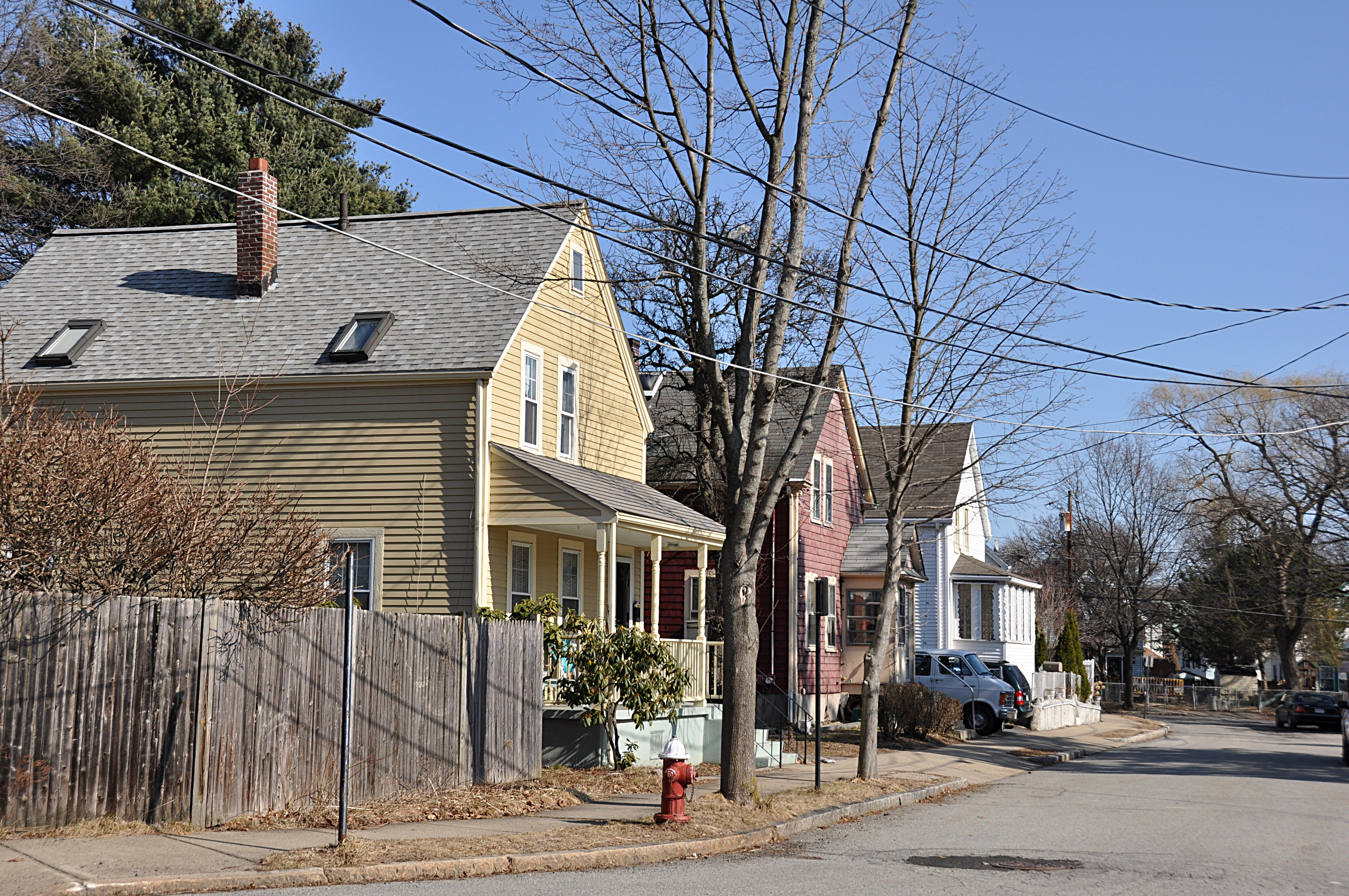
- A street scene in the district

- Location within Massachusetts Location within the United States
- Location: Oak, Williams, Butts, and Saco Sts., Newton, Massachusetts
- Coordinates: 42°18′27″N 71°13′14″W
- Built: 1919
- Architectural style: Colonial Revival
- MPS: Newton MRA
- NRHP reference No.: 90000016
- Added to NRHP: February 16, 1990

The Saco–Lowell Shops Housing Historic District encompasses the only 20th-century factory working housing enclave in the city of Newton, Massachusetts. It is located in Newton Upper Falls, near the Saco–Pettee Machine Shops, and was developed to provide housing for employees of the machinery manufacturers located there. It is roughly bounded by Oak, Williams, Butts, and Saco Streets, and includes eight small-scale brick houses with vernacular Colonial Revival styling. These houses were built in 1919 and 1920, adjoining a small number of worker houses built in the early 1890s. The district was listed on the National Register of Historic Places in 1990.

== Description and history ==
The Saco–Pettee Machine Shops complex is located on the north side of Oak Street in Newton Upper Falls. This industrial complex was founded in 1830, and was by the late 19th century the city's largest employer, producing equipment for use in textile mills. As part of a reform movement to improve the conditions of factory movements, the company decided to build a small subdivision of worker housing units across Oak Street from the factory. A plan was drafted in 1919 for eight houses to be constructed within the existing cluster of houses located on Williams, Butts, and Saco Streets. The houses on these streets had been built primarily in the 1890s by others, and are vernacular wood-frame houses.

The houses built by the company are one and two-family brick structures, with variants of then-popular Colonial Revival styling. The house at 41 Butts Street is a fairly typical single-family residence, two stories in height, with a saltbox profile. Five other houses in the district are similar, varying principally in their roof line. The houses at 4-6 Saco Street and 135-139 Oak Street were designed as multi-family residences, with gable sections set at right angles, and a more distinctly Greek Revival style to their trim.

== See also ==
- National Register of Historic Places listings in Newton, Massachusetts
