= Saco–Pettee Machine Shops =

- U.S. National Register of Historic Places
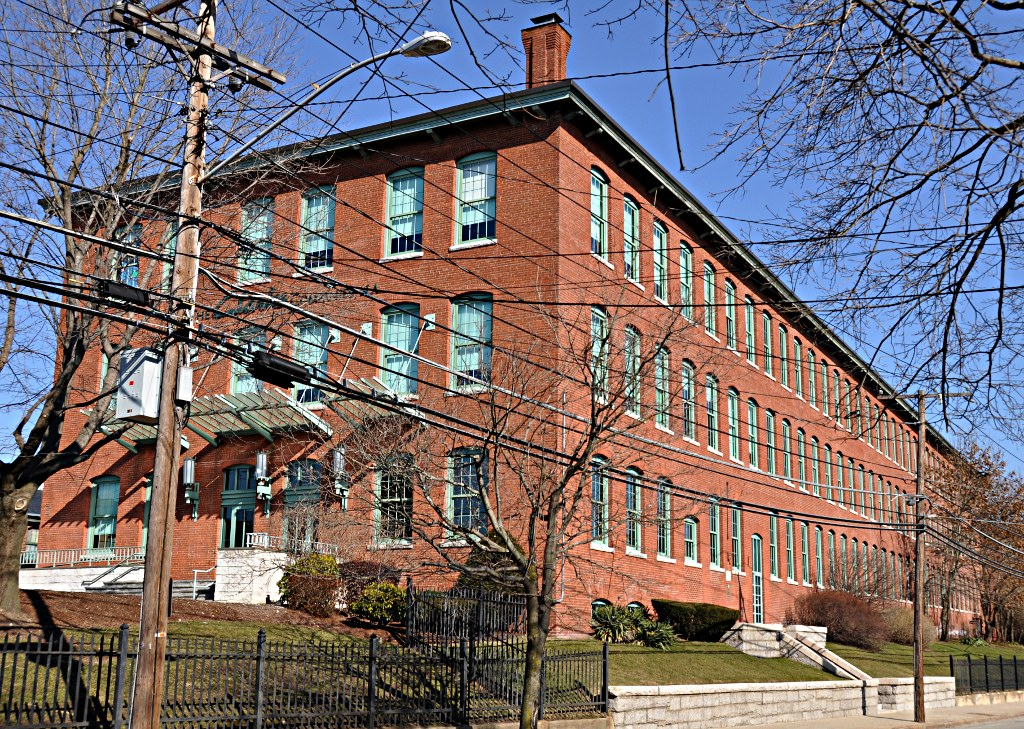

- Location within Massachusetts Location within the United States
- Location: 156 Oak St., Newton, Massachusetts
- Coordinates: 42°18′29″N 71°13′2″W
- Built: 1893
- Architect: Lockwood, Greene & Co.
- Architectural style: Industrial
- MPS: Newton MRA
- NRHP reference No.: 86001964
- Added to NRHP: December 23, 1986

The Saco–Pettee Machine Shops is a historic factory complex at 156 Oak Street in the Newton Upper Falls area of Newton, Massachusetts. Although the area has an industrial history dating to the early 19th century, the oldest buildings in this complex, consisting of about thirteen brick buildings, were built in 1892. The property, a major economic force in the development of Newton Upper Falls, was listed on the National Register of Historic Places in 1986. It was home to Clark's N.A., the North American home base to Clark's Shoes, makers of fine footwear, until they relocated to Waltham Ma. in October 2016.

== Description and history ==
The Saco–Pettee Machine Shops are located at the northwest corner of Oak and Needham Streets, just north of a bend in the Charles River. It consists of a cluster of interconnected brick buildings, one to three stories in height, most of which date to the turn of the 20th century. All are built out of red brick, and most were designed by Lockwood, Green & Co. of Boston, giving them a consistent appearance. Although the site has been used since the 1830s for industrial purposes, nothing is known to survive from that period.

Otis Pettee began manufacturing equipment for the processing of cotton in the 1823, at first for a mill located downstream on the Charles. In 1830 he established his own shop on this site, and began a profitable textile equipment processing manufacturer that supplied mills from New England to Mexico. The business was continued by two generations of descendants, incorporating as the Pettee Machine Shop in 1880. The oldest surviving building of this complex was built in 1893, when the business began specializing in the production of punched cards for controlling looms. In 1897 Pettee merged with the Saco Water Power Shop, expanding its product line to include virtually all mill equipment except looms. The next major period of expansion was 1910–1913, highlighted by the company's acquisition of Lowell Machine Shops in 1912. Business declined in the 1920s, and the company closed its Newton operation in 1932, consolidating operations at Saco, Maine.

== See also ==
- Saco-Lowell Shops Housing Historic District
- National Register of Historic Places listings in Newton, Massachusetts
