= Sudbury Aqueduct =

- Sudbury Aqueduct Linear District
- U.S. National Register of Historic Places
- U.S. Historic district
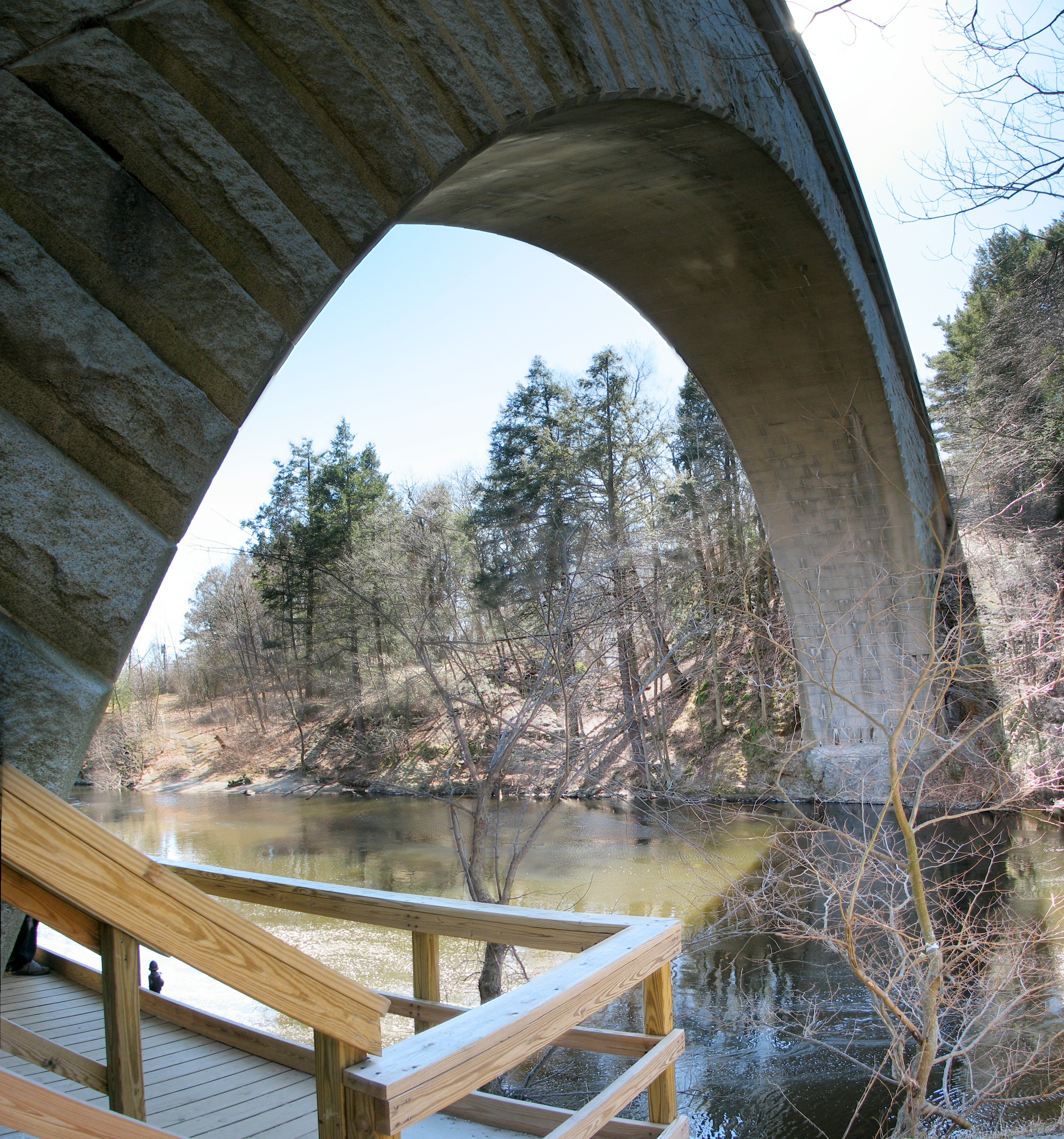
- North side of Echo Bridge which carries Sudbury Aqueduct over the Charles River between Needham and Newton

- Location within Massachusetts Location within the United States
- Location: Framingham, Sherborn, Natick, Wellesley, Needham, and Newton, Massachusetts, United States
- Built: 1878
- Architect: George A. Clough
- MPS: Water Supply System of Metropolitan Boston MPS
- NRHP reference No.: 89002293
- Added to NRHP: January 18, 1990

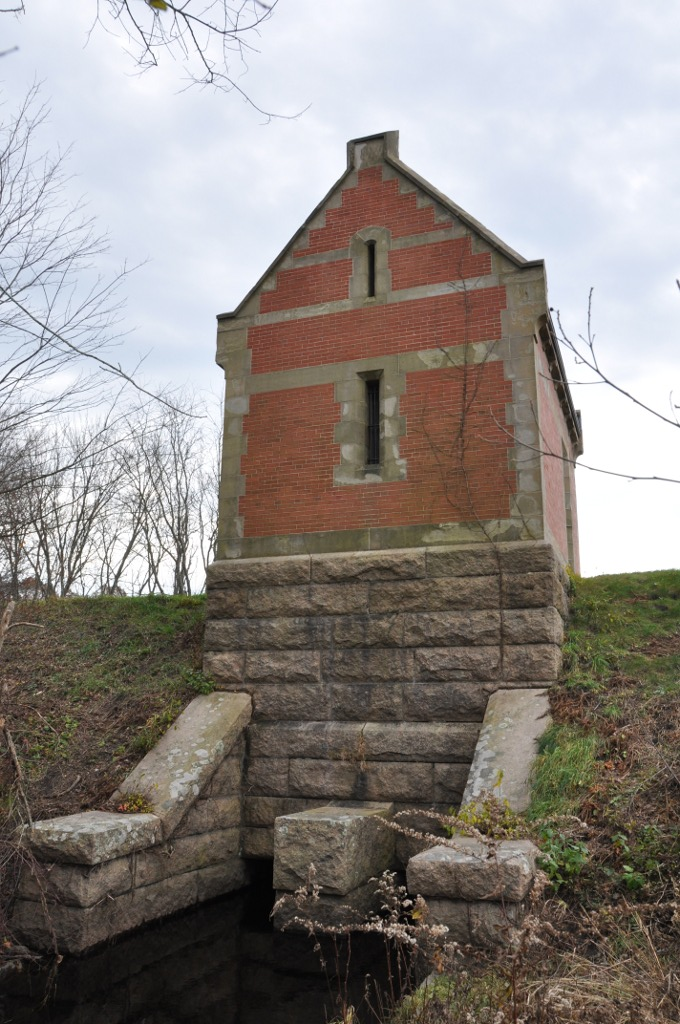
Waste Weir A and its control house in Sherborn

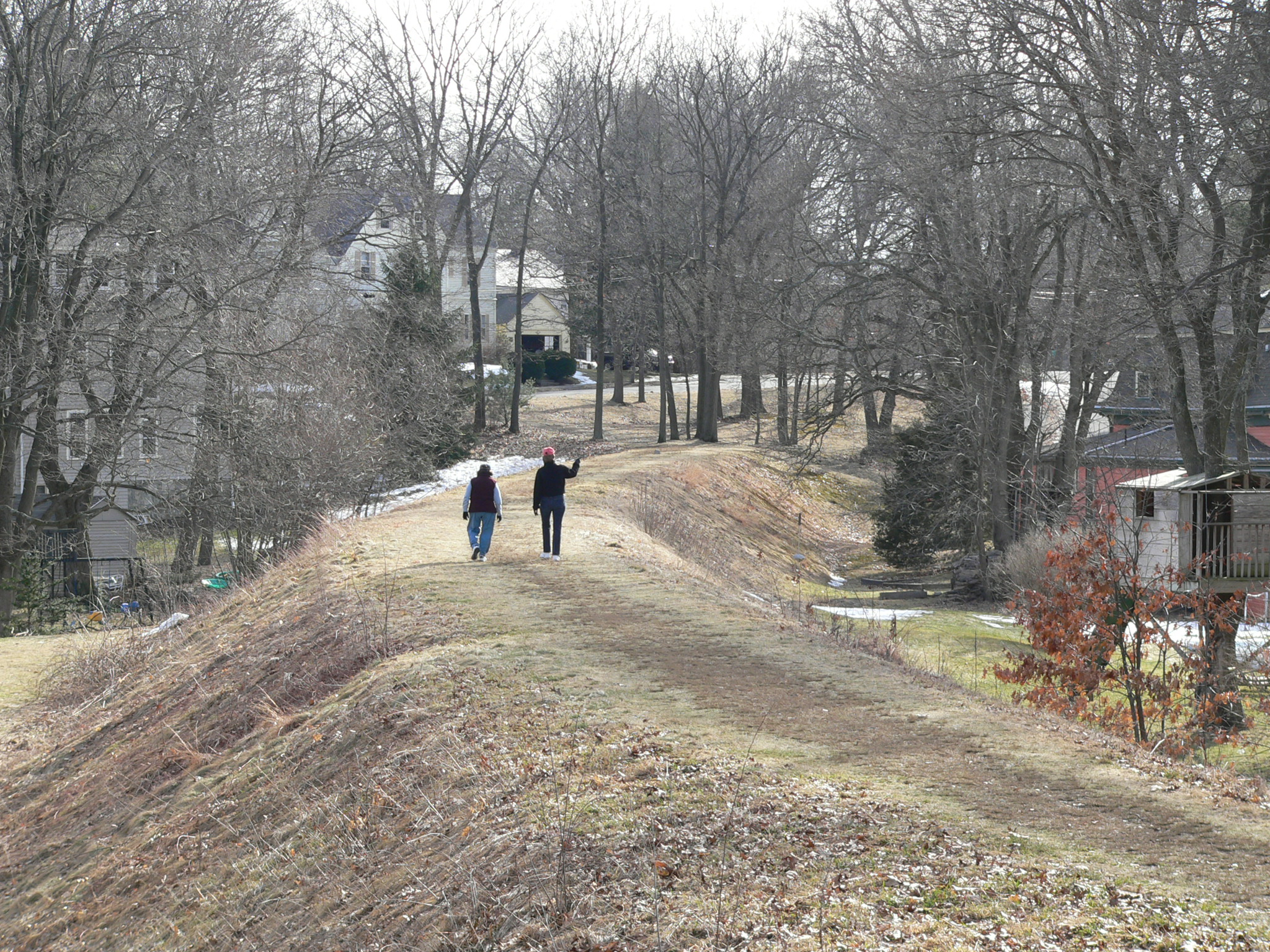
Walkers on the aqueduct in Newton

The Sudbury Aqueduct is an aqueduct in Massachusetts. It runs for 16 miles (26 km) from Farm Pond at Waverly Street in Framingham to Chestnut Hill Reservoir in Boston's Chestnut Hill neighborhood. A later built extension main runs from the Farm Pond gatehouse to the gatehouse at the Stearns Reservoir (Framingham Reservoir #1) where additional mains connect to the Brackett and Foss Reservoirs (Framingham #2 and #3.) Going east from Framingham, it runs through Sherborn before entering Natick. From Natick it runs east through Wellesley and Needham to the Charles River, which it crosses on the Echo Bridge into Newton. It ends at the Chestnut Hill Reservoir on the Newton side of the Newton-Boston line. The Massachusetts Water Resources Authority (MWRA) operates the aqueduct.

== Construction ==
The Sudbury Aqueduct was constructed between 1875 and 1878, and was in use for almost 100 years. It was designed to carry water from the watershed of the Sudbury River to Boston and its surrounding communities. Reservoirs in Framingham and Southborough were constructed to impound this water at the time of the aqueduct's development, and additional reservoirs in Ashland and Hopkinton were constructed in the 1880s in an attempt to meet increased demand. Finally in the 1890s the Sudbury Reservoir was created in 1898, significantly increasing the amount of water available for distribution. For most of the Sudbury Aqueduct's history after the Sudbury Reservoir was built the water was primarily sourced from the Foss Reservoir which the Sudbury Reservoir feeds with Reservoirs #1 and #2 serving as reserve supply due to the Sudbury Reservoir's superior water quality over the Reservoir #2 system.

The aqueduct consists primarily of a horseshoe-shaped brick lining that is 8.5 feet (2.6 m) in diameter and 7.667 feet (2.337 m) high. The bricks are set in concrete atop a foundation of concrete and stone rubble. The aqueduct is covered by an arch built of brick. The aqueduct was initially designed to carry 80 million gallons of water per day, limited by the Rosemary Brook Siphon. An additional barrel was later added to the Rosemary Brook Siphon increasing the design capacity to 110 mgd. The main conduit from Farm Pond to Chestnut Hill Reservoir is inclined one foot per mile. At a number of places on the aqueduct small buildings were built to house control equipment of various sorts. These include a gate house at Farm Pond (abandoned after a channel was constructed feeding the aqueduct from Framingham Reservoirs #1–3 due to poor water quality at Farm Pond), a metering house in southeastern Framingham, and control houses over weirs where the aqueduct crosses over other bodies of water. These control points allow water from the aqueduct to be diverted into the watersheds it crosses. There are also control houses on either end of the Rosemary Brook siphon in Wellesley, where the water is sent through cast iron pipes to traverse an extended low spot on the route. This stretch of the aqueduct illustrates a number of the techniques used in its construction: parts of the aqueduct here are raised on an embankment, while others are in a cut, due to significant changes in local topography. Portions of the aqueduct in Natick and Newton were created by tunneling, the longest being a 4,635-foot (1,413 m) tunnel in Newton. In addition to the Echo Bridge, the aqueduct also passes over the "Waban Arches" bridge. Located in Wellesley near the Elm Bank Reservation, this nine-arch bridge carries the aqueduct across a valley containing Waban Brook near its mouth at the Charles River. The aqueduct formally ends at a terminal house just above the Chestnut Hill Reservoir in Newton.

== Relegation to backup service ==
In the 20th century the aqueduct's functions were first augmented and then replaced by the Weston Aqueduct, the Hultman Aqueduct, and the MetroWest Water Supply Tunnel. The aqueduct was taken out of regular service in 1978, and now forms part of the MWRA's emergency backup systems. Along with the Weston Aqueduct it is one of two emergency backup transmission aqueducts to carry water from the Sudbury and Foss reservoirs, MWRA's backup sources. If brought online water would enter the Sudbury aqueduct at its gatehouse at the Stearns Reservoir (Framingham #1) from two 48 inch pipes from the Foss Reservoir (Framingham #3) which is in turn fed by an open channel from the Sudbury Reservoir. The water would then pass through the aqueduct and enter Chestnut Hill Reservoir where it could then be taken into the water system. The aqueduct formerly could also be fed directly by the Stearns and Brackett reservoirs (Framingham #1 and #2) and Farm Pond as well as indirectly by Whitehall Pond, Ashland Reservoir, and Hopkinton Reservoir which discharge into the Bracket Reservoir; for water quality reasons generally only the Foss Reservoir was regularly used for most of the aqueduct's history and is the only one of the reservoirs that is still maintained as an emergency water source.

It was put into emergency use on May 1, 2010, when a 10-foot (3.0 m) wide supply pipe (only seven years old) broke in Weston. Clean water was directed through alternate pipelines to bypass the break, but to provide all the water needed, the Massachusetts Water Resources Authority supplemented the water supply by tapping the Chestnut Hill Reservoir; water from the Sudbury Reservoir and Foss Reservoir was sent through the Sudbury Aqueduct to Chestnut Hill to keep that supply going. The Chestnut Hill water was untreated, so about 2 million residents in about 30 communities in the Boston area were under orders for about three days to disinfect tap water by boiling. Later testing showed that the water was of good quality and safe to drink.

On January 18, 1990, the route, buildings and structures associated with the aqueduct were added to the National Register of Historic Places as the Sudbury Aqueduct Linear District. Much of the aqueduct's route is open to the public as an unimproved walking trail.
