= Moses King =

American publisher (1853–1909)

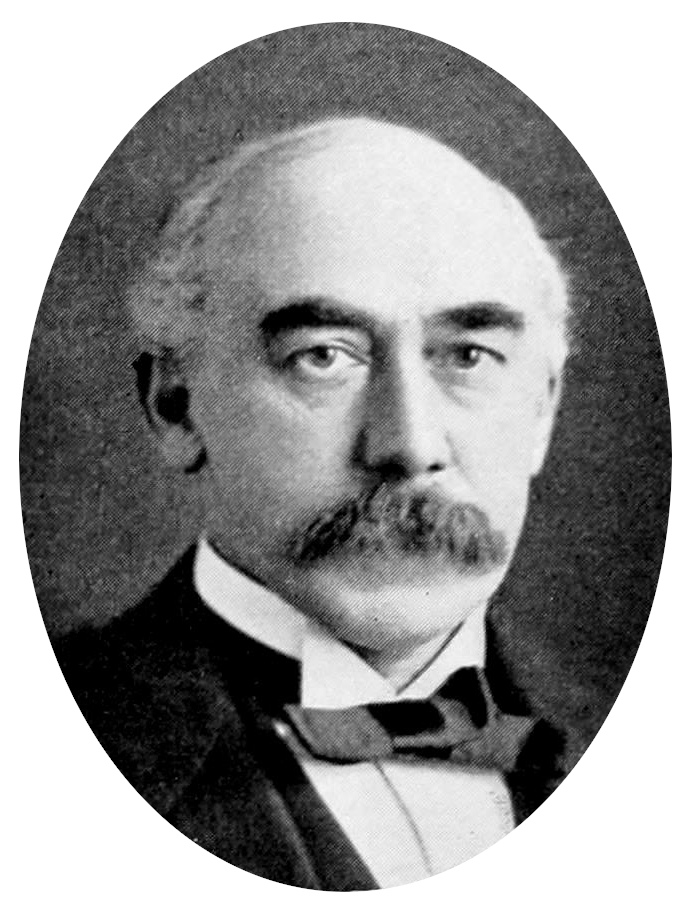
Moses King

Moses King (April 13, 1853 – June 12, 1909) was an editor and publisher who produced guidebooks to travel destinations in the United States, including Massachusetts and New York.

== Biography ==
King was born in Shoreditch, London, UK, to David Woolf King and Sarah Lazarus. He grew up in St. Louis, Missouri.

After working for several years, he returned to school and graduated from Phillips Exeter Academy in 1879 and Harvard College in 1881, at age 28. He published his first guidebook while still in college, titled Harvard and its Surroundings.

After college he held a series of jobs in the publishing industry, working for Science magazine, Bradstreet's magazine, and Rand-Avery Co. He married Bertha Maria Cloyes in 1881; they had three children.

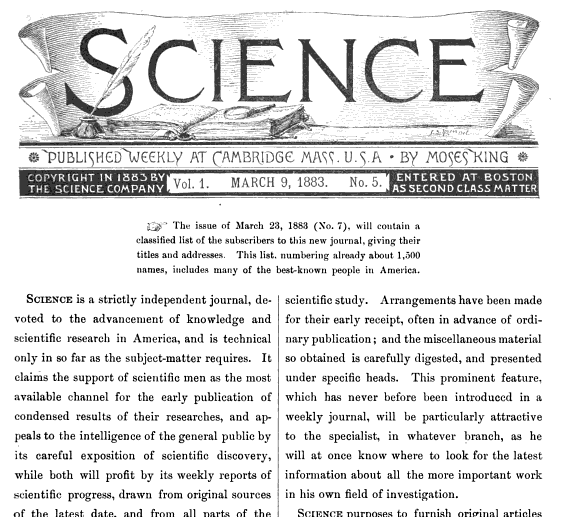
Science v.1, no.5, 1883, published by Moses King

He steadily published travel guidebooks from 1878 onwards. By 1888 he formally established the Moses King Corporation. King's illustrated publications about Boston, New York City, Philadelphia, and elsewhere in the U.S. received generally positive reviews. King published a few handbooks in the Boston area that were written by Moses Forster Sweetser (1848-1897), such as the King's Handbook of the Boston Harbor. M. F. Sweetser was an author and a manuscript writer of many works. The more popular titles of King's publications returned in updated editions.

One darker chapter in King's career occurred in June 1893. During a business meeting in New York, King and photographer Arthur G. Massey engaged in an altercation resulting in Massey filing a lawsuit alleging that King had pulled out part of Massey's beard. Plaintiff demanded $10,000 in damages.

In 1894 King moved from Boston to New York, where he remained until his death in 1909.

== Selected works ==
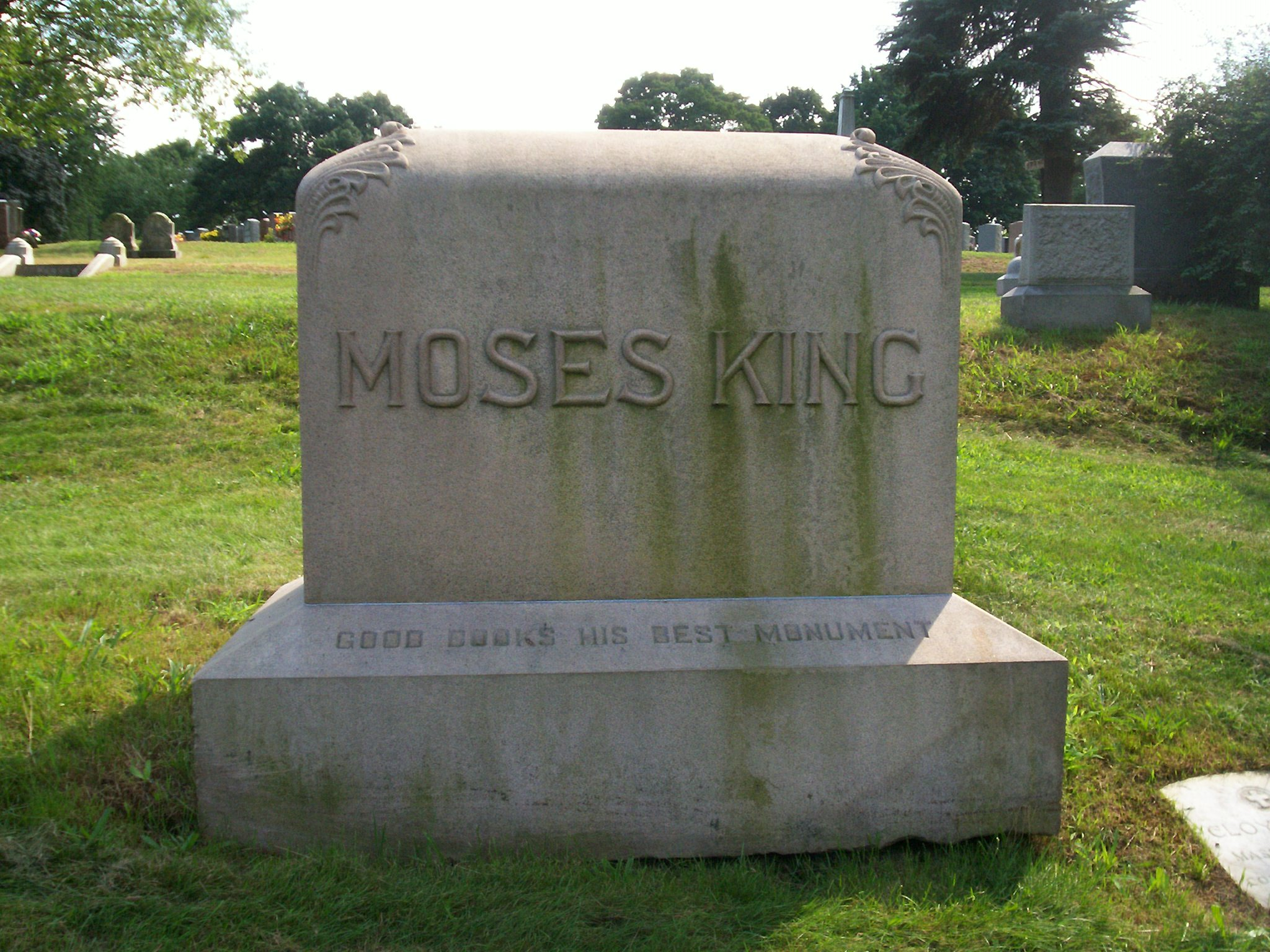
Grave of Moses King in Cambridge Cemetery

=== Boston and Massachusetts ===
- Harvard & its surroundings. Cambridge, Massachusetts, King, 1878, 1880.
- King's hand-book of Boston. Cambridge, Massachusetts, M. King, 1878, 1889.
- Moses King (1880). The Back-Bay District and the Vendome. Boston.
- King's handbook of Springfield, Massachusetts. Springfield, Massachusetts, J.D. Gill, 1884.
- With Moses Forster Sweetser. King's handbook of Boston Harbour. Boston : Moses King Corporation, 1889.
- With Moses Forster Sweetser. King's handbook of Newton, Massachusetts. 1889.
- King's how to see Boston: a trustworthy guide-book. Boston, Mass. : Moses King, 1895.
- Harvard University: eighty photographic views selected from "King's handbook of Harvard University". Boston : M. King, 1895, 1896.

=== New York City ===
- King's handbook of New York city; an outline history and description of the American metropolis. Boston, Mass. : Moses King, 1892, 1893.
- King's photographic views of New York. Boston, M. King, ©1895.
- King's views of the New York Stock Exchange. New York : M. King, 1897.
- King's views of Grant's tomb, New York city; dedication, 27 April 1897. New York, M. King, 1897.
- The Dewey reception in New York City : nine-hundred and eighty views and portraits. [New York] : M. King, 1899
- Notable New Yorkers of 1896-1899; a companion volume to King's Handbook of New York City. New York, King, 1899.
- New York's rapid transit tunnel and underground railway. New York : Moses King, 1900.
- King's views of Brooklyn. New York, M. King, 1904.
- King's color-graphs of New York city New York, Carl H. Krieg & Co., 1910.

=== Philadelphia ===
- King's Views of Philadelphia. N.Y., 1900.
- The city and country homes of Philadelphians. Moses King, 1902.
- Philadelphia and notable Philadelphians. New York: Moses King, 1902.
- Peirce School in Philadelphia. New York: Moses King, 1904
- Philadelphia Industrial Parade. Philadelphia : Moses King, 1908.
- Olde Philadelphia: The Birthplace of the Nation!. Philadelphia: Moses King, 1908.

=== Elsewhere ===
- King's pocket-book of Cincinnati. J. Shillito & Co., 1879.
- King's pocket-book of Providence, R.I. Tibbitts & Shaw, 1882.
- With Moses Forster Sweetser. King's handbook of the United States. Buffalo : King, 1891.
- Where to stop. A guide to the best hotels of the world, alphabetically by cities. Boston: M. King. 1894.
- A California paradise—home, gardens and studio of Paul de Longpré, the pre-eminent flower artist: Hollywood, superb suburb of Los Angeles. New York : M. King, 1904.
