= Newton Upper Falls =

Village in Massachusetts

- Newton Upper Falls Historic District
- U.S. National Register of Historic Places
- U.S. Historic district
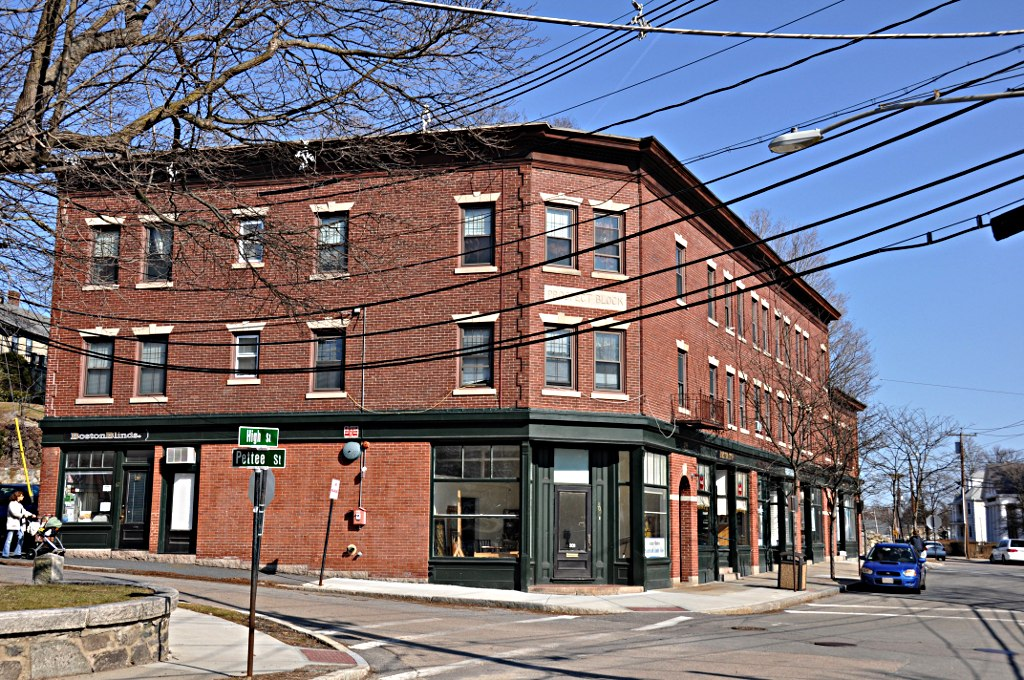
- the center of Newton Upper Falls

- Location within Greater Boston area Location within Massachusetts Location within the United States
- Location: Roughly bounded by Boylston, Elliot, and Oak Sts., and the Charles River, Newton, Massachusetts
- Coordinates: 42°18′49″N 71°13′23″W
- Area: 70 acres (28 ha)
- Architect: Fteley, Alphonse; Zettler, F.X., Raggi, Gonippo, et al
- Architectural style: Greek Revival, Late Victorian, Gothic Revival
- MPS: Newton MRA
- NRHP reference No.: 86001750
- Added to NRHP: September 4, 1986

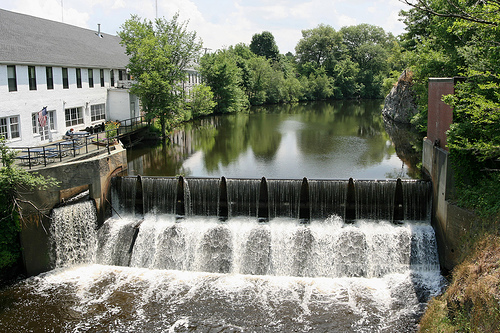
Waterfalls abutting Echo Bridge

Newton Upper Falls is one of the thirteen villages within the city of Newton in Massachusetts, United States. The village is listed as the Newton Upper Falls Historic District on the National Register of Historic Places.

== Geography ==
The area borders Needham, Massachusetts to the southwest, Wellesley, Massachusetts to the west, the West Roxbury neighborhood of Boston to the southeast, Newton Highlands to the north and northeast, Waban to the northwest and Oak Hill to the east.

The village is served by Eliot "T" station, part of the Green Line D branch of the MBTA, with rail service inbound into downtown Boston and outbound to Riverside. Major roads that serve the village are Route 128, and Route 9 (Boylston Street), which provides a direct, six-mile commute into downtown Boston.

Newton Upper Falls is home to the Hemlock Gorge and Echo Bridge, a aqueduct turned pedestrian walkway over the Charles River. It has over 150 homes on the historic register.

Sullivan Avenue, an unpaved private road in Newton Upper Falls, is the last remaining portion of the ancient highway connecting Boston and Cambridge with Newton and points west in the 17th century (back then it was called Cambridge Village). Also on Sullivan Avenue is a famous pothole; a geological anomaly where a boulder that was originally pushed down the cliff by a now extinct waterfall got caught and became round. The boulder spun around in its place carving a shaft over thousands of years. Since then, half the shaft collapsed and now all that can be seen is half of a cylindrical shaft through the cliff at the corner of Sullivan and Elliot Streets.

=== Historic landmarks ===
- Echo Bridge, between Ellis St and Reservoir St
- Saco–Pettee Machine Shops, 156 Oak St.
- Saco–Lowell Shops Housing Historic District

== History ==
Newton's first mill on the Charles River was built in 1688 in Upper Falls. Over the next 150 years, the water power available at Upper Falls led to the village's steady growth as many more mills were built along that stretch of the river. By 1850 the village had 1300 inhabitants which was 25% of the entire population of Newton.

In 1909, a Roman Catholic church called Mary Immaculate of Lourdes Church (Newton, Massachusetts) opened in Upper Falls.

A 60-acre (24 ha) area, including much of the area between Route 9 and Elliot Street, and east from the Charles River to Cottage Street and Hickory Cliff Road, was listed on the National Register of Historic Places in 1986.

== Notable person ==
Newton Upper Falls was also the teenage home of comedian and podcaster Joe Rogan, whence he graduated from Newton South High School in 1985.

== See also ==
- National Register of Historic Places listings in Newton, Massachusetts
