= William Kessler =

William Kessler may refer to:

- Billy Kessler, a GI Joe character
- William Kessler (handballer) (born 1962), American former handball player
- William Henry Kessler (1924–2002), American architect

== See also ==
- William F. Kessler House, a historic house in Newton, Massachusetts
