= Wheat House =

Wheat House may refer to:

in the United States (by state)

- Wheat House (Lonoke, Arkansas), listed on the National Register of Historic Places in Lonoke County, Arkansas
- Samuel Wheat House, Newton, Massachusetts, listed on the NRHP in Middlesex County, Massachusetts
- Sabin-Wheat Farm, Putney, Vermont, listed on the NRHP in Windham County, Vermont
- Wheat Row, Washington, D.C., listed on the NRHP in Washington, D.C.
