= Thomas A. Crimmins House =

Historic house in Massachusetts, United States

- U.S. National Register of Historic Places
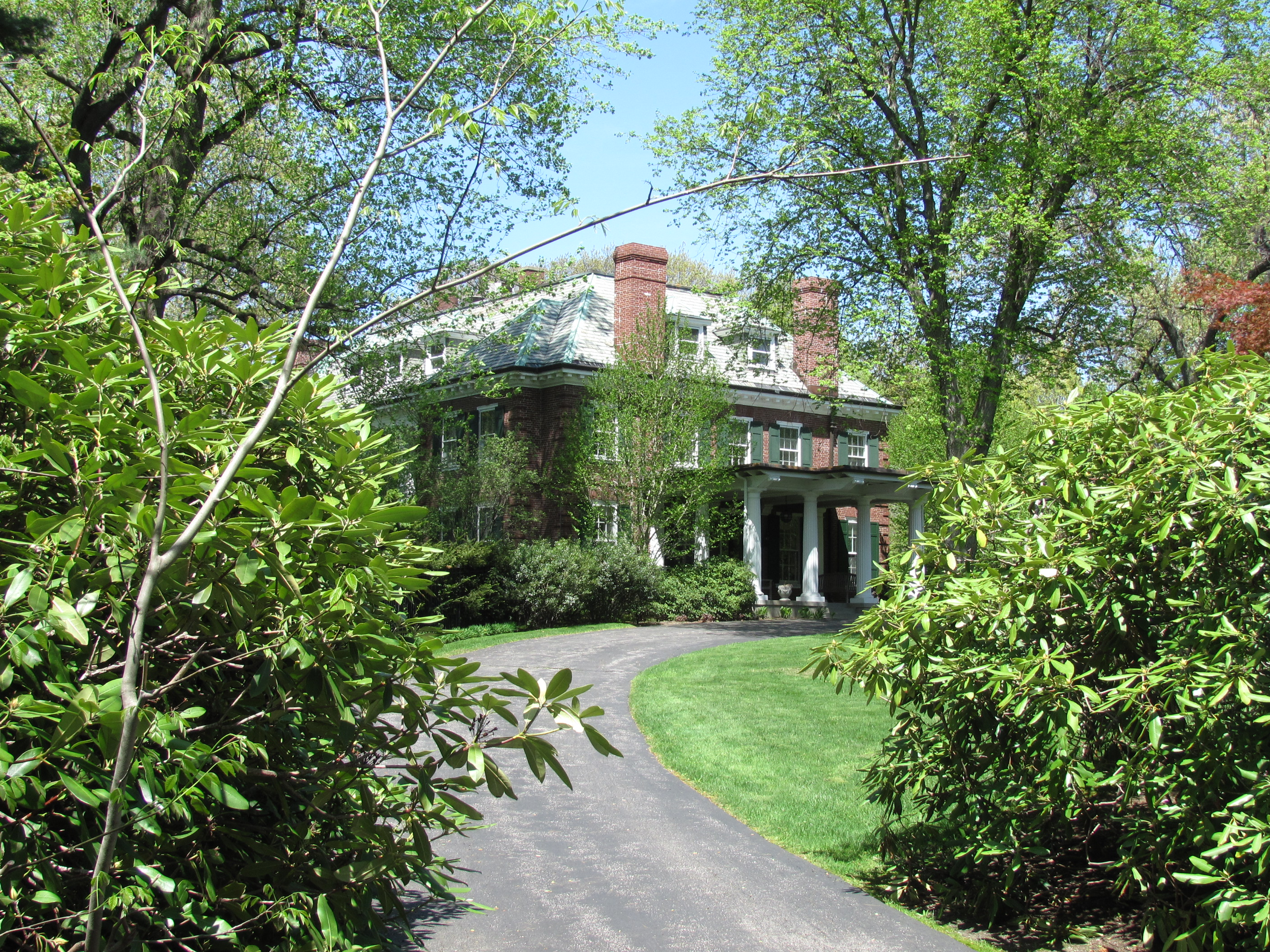
- Thomas A Crimmins House

- Location within Massachusetts Location within the United States
- Location: 19 Dartmouth St., Newton, Massachusetts
- Coordinates: 42°20′19″N 71°13′36″W
- Built: 1910
- Architectural style: Colonial Revival
- MPS: Newton MRA
- NRHP reference No.: 90000021
- Added to NRHP: February 16, 1990

The Thomas A. Crimmins House is a historic house at 19 Dartmouth Street in Newton, Massachusetts. The 2 1/2-story brick house was built in 1910–11, and is one of the city's finest Georgian Revival houses. The roughly square house has a slate hip roof with a modillioned cornice, and the corners have brick quoins. The facade facing Commonwealth Avenue has symmetrical projecting end bays flanking a center entry with monumental Tuscan columns.

The house was listed on the National Register of Historic Places in 1990.

== See also ==
- National Register of Historic Places listings in Newton, Massachusetts
