= Lafayette Goodbar House =

Historic house in Massachusetts, United States

- U.S. National Register of Historic Places
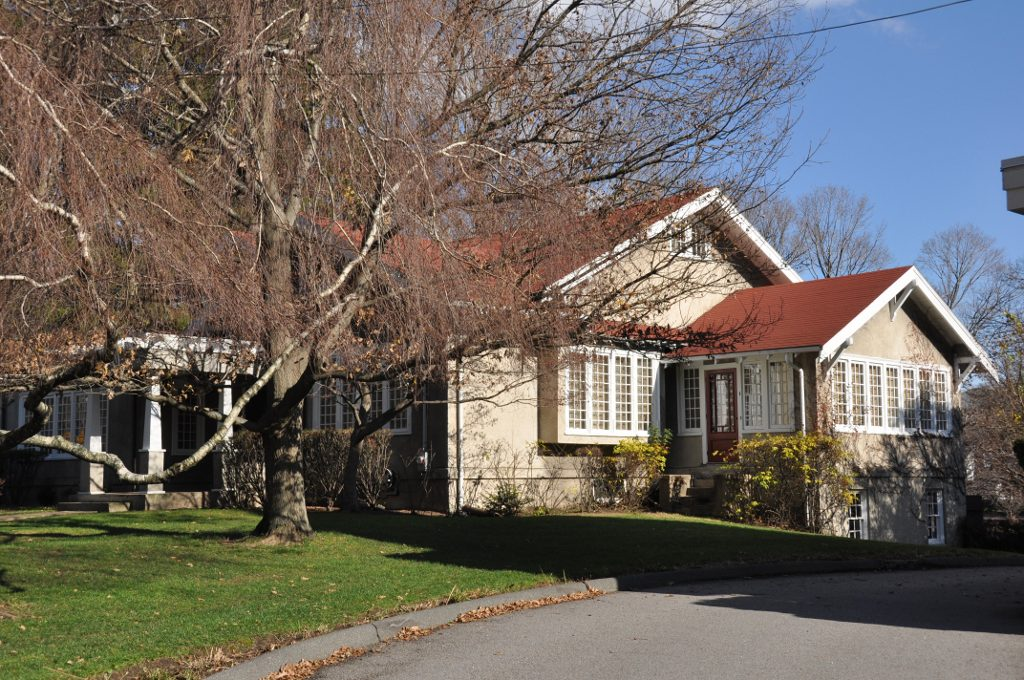

- Location within Massachusetts Location within the United States
- Location: 614 Walnut St., Newton, Massachusetts
- Coordinates: 42°20′24″N 71°12′21″W
- Built: 1914
- Architect: Rollins, Walter A.
- Architectural style: Bungalow/Craftsman
- MPS: Newton MRA
- NRHP reference No.: 90000044
- Added to NRHP: February 16, 1990

The Lafayette Goodbar House is a historic house at 614 Walnut Street in Newton, Massachusetts. Built in 1915 to a design by local architect Walter A. Rollins, it is Newton's finest example of Bungalow style architecture. It is a single story stucco-clad structure, with an overhanging gable roof that has exposed rafters. Its windows are arrayed in banks, and have small panes. There are knee braces that give visual support to the building's many gables.

The house was listed on the National Register of Historic Places in 1990.

== See also ==
- National Register of Historic Places listings in Newton, Massachusetts
