= John Souther House =

Historic house in Massachusetts, United States

- U.S. National Register of Historic Places
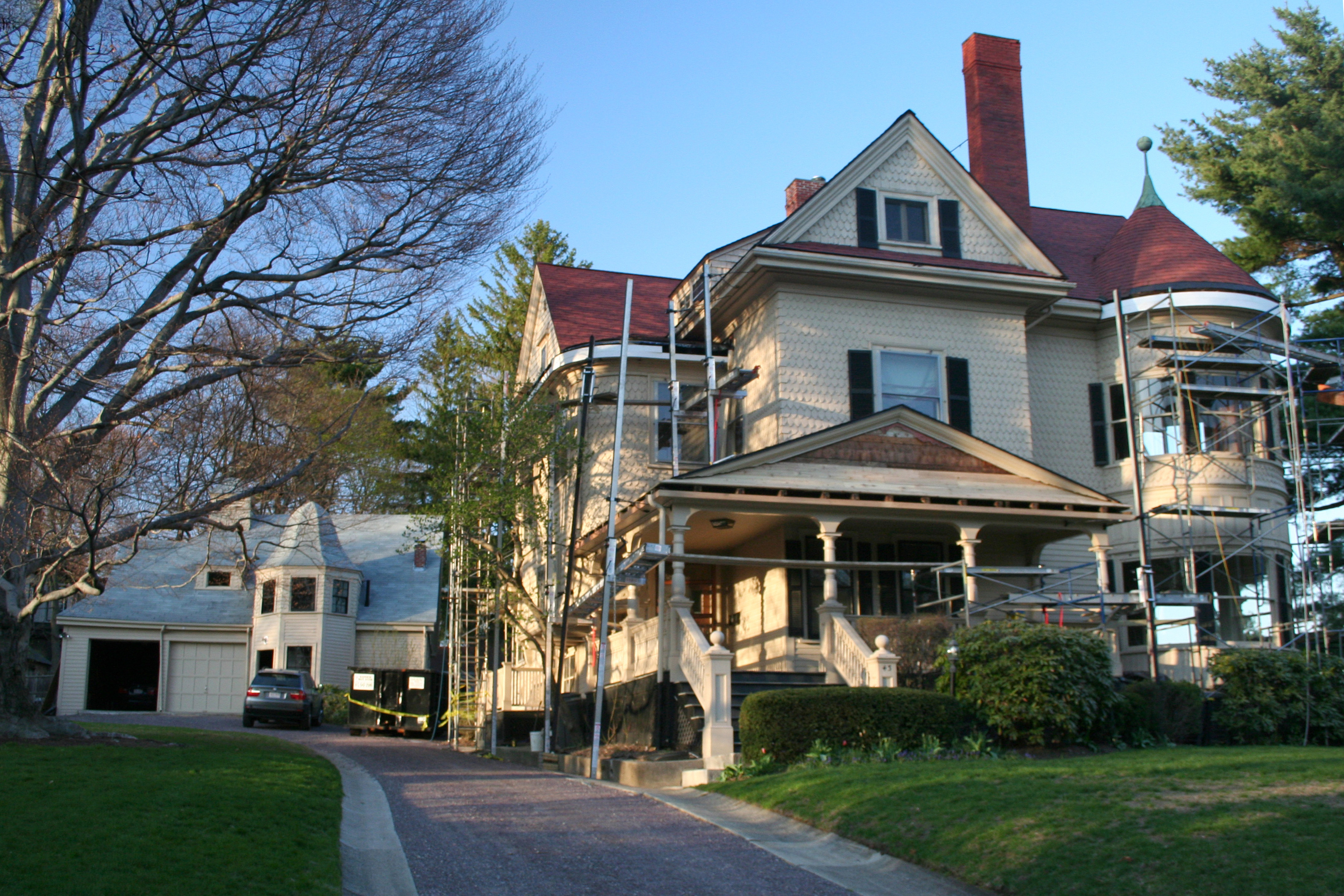
- John Souther House

- Location within Massachusetts Location within the United States
- Location: 43 Fairmont St., Newton, Massachusetts
- Coordinates: 42°20′59″N 71°11′24″W
- Built: 1883
- Architectural style: Queen Anne
- MPS: Newton MRA
- NRHP reference No.: 86001883
- Added to NRHP: September 04, 1986

The John Souther House is a historic house at 43 Fairmont Street in Newton, Massachusetts. The 2 1/2-story wood-frame house was built c. 1883 and is a well-preserved high style Queen Anne Victorian house. Its basically rectangular shape is rendered distinctive by varied size and placement of gable dormers, projecting sections, a turret, and rounded wall sections. Decoratively cut shingles are used to add texture to wall surfaces, the porch is ornately decorated. The property includes a period carriage house.

The house was listed on the National Register of Historic Places in 1986.

== See also ==
- National Register of Historic Places listings in Newton, Massachusetts
