= Joseph L. Stone House =

Historic house in Massachusetts, United States

- U.S. National Register of Historic Places
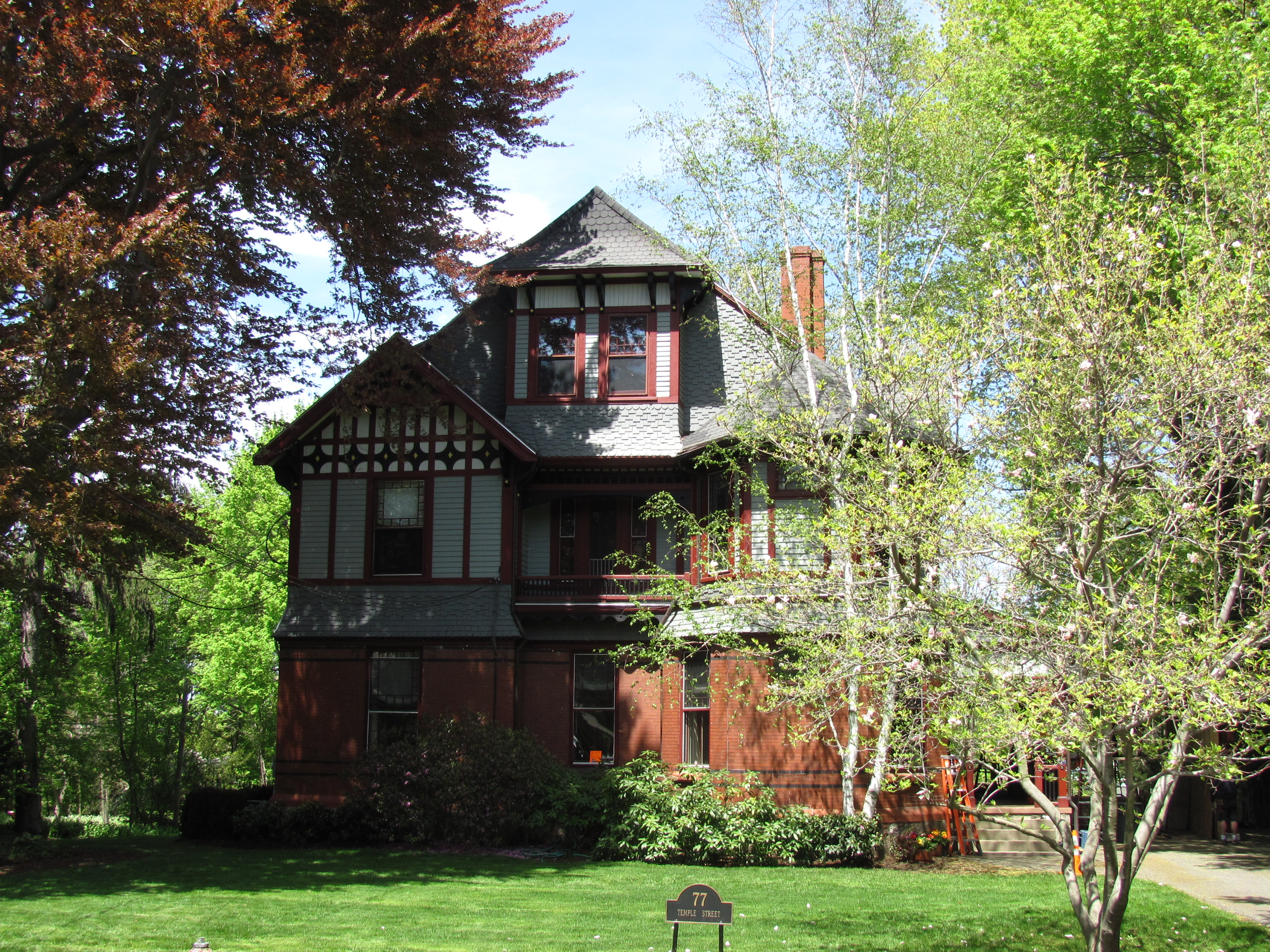
- Joseph L Stone House

- Location within Massachusetts Location within the United States
- Location: 77–85 Temple St., Newton, Massachusetts
- Coordinates: 42°20′39″N 71°13′47″W
- Built: 1881
- Architectural style: Queen Anne
- MPS: Newton MRA
- NRHP reference No.: 86001889
- Added to NRHP: September 04, 1986

The Joseph L. Stone House is a historic house and carriage barn at 77 and 85 Temple Street in Newton, Massachusetts. The 2 1/2-story house, now at 77 Temple Street, has a brick first floor and wood frame upper floors, with a roughly three-part facade. On the left is a projecting section with a gabled roof, and on the right is a rounded two story tower section topped with an octagonal roof. In between is a recessed porch on the second floor, with a projecting gabled dormer above. The walls are sheathed in decorative shingle work, and the porch and porte-cochere are elaborately decorated. The carriage barn, now converted to a residence at 85 Temple, is of similar styling. The house and carriage barn were built in 1881 by Joseph L. Stone, a banker.

The buildings were listed on the National Register of Historic Places in 1986.

== See also ==
- National Register of Historic Places listings in Newton, Massachusetts
