= S. Curtis Smith House =

Historic house in Massachusetts, United States

- Curtis S. Smith House
- U.S. National Register of Historic Places
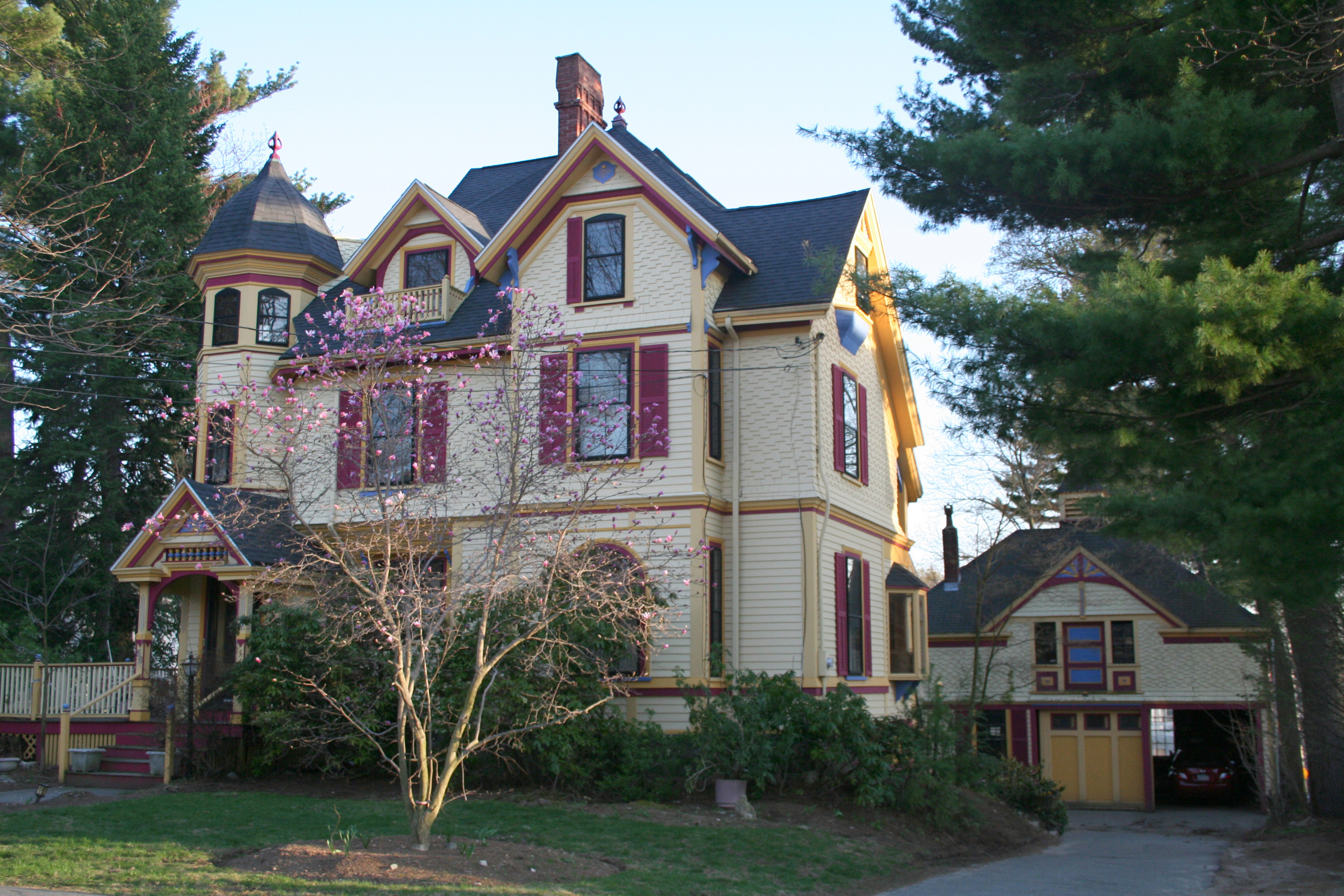

- Location within Massachusetts Location within the United States
- Location: 56 Fairmont Ave., Newton, Massachusetts
- Coordinates: 42°20′58″N 71°11′27″W
- Built: 1883
- Architectural style: Queen Anne
- MPS: Newton MRA
- NRHP reference No.: 86001881
- Added to NRHP: September 04, 1986

The S. Curtis Smith House is a historic house at 56 Fairmont Avenue in Newton, Massachusetts. The 2 1/2-story wood-frame house was built c. 1883, and is one of Newton's finest Queen Anne Victorian houses. It exhibits a full range of that style's features, including asymmetrical massing with numerous and varied gables, a tower with an octagonal arched roof, bands of different types of shingling, and an ornately decorated front portico. The house was built for S. Curtis Smith, a schoolteacher.

The house was listed on the National Register of Historic Places in 1986 as the "Curtis S. Smith House".

== See also ==
- National Register of Historic Places listings in Newton, Massachusetts
