= Ware Paper Mill =

- U.S. National Register of Historic Places
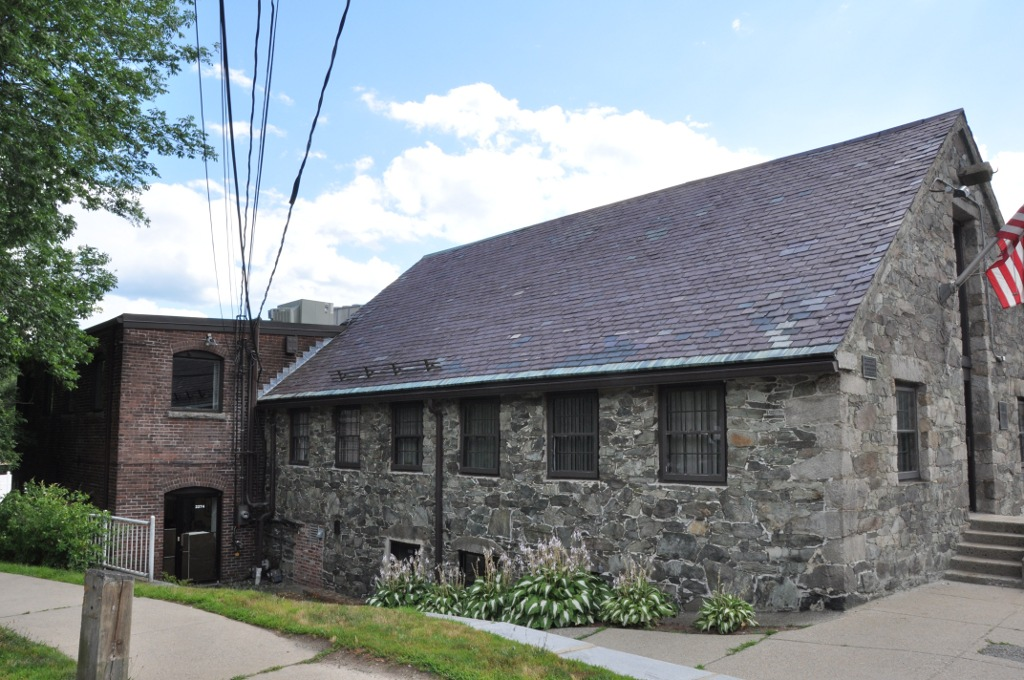

- Location within Massachusetts Location within the United States
- Location: 2276 Washington St., Newton, Massachusetts
- Coordinates: 42°19′33″N 71°15′19″W
- Built: 1790
- NRHP reference No.: 78000458
- Added to NRHP: May 22, 1978

The Ware Paper Mill is a historic mill building at 2276 Washington Street in Newton, Massachusetts. Built in 1790, it is a remnant of the first paper mill to be built on the banks of the Charles River. The 1 1/2-story stone building was built by John Ware, a veteran of the American Revolutionary War, and was used for paper production until 1938. A brick addition was added to the rear of the building in the 19th century; its interior was effectively stripped in the 1973.

The building was listed on the National Register of Historic Places in 1978.

== See also ==
- National Register of Historic Places listings in Newton, Massachusetts
