= Samuel Farquhar House =

Historic house in Massachusetts, United States

- U.S. National Register of Historic Places
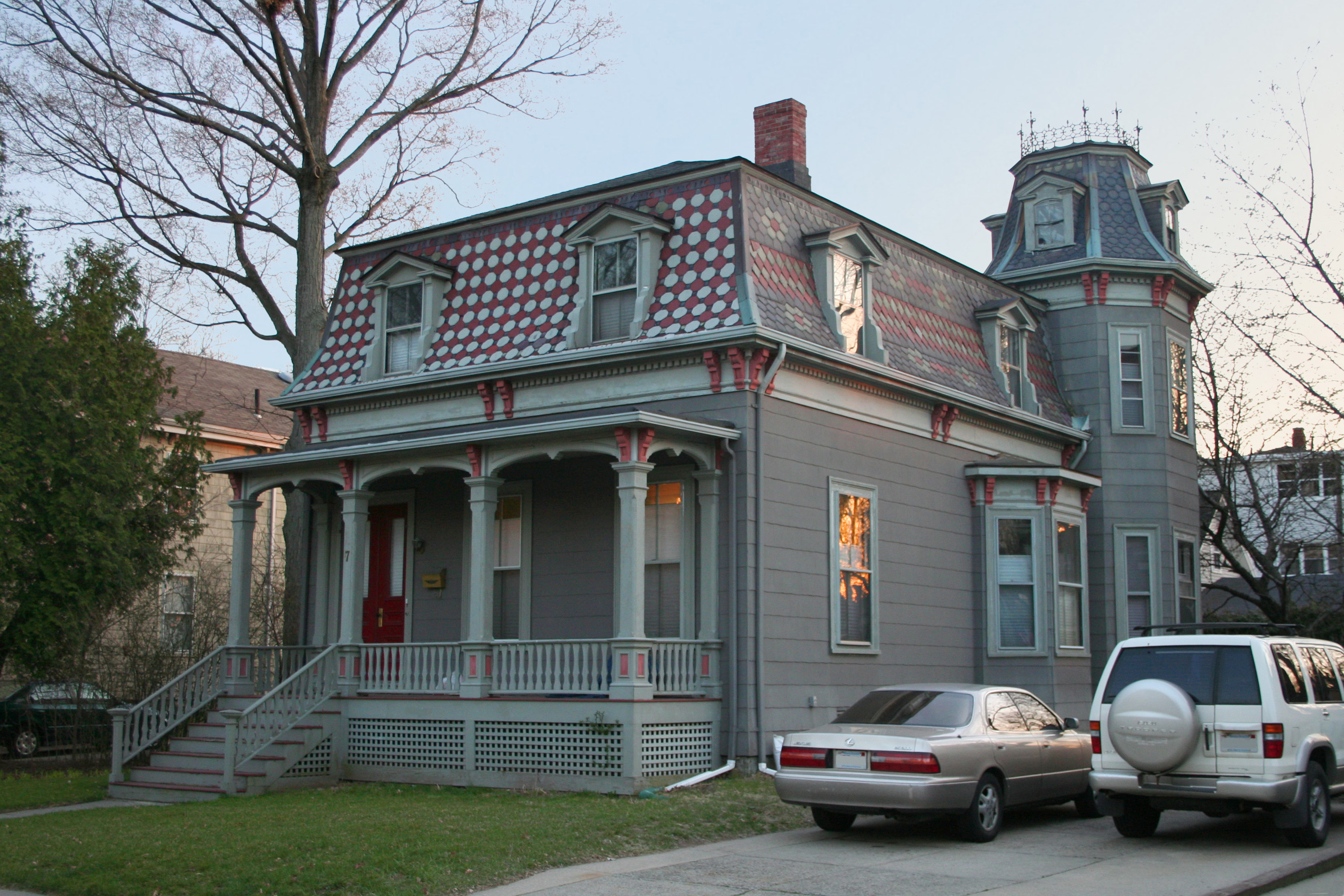
- Samuel Farquhar House

- Location within Massachusetts Location within the United States
- Location: 7 Channing Street, Newton, Massachusetts
- Coordinates: 41°52′18″N 71°10′20″W
- Built: 1868
- Architect: Samuel Farquhar
- Architectural style: Second Empire
- MPS: Newton MRA
- NRHP reference No.: 86001798
- Added to NRHP: September 4, 1986

The Samuel Farquhar House is an historic Second Empire style building located in the village of Newton Corner in Newton, Massachusetts. The 1 1/2-story wood-frame house was built c. 1868. Its mansard roof is shingled in slate tiles of varying colors and shapes, arranged in decorative patterns. It has well-preserved decorative porch woodwork, and an octagonal 2 1/2-story turret at one corner. The roof lines are lined with dentil moulding with paired brackets. It is one of the finest Second Empire houses in the city.

On September 4, 1986, it was added to the National Register of Historic Places.

== See also ==
- National Register of Historic Places listings in Newton, Massachusetts
