= Bartlett–Hawkes Farm =

- U.S. National Register of Historic Places
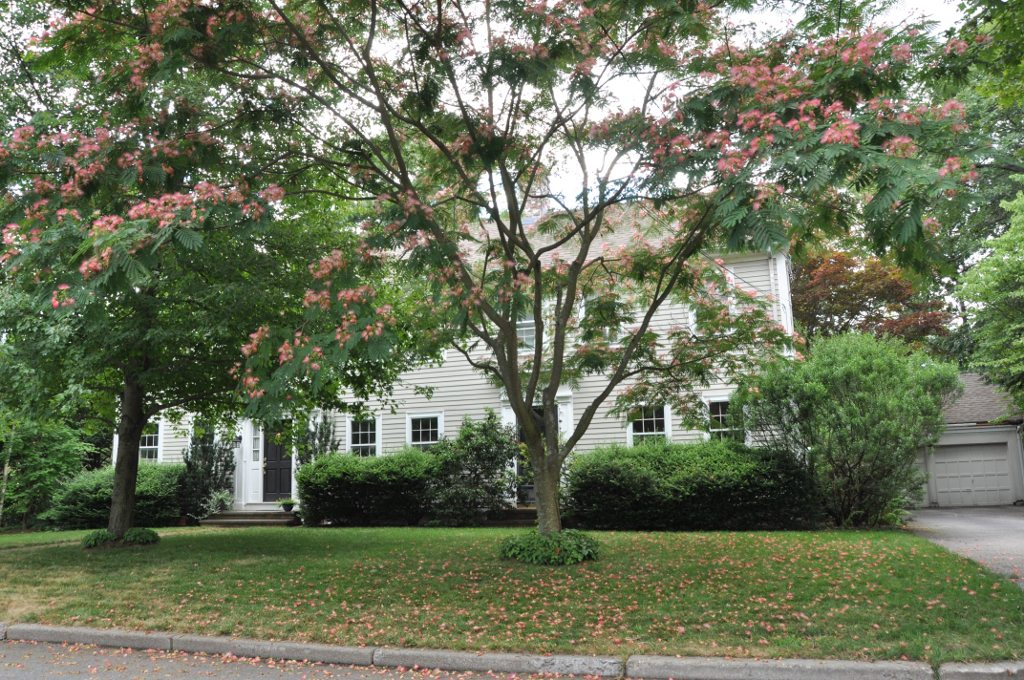

- Location within Massachusetts Location within the United States
- Location: 15 Winnetaska Road, Waban; Newton, Massachusetts
- Coordinates: 42°19′41.05″N 71°14′22.47″W
- Area: less than one acre
- Built: 1736
- Architectural style: Federal
- MPS: Newton MRA
- NRHP reference No.: 86001770
- Added to NRHP: September 4, 1986

The Bartlett–Hawkes Farm is a historic house at 15 Winnetaska Road, in the Waban village of Newton, Massachusetts. With its oldest portion dating to about 1736, it is the oldest surviving building in Waban. Enlarged several times, it was moved to its present location from Beacon Street in 1915. It was listed in the National Register of Historic Places on September 4, 1986.

== Description and history ==
The Barlett–Hawkes Farm is located in a residential area west of the center of Waban village, on the west side of Winnetaska Road at its junction with Quidnic Road. It is a 2 1/2-story wood-frame structure, eight bays wide, with a side-gable roof and clapboard siding. The rear roof extends down to the first floor, giving the house a saltbox profile. There are two entrances on the main facade, each two bays in from a side. Both have Federal period surrounds with pilasters and a corniced entablature; the one on the left also has half-length sidelight windows.

The oldest portion of the house is believed to be the southernmost three bays, which were built as a "half house" about 1736 by Ebenezer Bartlett, who owned about 100 acres (40 ha) of land. Bartlett and his wife Katie raised seventeen children in the house, expanding it to five bays. Bartlett's son Elisha increased the farm to 200 acres (81 ha), and served in the local militia during the American Revolutionary War. His son Peregrine sold the farm to George Hawkes, another local farmer, in the mid-19th century. Later owners further extended the building in the early 20th century, added bays on the north side and adding the saltbox shed to the rear. Originally facing nearby Beacon Street, the house was moved about 200 feet (61 m) to its present location in 1915.

== See also ==
- National Register of Historic Places listings in Newton, Massachusetts
