= House at 41 Middlesex Road =

Historic house in Massachusetts, United States

- U.S. National Register of Historic Places
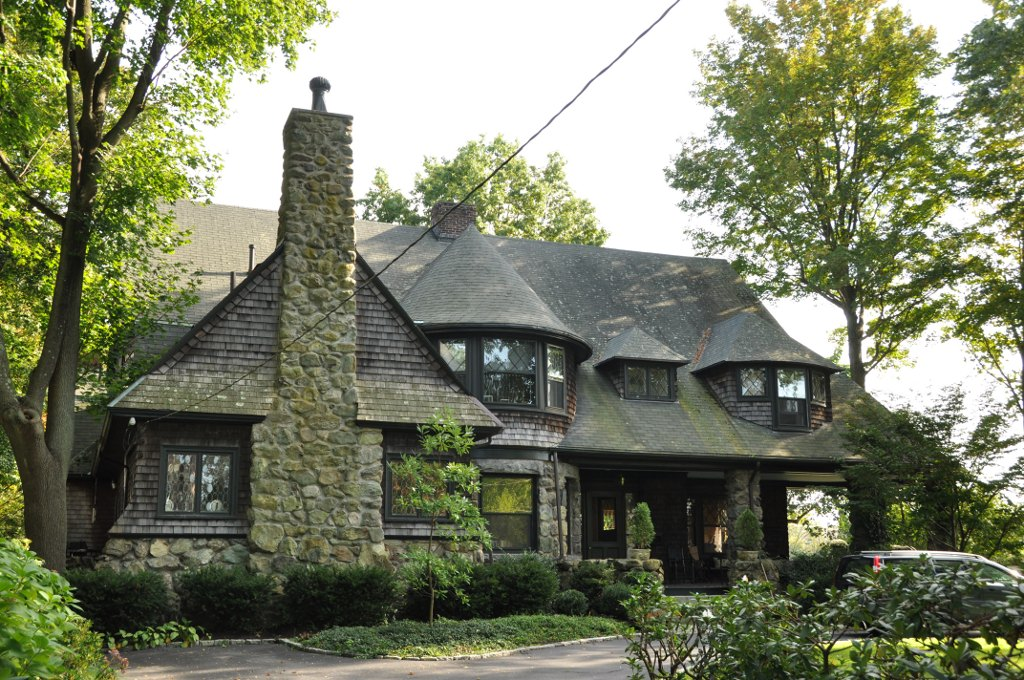

- Location within Massachusetts Location within the United States
- Location: 41 Middlesex Rd., Newton, Massachusetts
- Coordinates: 42°19′33″N 71°9′50″W
- Built: 1894
- Architect: Chapman & Frazer
- Architectural style: Shingle Style
- MPS: Newton MRA
- NRHP reference No.: 86001830
- Added to NRHP: September 04, 1986

The House at 41 Middlesex Road in the Chestnut Hill section of Newton, Massachusetts, USA, is a well-preserved local example of Shingle style architecture. The 2 1/2-story stone-and-wood house was built in 1894 by William R. Dupee, who lived on a nearby estate. The house was designed by Boston architect Horace Frazer, of Chapman & Frazer, and initially occupied by Dr. Frederick William Payne. The ground floor has significant fieldstone elements, and the upper levels are clad in dark brown shingles. Some of the windows have diamond-paned muntins, a late Victorian touch. The house was expanded in the 1930s, with a 1 1/2-story addition and garage.

The house was listed on the National Register of Historic Places in 1986.

== See also ==
- National Register of Historic Places listings in Newton, Massachusetts
