= House at 115–117 Jewett Street =

Historic house in Massachusetts, United States

- U.S. National Register of Historic Places
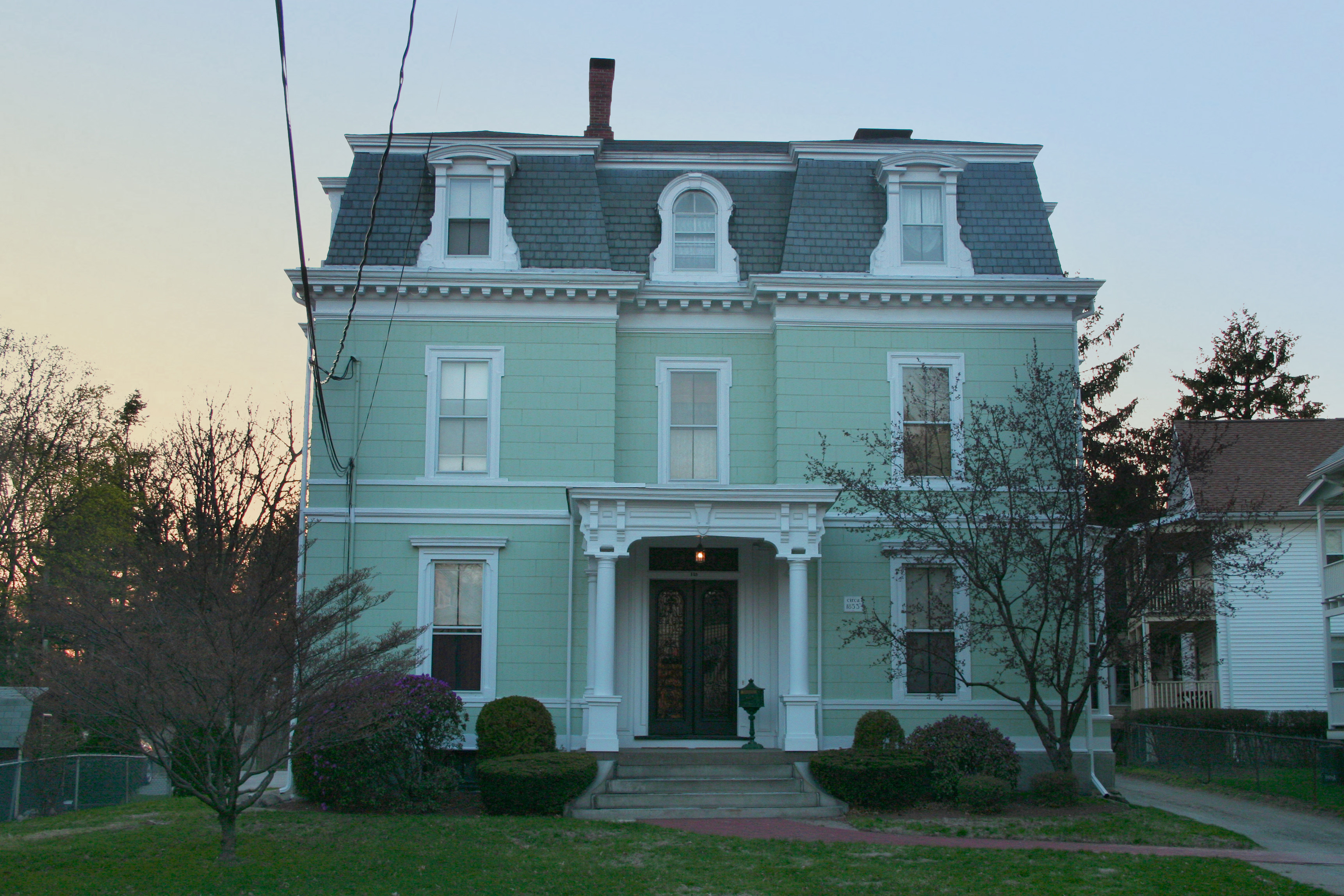

- Location within Massachusetts Location within the United States
- Location: 115–117 Jewett St., Newton, Massachusetts
- Coordinates: 42°21′25″N 71°11′32″W
- Built: 1865
- Architectural style: Second Empire, Mansard
- MPS: Newton MRA
- NRHP reference No.: 86001816
- Added to NRHP: September 4, 1986

The house at 115–117 Jewett Street, in the Newton Corner village of Newton, Massachusetts, is an example of the academic style of Second Empire design. The 2 1/2-story wood-frame house was built in the 1860s, and features a projecting entry portico, a distinctive feature of the academic variant, and decorated dormers with segmented-arch or round-arch tops. In addition to other well-preserved period details, the property also includes a mansard-roofed carriage house with cupola.

The house was listed on the National Register of Historic Places in 1986.

== See also ==
- National Register of Historic Places listings in Newton, Massachusetts
