= Arthur F. Luke House =

Historic house in Massachusetts, United States

- U.S. National Register of Historic Places
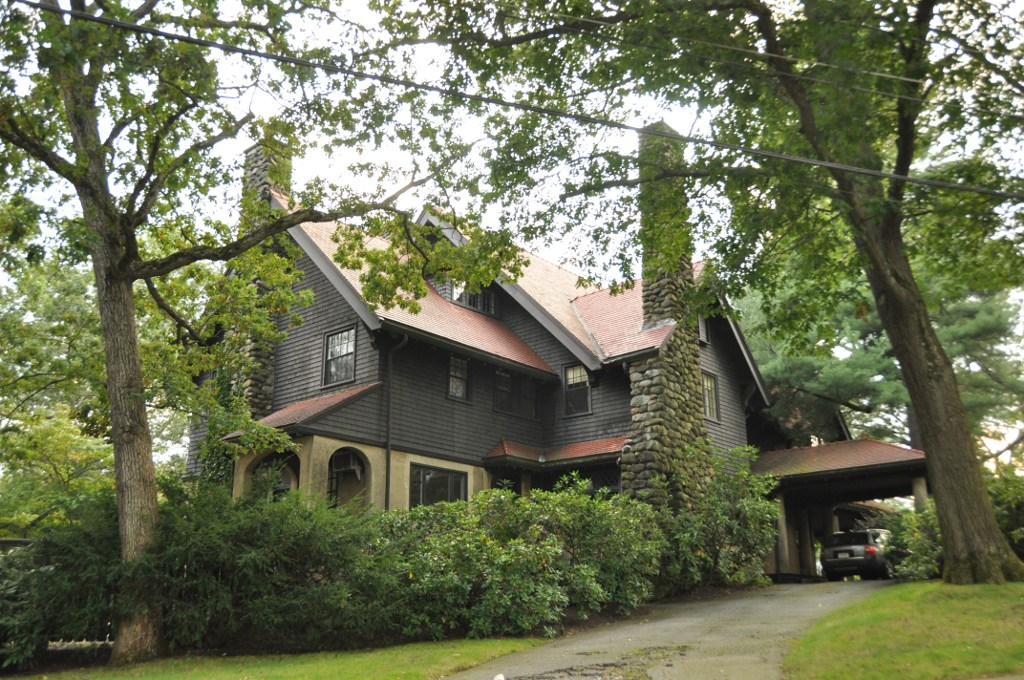

- Location within Massachusetts Location within the United States
- Location: 221 Prince St., Newton, Massachusetts
- Coordinates: 42°20′21″N 71°13′25″W
- Built: 1909
- Architectural style: Bungalow/Craftsman
- MPS: Newton MRA
- NRHP reference No.: 90000042
- Added to NRHP: February 16, 1990

Arthur F. Luke House is a historic house at 221 Prince Street in Newton, Massachusetts. The house, which is 2 1/2 stories high, is built in a rustic Craftsman style. It is topped by a hip roof with three cross gables across the facade. It has two fieldstone chimneys which provide a rustic effect. A verandah extends from the entry to the right side of the house, ending up in a pergola-type arbor. The house was built in 1909 and added to the National Register of Historic Places in 1990.

Arthur F. Luke was senior manager of the National Tube Company and the son of James Luke (October 22, 1823 – December 14, 1899).

== See also ==
- National Register of Historic Places listings in Newton, Massachusetts
