= Charles Riley House =

Historic house in Massachusetts, United States

- U.S. National Register of Historic Places
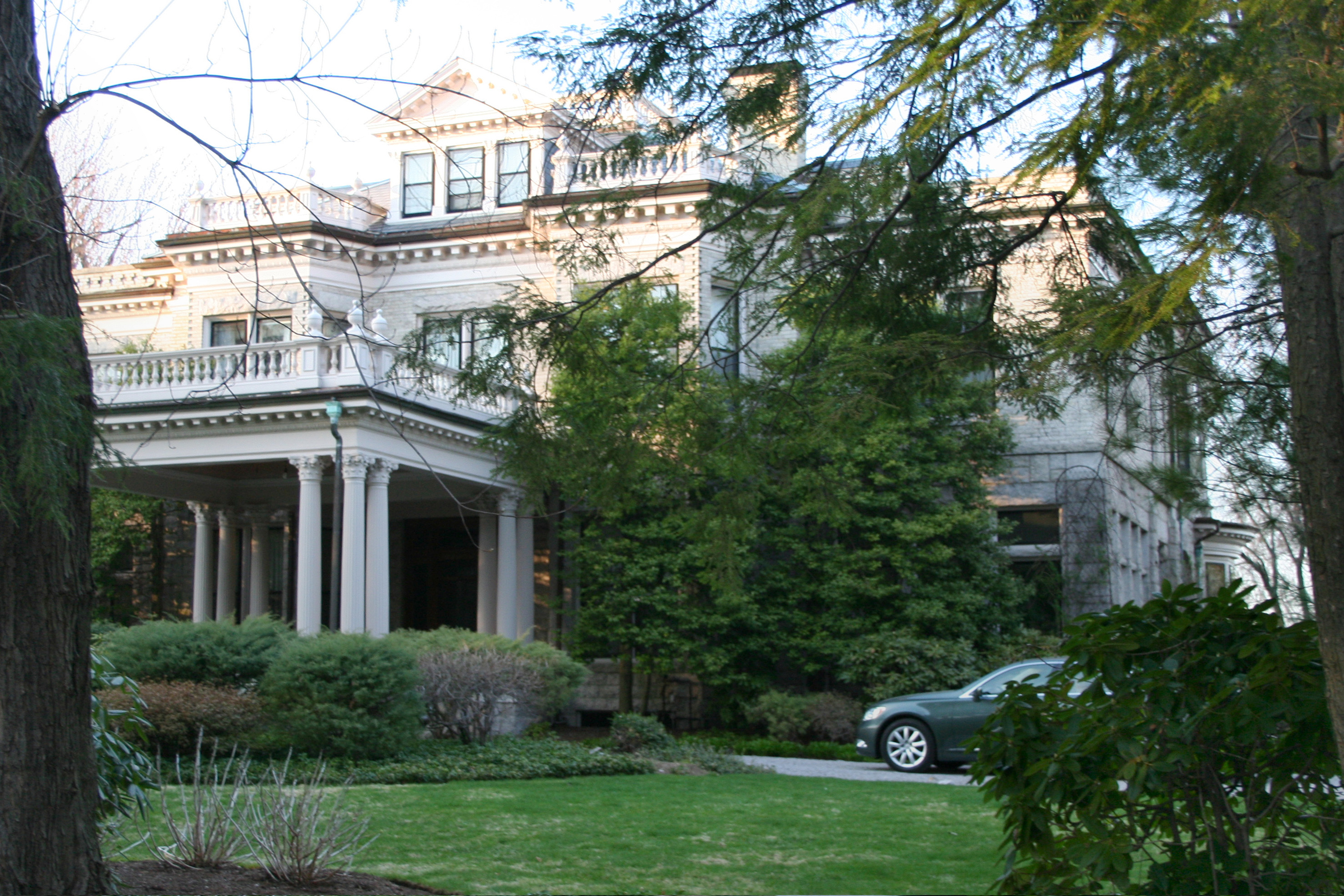

- Location within Massachusetts Location within the United States
- Location: 93 Bellevue Street, Newton, Massachusetts
- Coordinates: 42°21′6″N 71°11′27″W
- Built: 1881
- Architectural style: Classical Revival
- MPS: Newton MRA
- NRHP reference No.: 86001872
- Added to NRHP: September 4, 1986

The Charles Riley House is a historic house in Newton, Massachusetts. This large neo-Classical estate house started out as a more modest wood-frame structure built in the 1870s by Boston businessman Job Turner. In c. 1888 Charles Riley, a manufacturer of cotton processing machinery, greatly expanded the house, giving it the present neo-Classical styling, and finishing the exterior in brick and stone.

The house was listed on the National Register of Historic Places in 1986.

== See also ==
- National Register of Historic Places listings in Newton, Massachusetts
