= House at 152 Suffolk Road =

Historic house in Massachusetts, United States

- U.S. National Register of Historic Places
- U.S. Historic district – Contributing property
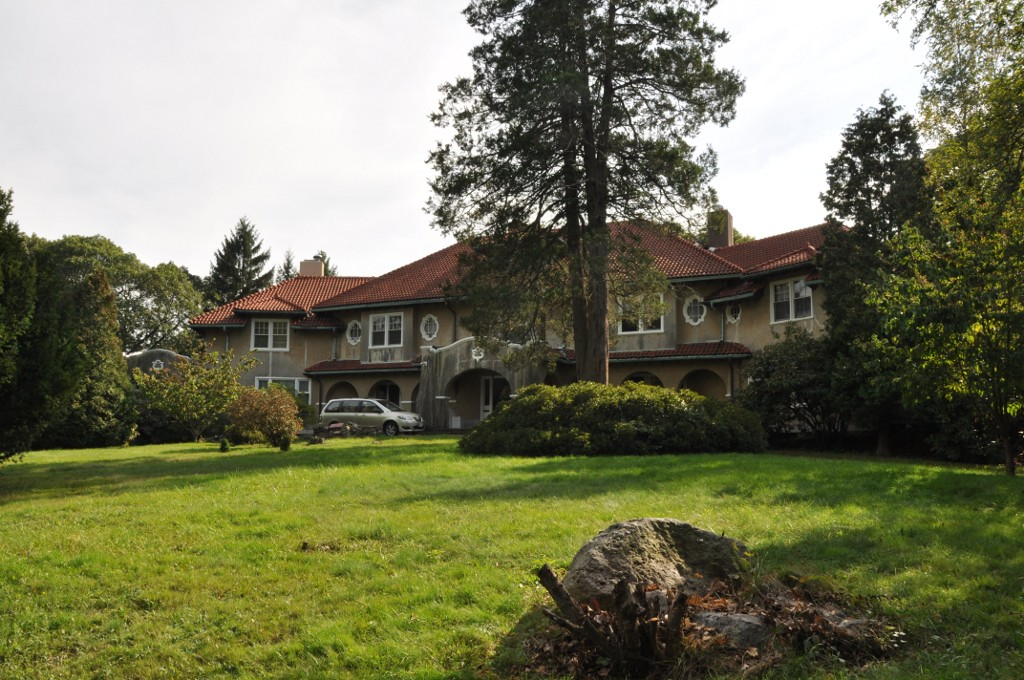

- Location within Massachusetts Location within the United States
- Location: 152 Suffolk Rd., Newton, Massachusetts
- Coordinates: 42°19′43″N 71°10′21″W
- Area: 1.6 acres (0.65 ha)
- Built: 1900
- Architectural style: Colonial Revival
- Part of: Old Chestnut Hill Historic District (ID90000007)
- MPS: Newton MRA
- NRHP reference No.: 86001818

Significant dates
- Added to NRHP: September 04, 1986
- Designated CP: February 16, 1990

The House at 152 Suffolk Road in the Chestnut Hill area of Newton, Massachusetts is a rare local example of the Spanish Mediterranean style of Colonial Revival architecture. The house, built in 1904, is set apart from more typical Colonial Revival structures by its use of ceramic tile as roofing, stucco walls, and a Mediterranean-style loggia.

The house was listed on the National Register of Historic Places in 1986, and included in an expansion of the Old Chestnut Hill Historic District in 1990.

== See also ==
- National Register of Historic Places listings in Newton, Massachusetts
