= Simpson House (Newton, Massachusetts) =

Historic house in Massachusetts, United States

- U.S. National Register of Historic Places
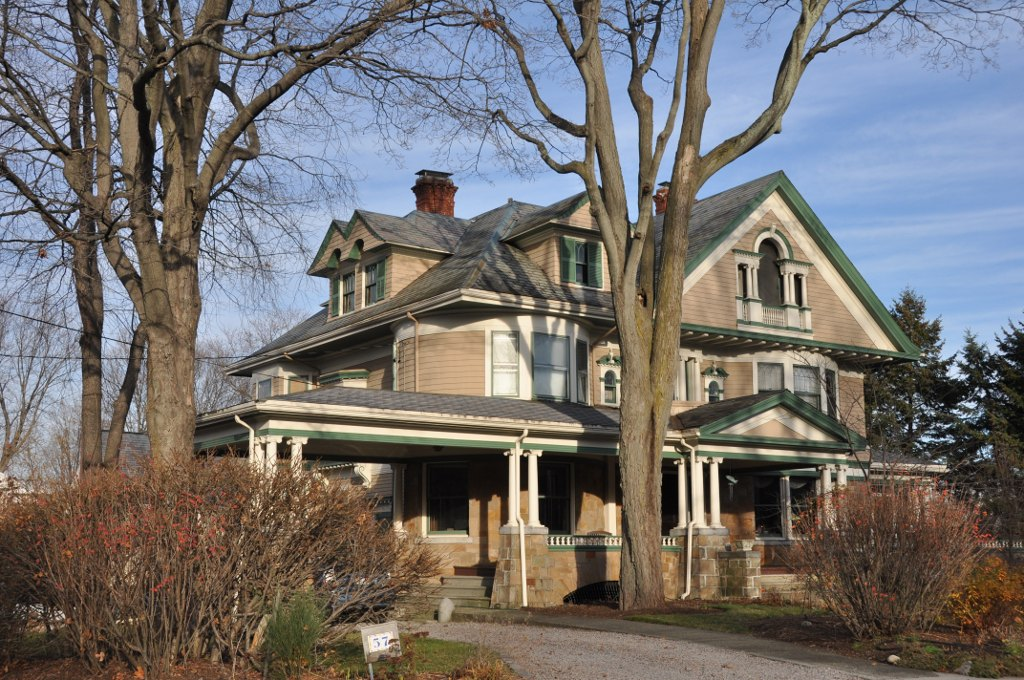

- Location within Massachusetts Location within the United States
- Location: 57 Hunnewell Ave., Newton, Massachusetts
- Coordinates: 42°21′21″N 71°10′30″W
- Built: 1897
- Architectural style: Colonial Revival, Queen Anne
- MPS: Newton MRA
- NRHP reference No.: 86001880
- Added to NRHP: September 04, 1986

The Simpson House is a historic house at 57 Hunnewell Avenue in Newton, Massachusetts. The 2 1/2-story wood-frame house was built in the late 1890s, and is an excellent local example of a well-preserved Queen Anne Victorian with some Colonial Revival features. It has roughly rectangular massing, but is visually diverse, with a number of gables and projections. A single story porch across the front extends over the drive to form a porte cochere, and rests on fieldstone piers with Tuscan columns. The stairs to the entry are called out by a triangular pediment, above which is a Palladian window with flanking columns. Joseph Simpson, its first owner, was a principal in the Simpson Brothers paving company.

The house was listed on the National Register of Historic Places in 1986.

== See also ==
- National Register of Historic Places listings in Newton, Massachusetts
