= Frank B. Hopewell House =

Historic house in Massachusetts, United States

- U.S. National Register of Historic Places
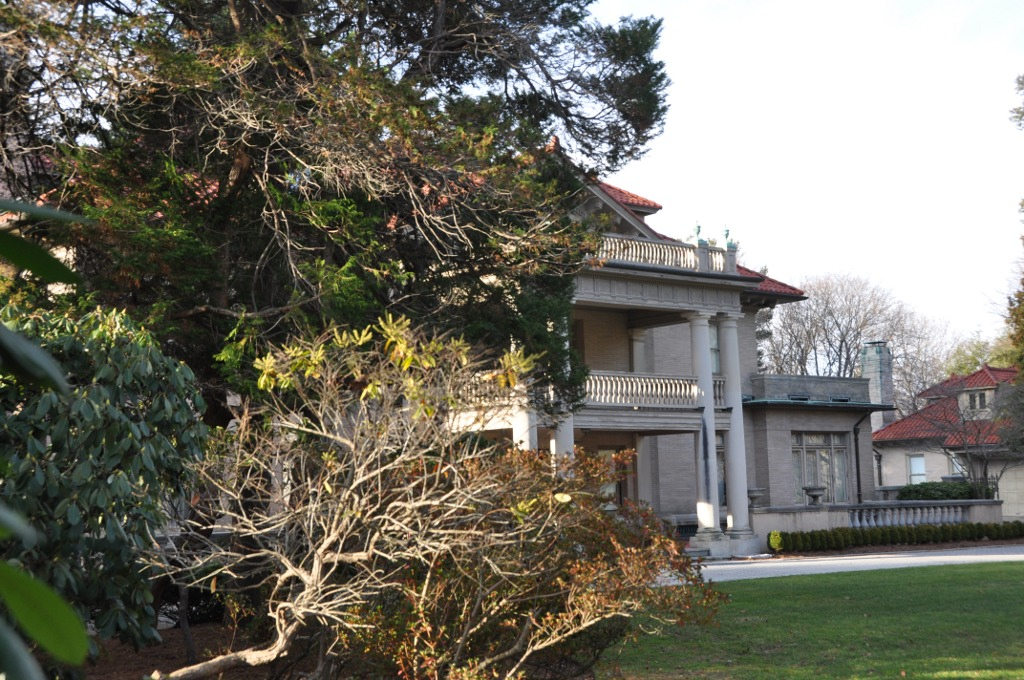

- Location within Massachusetts Location within the United States
- Location: 301 Waverley Ave., Newton, Massachusetts
- Coordinates: 42°20′45″N 71°10′56″W
- Built: 1919
- Architect: Sidbottom, George H.
- Architectural style: Classical Revival
- MPS: Newton MRA
- NRHP reference No.: 90000034
- Added to NRHP: February 16, 1990

The Frank B. Hopewell House is a historic house at 301 Waverley Avenue in Newton, Massachusetts. The large 3 1/2-story brick building was designed by Boston architect George H Sidebottom and built in 1919. It is the most intact and best preserved of several large early 20th century Colonial Revival estate houses in the city. Frank Hopewell, for whom it was built, worked for a manufacturing sales firm, and was treasurer and director of the Sanford Mills.

The house was listed on the National Register of Historic Places in 1990.

The house was purchased by Boston based hedge fund manager and emerging markets investor Ashish Chugh for $7.25mil in September, 2022. Chugh is head of Global Emerging Market Equities at Loomis, Sayles & Company. The house was previously owned by Ahmed Zaki Yamani, former Saudi Arabian Minister of Petroleum and Mineral Resources and former head of OPEC (Organization of the Petroleum Exporting Countries).

== See also ==
- National Register of Historic Places listings in Newton, Massachusetts
