= House at 81–83 Gardner Street =

Historic house in Massachusetts, United States

- U.S. National Register of Historic Places
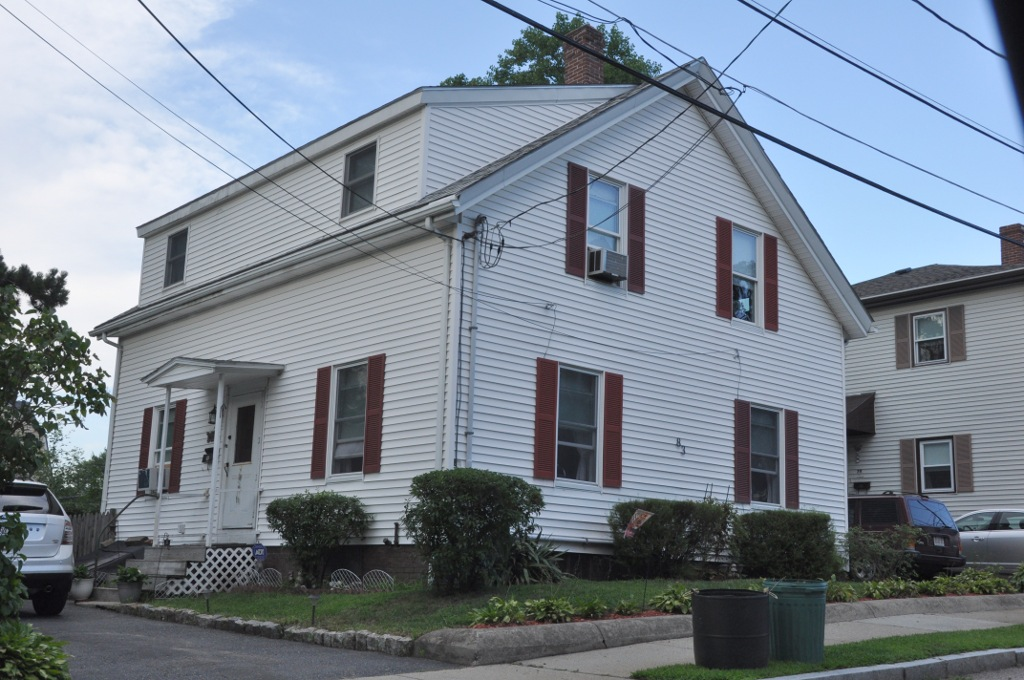

- Location within Massachusetts Location within the United States
- Location: 81–83 Gardner St., Newton, Massachusetts
- Coordinates: 42°21′35″N 71°11′34″W
- Built: 1850
- MPS: Newton MRA
- NRHP reference No.: 86001836
- Added to NRHP: September 4, 1986

The house at 81–83 Gardner Street is a historic house in the Newton Corner village of Newton, Massachusetts. The 1 1/2-story duplex is remarkably well-preserved example of a vernacular worker's cottage, a style not often found in Newton but somewhat common in Newton Corner. It has a side-gable roof and asymmetrically placed chimneys. The house has a side (originally doubled) entry, and lacks any significant external architectural ornamentation.

The house was listed on the National Register of Historic Places in 1986.

== See also ==
- National Register of Historic Places listings in Newton, Massachusetts
