= H. P. Page House =

Historic house in Massachusetts, United States

- U.S. National Register of Historic Places
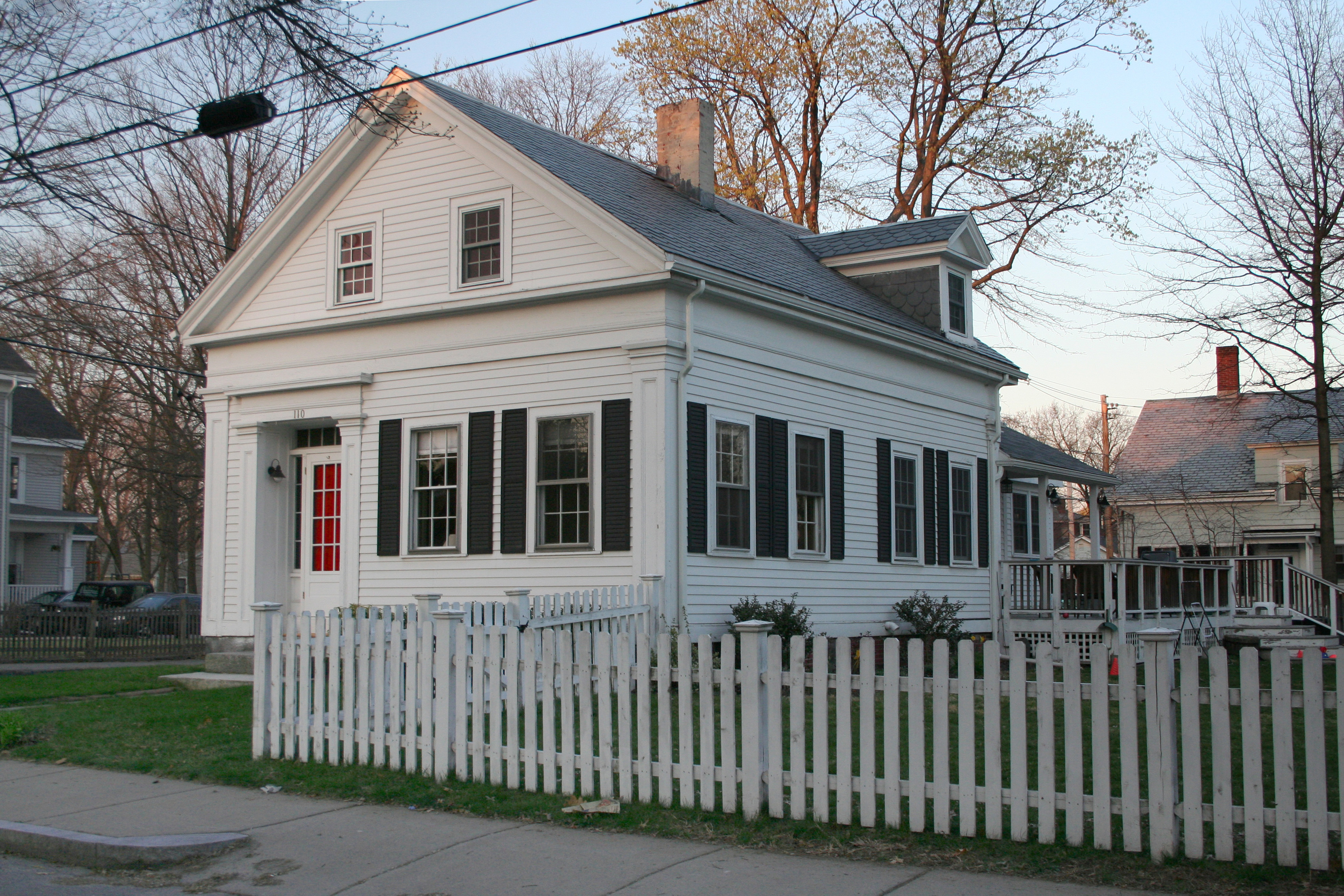

- Location within Massachusetts Location within the United States
- Location: 110 Jewett Street, Newton, Massachusetts
- Coordinates: 42°21′25″N 71°11′30″W
- Built: 1850
- Architectural style: Greek Revival
- MPS: Newton MRA
- NRHP reference No.: 86001860
- Added to NRHP: September 4, 1986

The H. P. Page House is a historic house located in Newton, Massachusetts.

== Description and history ==
The 1 1/2-story wood-frame house was built c. 1850, and is a detailed example of a Greek Revival workers' cottage. The gable end is pedimented, and an entablature wraps around the house, supported by corner pilasters. The main entrance is flanked by sidelight windows and panelled pilasters, and topped by antransom window and entablature.

The house was listed on the National Register of Historic Places on September 4, 1986.

== See also ==
- National Register of Historic Places listings in Newton, Massachusetts
