= House at 47 Sargent Street =

Historic house in Massachusetts, United States

- U.S. National Register of Historic Places
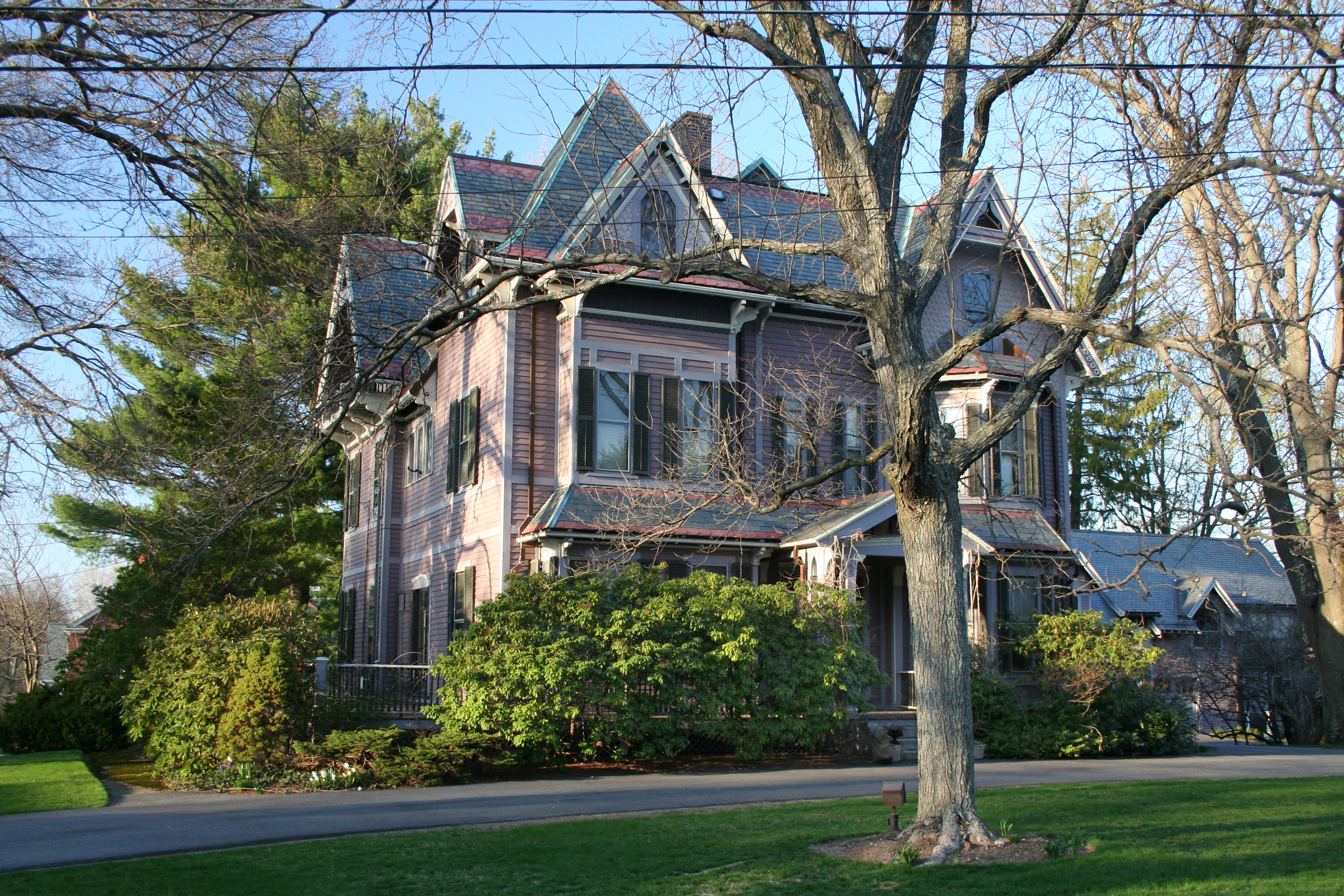

- Location within Massachusetts Location within the United States
- Location: 47 Sargent St., Newton, Massachusetts
- Coordinates: 42°20′50″N 71°11′1″W
- Built: 1879
- Architectural style: Stick/Eastlake
- MPS: Newton MRA
- NRHP reference No.: 86001831
- Added to NRHP: September 04, 1986

The House at 47 Sargent Street in Newton, Massachusetts, is one of the city's finest Stick style houses. The 2 1/2-story wood-frame house was built in 1879. It has irregular, asymmetrical massing, with a gables with a variety of shapes and decorations adding complexity to its roof line. Patterned shingles are used to vary the wall decoration, and Stick style decoration is liberally applied. The main entrance, flanked by leaded sidelight windows, is set under a porch with patterned red and gray slate roof, and a projecting gabled section.

The house was listed on the National Register of Historic Places in 1986.

== See also ==
- National Register of Historic Places listings in Newton, Massachusetts
