= George W. Eddy House =

Historic house in Massachusetts, United States

- U.S. National Register of Historic Places
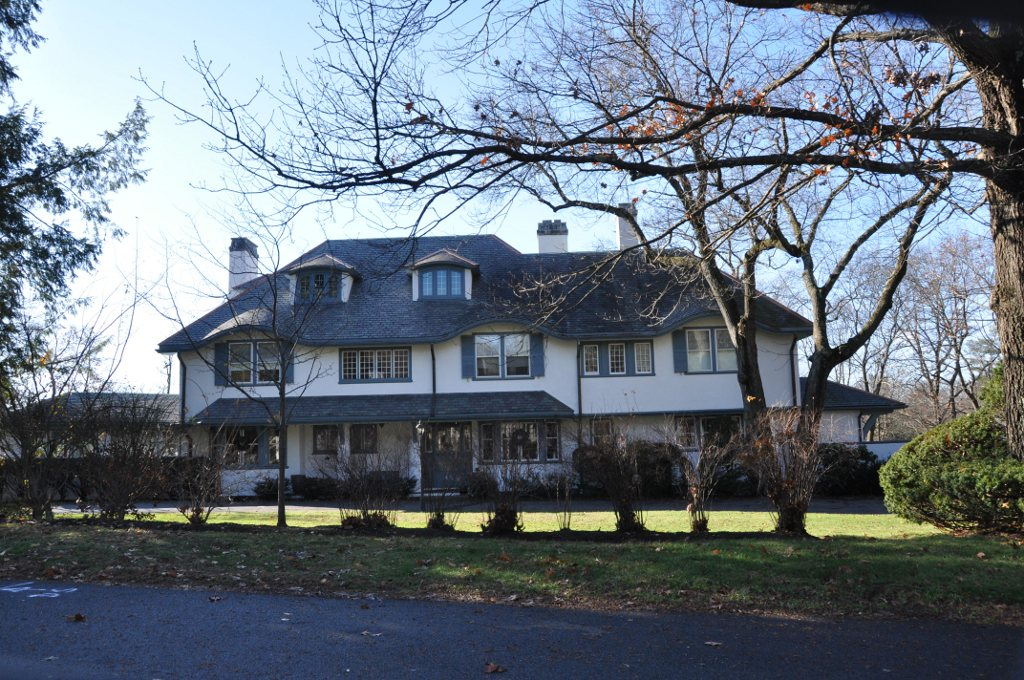

- Location within Massachusetts Location within the United States
- Location: 85 Bigelow Rd., Newton, Massachusetts
- Coordinates: 42°20′26″N 71°13′2″W
- Built: 1913
- Architect: Chapman & Frazer
- Architectural style: Bungalow/Craftsman
- MPS: Newton MRA
- NRHP reference No.: 90000038
- Added to NRHP: February 16, 1990

The George W. Eddy House is a historic house at 85 Bigelow Road in Newton, Massachusetts. The 2 1/2-story stucco-clad house was built in 1913 for George W. Eddy, a merchant, to a design by the noted area firm of Chapman & Frazer. It is Newton's finest example of Craftsman styling; its slate hip roof includes curved sections above paired windows, a detail that is repeated in dormers that pierce the roof. A shed-style roof along a portion of the main facade shelters a recessed main entrance, whose flanking sidelight windows contain leaded glass.

The house was listed on the National Register of Historic Places in 1990.

== See also ==
- National Register of Historic Places listings in Newton, Massachusetts
