= Capt. Edward Fuller Farm =

- U.S. National Register of Historic Places
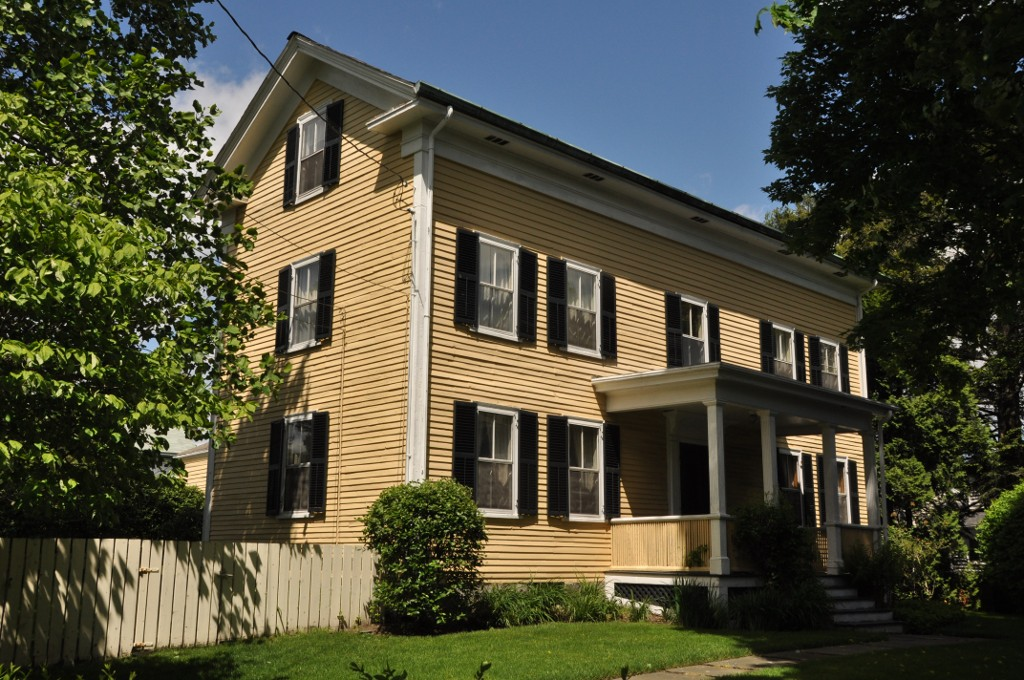
- 59 North St.

- Location within Massachusetts Location within the United States
- Location: 59–71 North St., Newton, Massachusetts
- Coordinates: 42°21′41″N 71°13′1″W
- Built: 1775
- Architectural style: Federal, English barn
- MPS: Newton MRA
- NRHP reference No.: 86001804
- Added to NRHP: September 04, 1986

The Capt. Edward Fuller Farm is a historic farmstead at 59-71 North Street in Newton, Massachusetts. The original farmhouse is at #59, and the barn, now converted to a house, is at #71. The house is estimated to have been built c. 1775, possibly using materials from an even older structure; the barn is estimated to have been built in 1800. The house was original 1 1/2 stories, and was raised to its present 2 1/2 in the 1840s. The barn was converted to residential use c. 1950. The house was probably built by Edward Fuller, whose great-grandfather was one of the first settlers of the area.

The properties were listed on the National Register of Historic Places in 1986.

== See also ==
- National Register of Historic Places listings in Newton, Massachusetts
