= Henry Gane House =

Historic house in Massachusetts, United States

- U.S. National Register of Historic Places
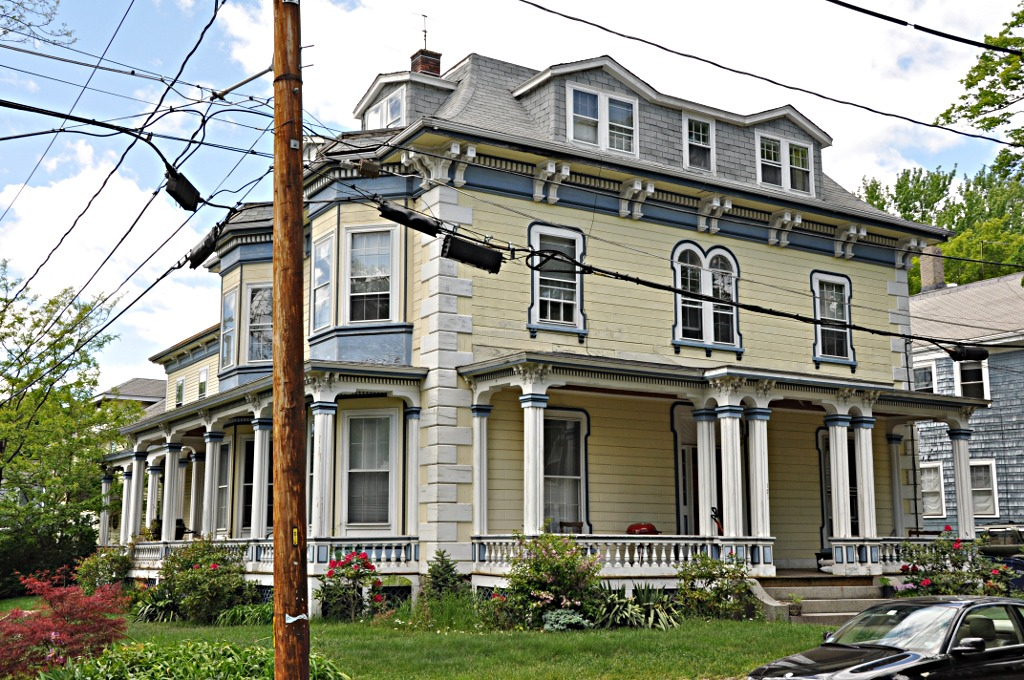

- Location within Massachusetts Location within the United States
- Location: 121 Adena Rd., Newton, Massachusetts
- Coordinates: 42°21′19″N 71°13′31″W
- Built: 1865
- Architectural style: Second Empire, Mansard
- MPS: Newton MRA
- NRHP reference No.: 86001806
- Added to NRHP: September 04, 1986

The Henry Gane House is a historic house at 121 Adena Road in Newton, Massachusetts. Built c. 1860s, the two-plus story wood-frame house is distinguished as one of Newton's finest Second Empire houses. Its eaves are lined with dentil moulding and paired brackets, its windows have elaborate hoods, and its porch, which wraps around two sides of the house, has elaborate woodwork detail. The house was built for Henry Gane, a successful Boston merchant, and originally stood on 16 acres (6.5 ha) of manicured grounds at the corner of Waltham and Derby Streets. The land was subdivided in 1897, after which adjacent Northgate Park was developed; the house was moved to its present location after World War I.

The house was listed on the National Register of Historic Places in 1986.

== See also ==
- National Register of Historic Places listings in Newton, Massachusetts
