= Thayer House (Newton, Massachusetts) =

Historic house in Massachusetts, United States

- U.S. National Register of Historic Places
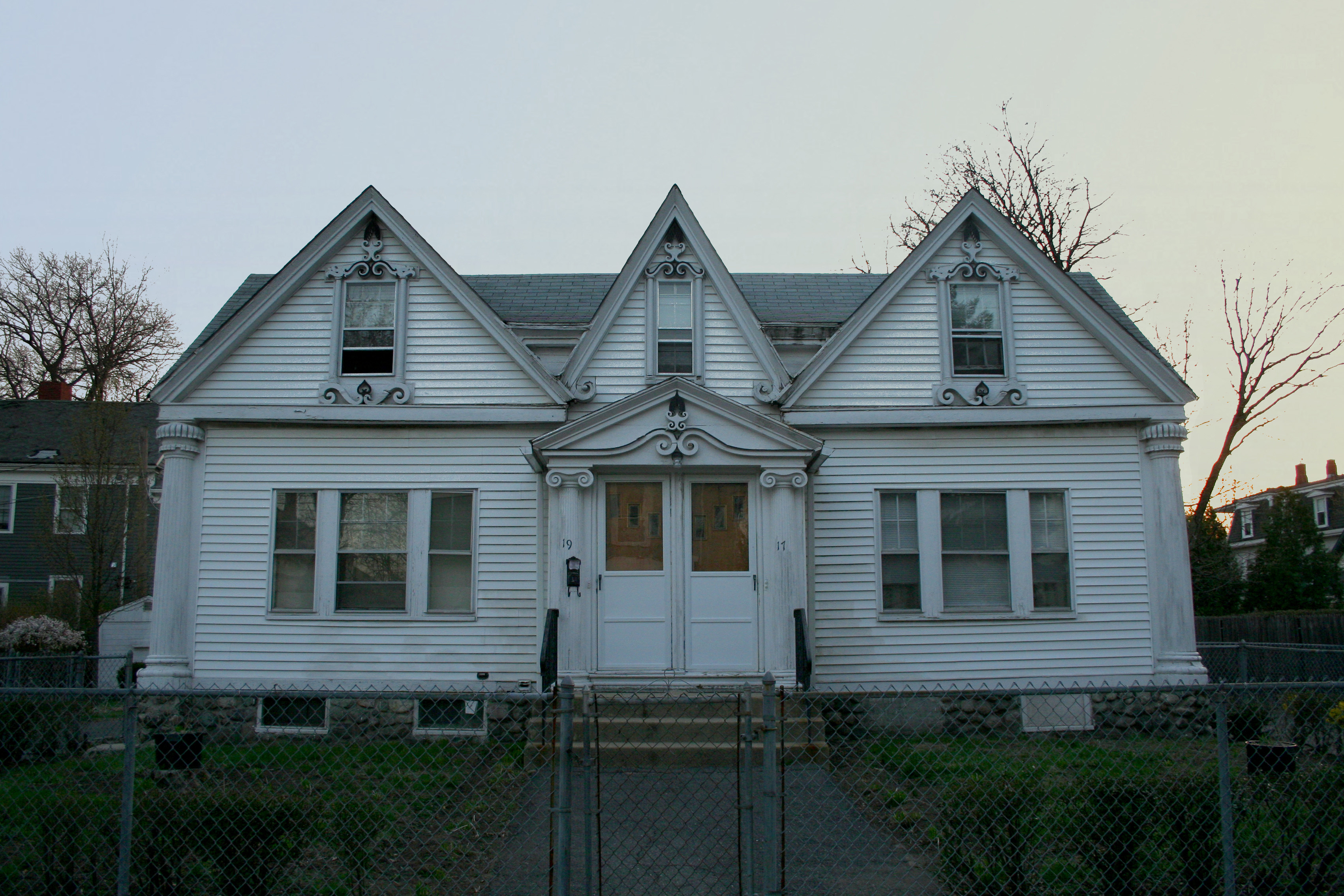

- Location within Massachusetts Location within the United States
- Location: 17 Channing St., Newton, Massachusetts
- Coordinates: 42°21′26″N 71°11′19″W
- Built: 1865
- Architectural style: Gothic Revival, Carpenter Gothic
- MPS: Newton MRA
- NRHP reference No.: 86001893
- Added to NRHP: September 04, 1986

The Thayer House is a historic house at 17 Channing Street in Newton, Massachusetts, USA. It was listed on the National Register of Historic Places in 1986.

== Description ==
The 1 1/2-story wood-frame house was built c. 1860, and is an unusual combination of Carpenter Gothic and Second Empire styling. The front facade has three steeply pitched gables clad in flushboarding, and the gable windows are framed in scroll-sawn decorations. The house corners have rounded corner pilasters, and the main entrance is framed by Ionic columns and topped by a low-pitch gable with more scroll-sawn woodwork. A mansard-roofed addition extends from the rear of the house.

== History ==
By 1869, the neighborhood around Channing Street was developed into house lots on land belonging to Phineas A Johnson, a cabinetmaker. Local Newton resident, developer, and businessman Joseph N. Bacon and Watertown resident Luke Forbes both bought and subdivided Johnson's land creating the neighborhood located on and around Channing Street. Until 1878, when it was incorporated as a city street, Channing Street was known as Linden Street and the neighborhood was built to serve bustling Newton Corner with its convenient rail transportation to Boston. With the exception of 34 Channing Street, an early 20th-century Colonial Revival building, the historic homes along Channing Street were all built within roughly a ten-year period between 1860 and 1870.

Historically, the structure is important for its contribution to the architectural history of Newton as a locally distinctive combination of historic architectural styles (Gothic Revival and Second Empire), as the residence of local merchant Stephen O. Thayer, and as a contributing element in the 19th century character of Channing Street. The property is also historically associated with the development of Newton Corner during the late 19th century as a desirable urban village residence in proximity to railroad transportation to Boston.

== See also ==
- National Register of Historic Places listings in Newton, Massachusetts
