= F. Lincoln Pierce Houses =

Historic houses in Massachusetts, United States

- U.S. National Register of Historic Places
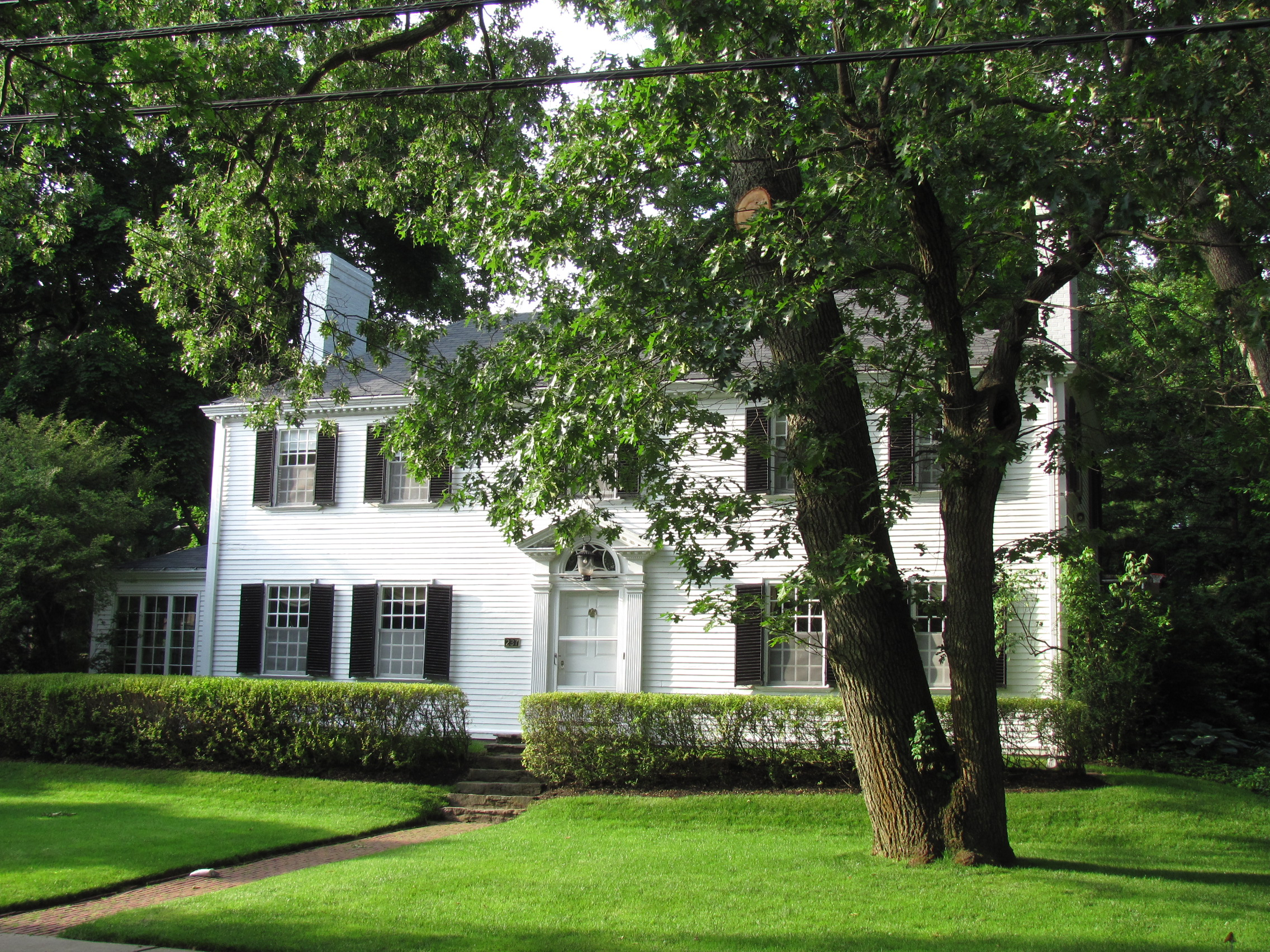
- House at 237 Mill Street

- Location within Massachusetts Location within the United States
- Location: 231-237 Mill St., Newton, Massachusetts
- Coordinates: 42°20′32″N 71°12′12″W
- Built: 1914
- Architect: Derby & Robinson
- Architectural style: Colonial Revival
- MPS: Newton MRA
- NRHP reference No.: 90000041
- Added to NRHP: February 16, 1990

The F. Lincoln Pierce Houses are a pair of historic houses at 231 and 237 Mill Street in Newton, Massachusetts. Both houses were built in 1914 to designs by the Boston firm of Derby & Robinson. The house at 237 Mill Street is a well-executed example of neo-Federalist design, while the smaller house at 231 Mill Street is a more modest Georgian Revival cottage. Both houses were built for Boston lawyer F. Lincoln Pierce, who lived at number 237.

The houses were listed on the National Register of Historic Places in 1990.

== See also ==
- National Register of Historic Places listings in Newton, Massachusetts
