= Mayor Edwin O. Childs House =

Historic house in Massachusetts, United States

- U.S. National Register of Historic Places
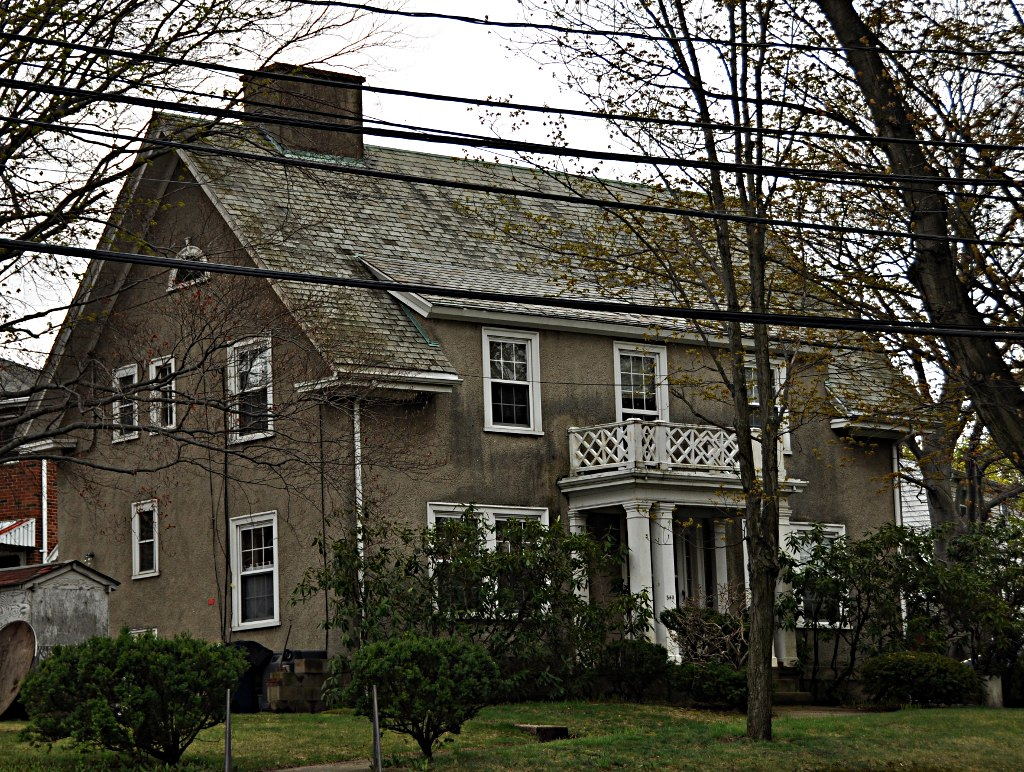

- Location within Massachusetts Location within the United States
- Location: 340 California St., Newton, Massachusetts
- Coordinates: 42°21′53.5″N 71°12′10.0″W
- Built: 1915
- Architect: Brainerd & Leeds
- Architectural style: Bungalow/Craftsman
- MPS: Newton MRA
- NRHP reference No.: 90000039
- Added to NRHP: February 16, 1990

The Mayor Edwin O. Childs House is a historic house located at 340 California Street in Newton, Massachusetts. It is a stucco-clad two story wood-frame structure with a side gable roof and a three-bay shed-roof dormer. The centered entrance is sheltered by a square portico supported by paired square columns and topped by a balustrade.

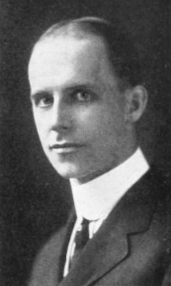
Edwin O. Childs (1876–1950)

The house was built in 1915 to a design by Brainerd and Leeds for Edwin O. Childs, who was then serving as Newton's mayor. The house is a well-preserved example of the Craftsman style.

The house was listed on the National Register of Historic Places in 1990.

== See also ==
- National Register of Historic Places listings in Newton, Massachusetts
