= House at 107 Waban Hill Road =

Historic house in Massachusetts, United States

- U.S. National Register of Historic Places
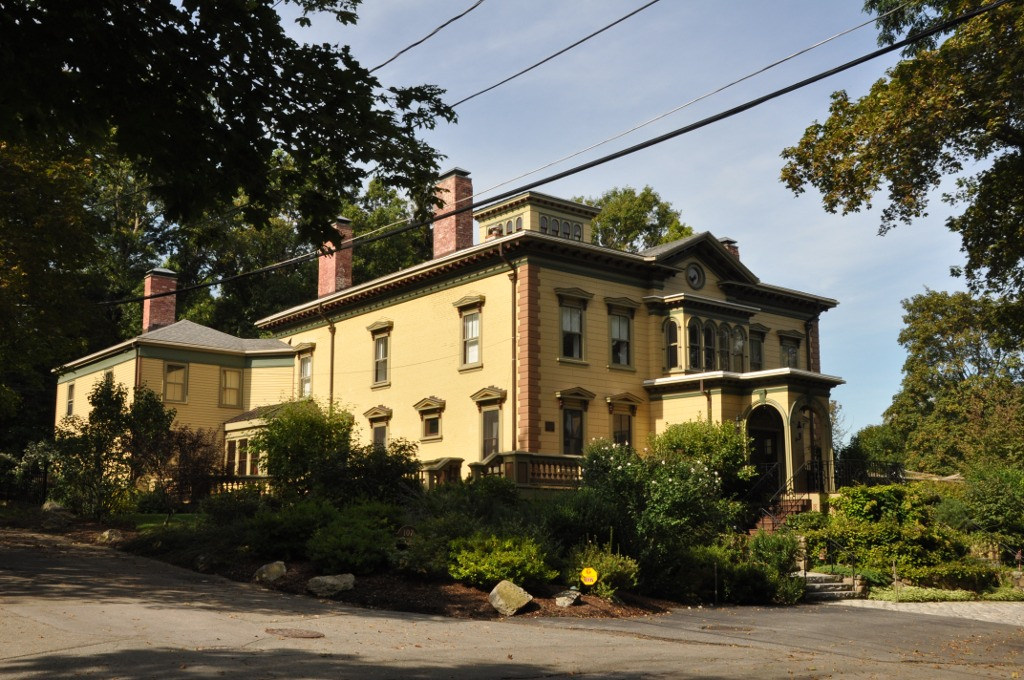

- Location within Massachusetts Location within the United States
- Location: 107 Waban Hill Rd., Newton, Massachusetts
- Coordinates: 42°20′24.7″N 71°10′19.5″W
- Built: 1875
- Architectural style: Italianate
- MPS: Newton MRA
- NRHP reference No.: 86001815
- Added to NRHP: September 04, 1986

The House at 107 Waban Hill Road in eastern Newton, Massachusetts is one of the city's finest examples of formal Italianate styling, set high on Waban Hill with The two story wood-frame house was built c. 1875, and exhibits the full range of Italianate elements, including an extended bracketed eave, quoined corners, elaborate, heavily pedimented windows, and the shallow-pitch central gable on the flushboarded main facade. The main entrance is sheltered by an arched portico, and the roof is topped by a square cupola with bands of narrow round-arch windows on each side.

The house was listed on the National Register of Historic Places in 1986.

== See also ==
- National Register of Historic Places listings in Newton, Massachusetts
