= House at 309 Waltham Street =

Historic house in Massachusetts, United States

- U.S. National Register of Historic Places
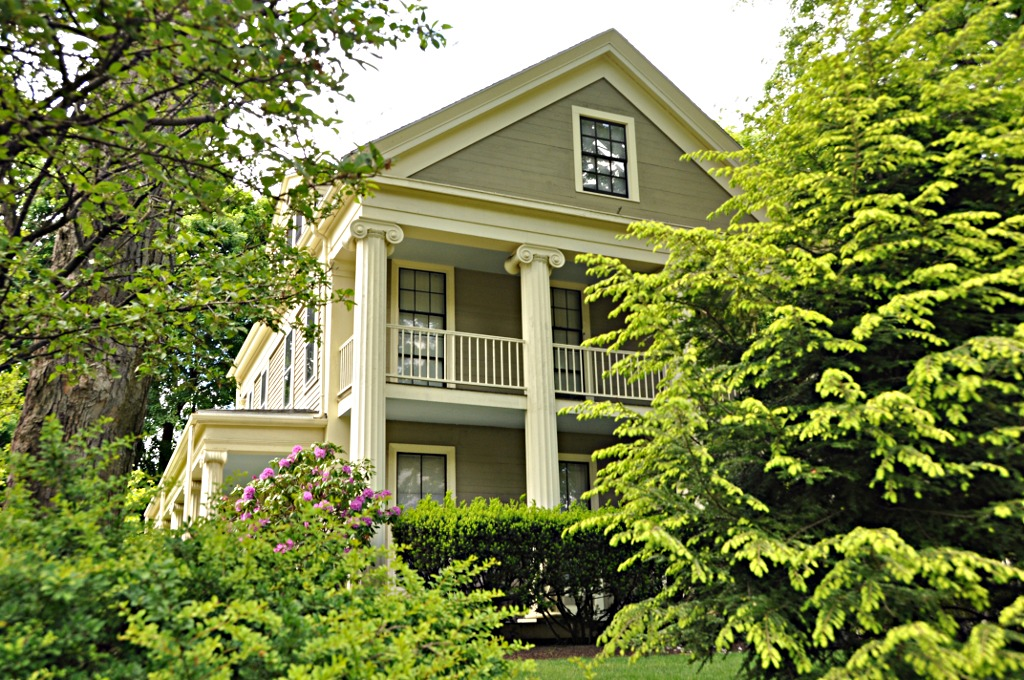

- Location within Massachusetts Location within the United States
- Location: 309 Waltham St., Newton, Massachusetts
- Coordinates: 42°21′23″N 71°13′27″W
- Built: 1835
- Architectural style: Greek Revival
- MPS: Newton MRA
- NRHP reference No.: 86001828
- Added to NRHP: September 04, 1986

The House at 309 Waltham Street in Newton, Massachusetts, is a well-preserved high style Greek Revival house. The 2 1/2-story house was built c. 1835; it has a classic Greek temple front, with two-story Ionic columns supporting an entablature and pedimented gable, with a balcony at the second level. Single-story Ionic columns support a porch running along the left side of the house. It is one six documented temple-front houses in the city.

The house was listed on the National Register of Historic Places in 1986.

== See also ==
- National Register of Historic Places listings in Newton, Massachusetts
