= National Register of Historic Places listings in Newton, Massachusetts =

Location of Newton in Massachusetts

The following properties in Newton, Massachusetts are listed on the National Register of Historic Places. They are a subset of all properties in Middlesex County. There are over 180 places listed in Newton.

The 13 villages are:

- Auburndale
- Chestnut Hill
- Newton Centre
- Newton Corner
- Newton Highlands
- Newton Lower Falls
- Newton Upper Falls
- Newtonville
- Nonantum
- Oak Hill
- Thompsonville
- Waban
- West Newton

This National Park Service list is complete through NPS recent listings posted May 1, 2026.

== Current listings ==
	Name on the Register	Image	Date listed	Location	Village	Description
1	Amos Adams House	Amos Adams House	September 4, 1986 (#86001767)	37 Park Ave. 42°20′44″N 71°11′07″W	Newton Corner	
2	Seth Adams House	Seth Adams House	September 4, 1986 (#86001768)	72 Jewett St. 42°21′31″N 71°11′27″W	Newton Corner	
3	Agudas Achim Anshei Sfard Synagogue	Agudas Achim Anshei Sfard Synagogue	February 16, 1990 (#90000035)	168 Adams St. 42°21′33″N 71°12′05″W	Nonantum	
4	Nathaniel Topliff Allen Homestead	Nathaniel Topliff Allen Homestead	January 9, 1978 (#78000457)	35 Webster St. 42°21′01″N 71°13′43″W	West Newton	
5	Auburndale Congregational Church	Auburndale Congregational Church	September 4, 1986 (#86001769)	64 Hancock St. 42°20′38″N 71°15′01″W	Auburndale	
6	Bartlett-Hawkes Farm	Bartlett-Hawkes Farm	September 4, 1986 (#86001770)	15 Winnetaska Rd. 42°19′41″N 71°14′22″W	Waban	
7	Bayley House	Bayley House	September 4, 1986 (#86001771)	16 Fairmont Ave. 42°20′56″N 71°11′22″W	Newtonville	
8	Bemis Mill	Bemis Mill	September 4, 1986 (#86001773)	1–3 Bridge St. 42°21′55″N 71°12′20″W	Nonantum	
9	Dr. Henry Jacob Bigelow House	Dr. Henry Jacob Bigelow House	January 1, 1976 (#76000266)	72–80 Ober Road; 42°18′09″N 71°11′13″W	Oak Hill	Listed at 742 Dedham St.
10	Henry Bigelow House	Henry Bigelow House	September 4, 1986 (#86001774)	15 Bigelow Terr. 42°21′33″N 71°11′14″W	Newton Corner	This site is in the Watertown Zip Code (02472) but is technically in Newton, so it was put in Newton Corner 024658.
11	William Blodgett House	William Blodgett House	September 4, 1986 (#86001776)	645 Centre St. 42°20′58″N 71°11′17″W	Newton Centre	
12	Boston College Main Campus Historic District	Boston College Main Campus Historic District	January 9, 1990 (#90000109)	140 Commonwealth Ave. 42°20′15″N 71°10′18″W	Chestnut Hill	
13	Boston Edison Power Station	Boston Edison Power Station	February 16, 1990 (#90000023)	374 Homer St. 42°20′11″N 71°12′37″W	Newton Centre	
14	Brackett House	Brackett House	September 4, 1986 (#86001777)	621 Centre St. 42°21′00″N 71°11′15″W	Newton Centre	
15	Brae-Burn Historic District	Brae-Burn Historic District	February 16, 1990 (#90000009)	Brae Burn and Windmere Rds. 42°20′36″N 71°14′24″W	West Newton	
16	Brandeis University President's House	Brandeis University President's House	August 19, 1998 (#98000990)	66 Beaumont Ave. 42°20′30″N 71°12′37″W	Newtonville	
17	Mayall Bruner House	Mayall Bruner House	February 16, 1990 (#90000040)	36 Magnolia Ave. 42°20′43″N 71°10′45″W	Newton Corner	
18	John Buckingham House	John Buckingham House	September 4, 1986 (#86001778)	33–35 Waban St. 42°21′27″N 71°11′27″W	Newton Corner	
19	Building at 1–6 Walnut Terrace	Building at 1–6 Walnut Terrace	September 4, 1986 (#86001779)	1–6 Walnut Terr. 42°21′09″N 71°12′26″W	Newtonville	
20	Central Congregational Church	Central Congregational Church	September 4, 1986 (#86001781)	218 Walnut St. 42°21′10″N 71°12′29″W	Newtonville	
21	Charles River Reservation Parkways	Charles River Reservation Parkways	January 18, 2006 (#05001530)	Soldiers Field, Nonantum, Leo Birmingham, Arsenal, Greenough, N. Beacon, Charles River, Norumbega, Recreation; 42°21′42″N 71°09′31″W		Extends into Cambridge, Waltham, and Watertown and Weston, elsewhere in Middlesex County, and into Boston in Suffolk County
22	Chestnut Hill Historic District	Chestnut Hill Historic District	October 17, 1985 (#85003253)	Roughly bounded by Middlesex Rd., Reservoir Ln., Denny Rd., Boylston St. and Dunster Rd. 42°19′36″N 71°09′32″W	Chestnut Hill	Mostly in Brookline, with properties overlapping into Newton.
23	The Chestnut Hill	The Chestnut Hill	September 4, 1986 (#86001782)	219 Commonwealth Ave. 42°20′16″N 71°10′31″W	Chestnut Hill	
24	Chestnut Hill Reservoir Historic District	Chestnut Hill Reservoir Historic District	January 18, 1990 (#89002271)	Beacon St. and Commonwealth Ave. 42°19′58″N 71°09′27″W	Chestnut Hill	This district is mostly in Boston.
25	Mayor Edwin O. Childs House	Mayor Edwin O. Childs House	February 16, 1990 (#90000039)	340 California St. 42°21′53″N 71°12′11″W	Nonantum	
26	William L. Church House	William L. Church House	February 21, 1990 (#90000112)	145 Warren St. 42°19′47″N 71°11′23″W	Newton Centre	
27	City Stable and Garage	City Stable and Garage	February 16, 1990 (#90000022)	74 Elliot St. 42°18′57″N 71°12′50″W	Newton Highlands	
28	Claflin School	Claflin School	August 16, 1984 (#84002543)	110–112 Washington Park; 42°20′56″N 71°12′24″W	Newtonville	
29	Adams Claflin House	Adams Claflin House	September 4, 1986 (#86001783)	156 Grant Ave. 42°20′03″N 71°11′16″W	Newton Centre	
30	Clark House	Clark House	September 4, 1986 (#86001785)	379 Central St. 42°20′28″N 71°15′19″W	Auburndale	
31	Colby Hall	Colby Hall	January 30, 1978 (#78000459)	141 Herrick Rd. 42°19′33″N 71°11′31″W	Newton Centre	1866 building on campus of Andover Newton Theological School. It is now the headquarters of a design firm.
32	Frederick Collins House	Frederick Collins House	September 4, 1986 (#86001786)	1734 Beacon St. 42°19′32″N 71°14′00″W	Waban	
33	Commonwealth Avenue Historic District	Commonwealth Avenue Historic District	February 16, 1990 (#90000012)	Roughly Commonwealth Ave. from Walnut St. to Waban Hill Rd. 42°20′17″N 71°11′24″W		
34	Crafts Street City Stable	Crafts Street City Stable	December 18, 2009 (#09001095)	90 Crafts St. 42°21′18″N 71°12′06″W	Newton Corner	Near Ashmont Avenue. Found on Google Maps by searching for Crafts Street, Newtonville, MA 02460
35	Thomas A. Crimmins House	Thomas A. Crimmins House	February 16, 1990 (#90000021)	19 Dartmouth St. 42°20′19″N 71°13′36″W	West Newton	
36	Crystal Lake and Pleasant Street Historic District	Crystal Lake and Pleasant Street Historic District	September 4, 1986 (#86001735)	Roughly bounded by Sudbury Aqueduct, Pleasant Ave., Lake Ave., and Crystal St. and Webster Ct. 42°19′48″N 71°12′05″W	Newton Centre	
37	William Curtis House	William Curtis House	September 4, 1986 (#86001788)	2330 Washington St. 42°19′31″N 71°15′27″W	Newton Lower Falls	
38	Seth Davis House	Seth Davis House	September 4, 1986 (#86001960)	32 Eden Ave. 42°21′03″N 71°13′30″W	West Newton	
39	Day Estate Historic District	Day Estate Historic District	February 16, 1990 (#90000008)	Commonwealth Ave. and Dartmouth St. 42°20′18″N 71°13′31″W	West Newton	
40	Dupee Estate	Dupee Estate	September 4, 1986 (#86001790)	400 Beacon St. 42°19′57″N 71°10′28″W	Chestnut Hill	Mary Baker Eddy's last home
41	Capt. Edward Durant House	Capt. Edward Durant House	May 13, 1976 (#76000267)	286 Waverly Ave. 42°20′46″N 71°10′52″W	Newton Centre	
42	East Parish Burying Ground	East Parish Burying Ground	November 23, 1983 (#83004010)	Centre and Cotton Sts. 42°20′26″N 71°11′28″W	Newton Corner	
43	Echo Bridge	Echo Bridge	April 9, 1980 (#80000638)	Spans Charles River; 42°18′53″N 71°13′39″W	Newton Upper Falls	
44	George W. Eddy House	George W. Eddy House	February 16, 1990 (#90000038)	85 Bigelow Rd. 42°20′26″N 71°13′02″W	West Newton	
45	Charles D. Elliott House	Charles D. Elliott House	September 4, 1986 (#86001792)	7 Colman St. 42°21′13″N 71°13′25″W	West Newton	
46	The Eminence	The Eminence	September 4, 1986 (#86001793)	122 Islington Rd. 42°20′59″N 71°15′30″W	Auburndale	Private home
47	Rufus Estabrook House	Rufus Estabrook House	September 4, 1986 (#86001795)	33 Woodland Rd. 42°20′39″N 71°15′09″W	Auburndale	
48	Evangelical Baptist Church	Evangelical Baptist Church	September 4, 1986 (#86001796)	23 Chapel St. 42°21′51″N 71°12′10″W	Nonantum	
49	Farlow and Kendrick Parks Historic District	Farlow and Kendrick Parks Historic District	July 8, 1982 (#82002745)	Roughly bounded by Franklin, Park, Church, Center and Wesley Sts. and Maple Ave.; also 223, 226, 234, 237, 242, 243, 248, and 256 Park St. 42°21′12″N 71°11′07″W	Newton Corner	Park Street addresses represent a boundary increase of September 4, 1986
50	Farlow Hill Historic District	Farlow Hill Historic District	February 21, 1990 (#90000110)	Roughly bounded by Shornecliffe Rd., Franklin St., Chamberlain Rd., Huntington Rd., and Farlow Rd. 42°20′52″N 71°10′42″W	Newton Corner	
51	Samuel Farquhar House	Samuel Farquhar House	September 4, 1986 (#86001798)	7 Channing St. 42°21′29″N 71°11′17″W	Newton Corner	
52	John A. Fenno House	John A. Fenno House	September 4, 1986 (#86001800)	171 Lowell Ave. 42°21′04″N 71°12′41″W	Newtonville	
53	Reginald A. Fessenden House	Reginald A. Fessenden House	January 7, 1976 (#76000950)	45 Waban Hill Rd. 42°20′24″N 71°10′18″W	Chestnut Hill	Newton's only National Historic Landmark
54	First Baptist Church in Newton	First Baptist Church in Newton	April 15, 1982 (#82002746)	848 Beacon St. 42°19′46″N 71°11′47″W	Newton Centre	
55	First Unitarian Church	First Unitarian Church	September 4, 1986 (#86001802)	1326 Washington St. 42°20′54″N 71°13′41″W	West Newton	
56	Capt. Edward Fuller Farm	Capt. Edward Fuller Farm	September 4, 1986 (#86001804)	59–71 North St. 42°21′41″N 71°13′01″W	Newtonville	
57	Henry Gane House	Henry Gane House	September 4, 1986 (#86001806)	121 Adena Rd. 42°21′19″N 71°13′31″W	West Newton	
58	Lafayette Goodbar House	Lafayette Goodbar House	February 16, 1990 (#90000044)	614 Walnut St. 42°20′24″N 71°12′21″W	Newtonville	
59	Gray Cliff Historic District	Gray Cliff Historic District	September 4, 1986 (#86001741)	35, 39, 43, 53, 54, 64, 65, and 70 Gray Cliff Rd.; also The Ledges and Bishopsgate Rds. 42°19′51″N 71°11′11″W	Newton Centre	Second set of boundaries represents a boundary increase of September 4, 1986
60	Jos. Gunderson House	Jos. Gunderson House	September 4, 1986 (#86001808)	983 Centre St. 42°20′18″N 71°11′39″W	Newton Centre	
61	Hammond House	Hammond House	March 9, 1990 (#90000175)	9 Old Orchard Rd. 42°19′56″N 71°10′26″W	Chestnut Hill	
62	E. C. Hammond House	E. C. Hammond House	February 16, 1990 (#90000046)	35 Groveland St. 42°20′40″N 71°14′48″W	Auburndale	
63	Hammond Pond Parkway	Hammond Pond Parkway	March 18, 2004 (#04000250)	Hammond Pond Parkway; 42°19′16″N 71°10′20″W	Chestnut Hill	Extends into Brookline in Norfolk County.
64	John Harbach House	John Harbach House	September 4, 1986 (#86001809)	303 Ward St. 42°20′20″N 71°11′09″W	Newton Centre	
65	Harding House-Walker Missionary Home	Harding House-Walker Missionary Home	September 4, 1986 (#86001810)	161–163 Grove St. 42°20′30″N 71°15′03″W	Auburndale	
66	Henry I. Harriman House	Henry I. Harriman House	February 16, 1990 (#90000028)	825 Centre St. 42°20′38″N 71°11′32″W	Newton Centre	
67	C. Lewis Harrison House	C. Lewis Harrison House	February 16, 1990 (#90000045)	14 Eliot Memorial Rd. 42°20′39″N 71°10′46″W	Newton Centre	
68	Charles Haskell House	Charles Haskell House	September 4, 1986 (#86001812)	27 Sargent St. 42°20′49″N 71°10′58″W	Newton Corner	
69	Fred R. Hayward House	Fred R. Hayward House	February 16, 1990 (#90000025)	1547 Centre St. 42°19′20″N 71°12′09″W	Newton Highlands	
70	Frank B. Hopewell House	Frank B. Hopewell House	February 16, 1990 (#90000034)	301 Waverley Ave. 42°20′45″N 71°10′56″W	Newton Corner	
71	House at 1008 Beacon Street	House at 1008 Beacon Street	September 4, 1986 (#86001813)	1008 Beacon St. 42°19′48″N 71°12′13″W	Newton Centre	
72	House at 102 Staniford Street	House at 102 Staniford Street	September 4, 1986 (#86001814)	102 Staniford St. 42°21′11″N 71°14′55″W	Auburndale	
73	House at 107 Waban Hill Road	House at 107 Waban Hill Road	September 4, 1986 (#86001815)	107 Waban Hill Rd. 42°20′25″N 71°10′21″W	Chestnut Hill	
74	House at 115–117 Jewett Street	House at 115–117 Jewett Street	September 4, 1986 (#86001816)	115–117 Jewett St. 42°21′25″N 71°11′32″W	Newton Corner	
75	House at 15 Davis Avenue	House at 15 Davis Avenue	September 4, 1986 (#86001817)	15 Davis Ave. 42°21′07″N 71°13′31″W	West Newton	
76	House at 152 Suffolk Road	House at 152 Suffolk Road	September 4, 1986 (#86001818)	152 Suffolk Rd. 42°19′43″N 71°10′21″W	Chestnut Hill	
77	House at 170 Otis Street	House at 170 Otis Street	September 4, 1986 (#86001819)	170 Otis St. 42°20′46″N 71°12′55″W	West Newton	
78	House at 173–175 Ward Street	House at 173–175 Ward Street	September 4, 1986 (#86001820)	173–175 Ward St. 42°20′20″N 71°10′50″W	Newton Centre	
79	House at 203 Islington Road	House at 203 Islington Road	September 4, 1986 (#86001821)	203 Islington Rd. 42°21′05″N 71°15′20″W	Auburndale	
80	House at 215 Brookline Street	House at 215 Brookline Street	September 4, 1986 (#86001822)	215 Brookline St. 42°18′06″N 71°10′42″W	Newton Centre	
81	House at 2212 Commonwealth Avenue	House at 2212 Commonwealth Avenue	September 4, 1986 (#86001823)	2212 Commonwealth Ave. 42°20′48″N 71°15′11″W	Auburndale	
82	House at 230 Melrose Street	House at 230 Melrose Street	September 4, 1986 (#86001961)	230 Melrose St. 42°20′54″N 71°15′04″W	Auburndale	
83	House at 230 Winchester Street	House at 230 Winchester Street	September 4, 1986 (#86001825)	230 Winchester St. 42°18′44″N 71°12′34″W	Newton Highlands	
84	House at 3 Davis Avenue	House at 3 Davis Avenue	September 4, 1986 (#86001826)	3 Davis Ave. 42°21′07″N 71°13′32″W	West Newton	
85	House at 307 Lexington Street	House at 307 Lexington Street	September 4, 1986 (#86001827)	307 Lexington St. 42°21′05″N 71°14′49″W	Auburndale	
86	House at 309 Waltham Street	House at 309 Waltham Street	September 4, 1986 (#86001828)	309 Waltham St. 42°21′23″N 71°13′27″W	West Newton	
87	House at 31 Woodbine Street	House at 31 Woodbine Street	September 4, 1986 (#86001829)	31 Woodbine St. 42°20′47″N 71°15′08″W	Auburndale	
88	House at 41 Middlesex Road	House at 41 Middlesex Road	September 4, 1986 (#86001830)	41 Middlesex Rd. 42°19′33″N 71°09′50″W	Chestnut Hill	
89	House at 47 Sargent Street	House at 47 Sargent Street	September 4, 1986 (#86001831)	47 Sargent St. 42°20′50″N 71°11′01″W	Newton Corner	
90	House at 511 Watertown Street	House at 511 Watertown Street	September 4, 1986 (#86001832)	511 Watertown St. 42°21′27″N 71°12′24″W	Newtonville	
91	House at 60 William Street	House at 60 William Street	September 4, 1986 (#86001833)	19 Jefferson St. 42°21′34″N 71°10′58″W	Newton Corner	Listed on the register at 60 William Street.
92	House at 68 Maple Street	House at 68 Maple Street	September 4, 1986 (#86001963)	68 Maple St. 42°21′36″N 71°10′58″W	Newton Corner	
93	House at 729 Dedham Street	House at 729 Dedham Street	September 4, 1986 (#86001835)	729 Dedham St. 42°18′01″N 71°11′20″W	Newton Centre	
94	House at 81–83 Gardner Street	House at 81–83 Gardner Street	September 4, 1986 (#86001836)	81–83 Gardner St. 42°21′35″N 71°11′34″W	Newton Corner	
95	C. G. Howes Dry Cleaning-Carley Real Estate	C. G. Howes Dry Cleaning-Carley Real Estate	February 16, 1990 (#90000031)	1171 Washington St. 42°20′57″N 71°13′18″W	West Newton	Listed at 1173 Washington.
96	Hyde Avenue Historic District	Hyde Avenue Historic District	December 23, 1986 (#86001742)	36, 42, 52, 59, and 62 Hyde Ave. 42°20′54″N 71°11′10″W	Newton Corner	
97	Hyde House	Hyde House	September 4, 1986 (#86001838)	27 George St. 42°20′53″N 71°11′15″W	Newton Corner	
98	Eleazer Hyde House	Eleazer Hyde House	September 4, 1986 (#86001839)	401 Woodward St. 42°19′34″N 71°13′40″W	Waban	
99	Gershom Hyde House	Gershom Hyde House	September 4, 1986 (#86001840)	29 Greenwood St. 42°18′37″N 71°10′58″W	Newton Centre	
100	Jackson Homestead	Jackson Homestead	June 4, 1973 (#73000306)	527 Washington St. 42°21′19″N 71°11′43″W	Newton Corner	Built 1809, home of a Congressman and station on the Underground Railroad. Now the Newton History Museum
101	Jackson House	Jackson House	September 4, 1986 (#86001841)	125 Jackson St. 42°19′13″N 71°11′18″W	Newton Centre	
102	Samuel Jackson, Jr. House	Samuel Jackson, Jr. House	September 4, 1986 (#86001843)	137 Washington St. 42°21′21″N 71°10′49″W	Newton Corner	
103	Joshua Jennison House	Joshua Jennison House	September 4, 1986 (#86001844)	11 Thornton St. 42°21′28″N 71°11′24″W	Newton Corner	
104	Amos Judkins House	Amos Judkins House	September 4, 1986 (#86001846)	8 Central Ave. 42°21′22″N 71°12′23″W	Newtonville	
105	William F. Kessler House	William F. Kessler House	February 16, 1990 (#90000048)	211 Highland St. 42°20′52″N 71°13′01″W	Newtonville	
106	King House	King House	September 4, 1986 (#86001847)	328 Brookline St. 42°18′04″N 71°10′47″W	Newton Centre	
107	Kingsbury House	Kingsbury House	September 4, 1986 (#86001848)	137 Suffolk St. 42°19′44″N 71°10′17″W	Chestnut Hill	
108	Kistler House	Kistler House	September 4, 1986 (#86001849)	945 Beacon St. 42°19′50″N 71°12′05″W	Newton Centre	
109	Lasell Neighborhood Historic District	Lasell Neighborhood Historic District	September 4, 1986 (#86001744)	Roughly bounded by Woodland and Studio Rds., Aspen and Seminary Aves., and Grove St. 42°20′26″N 71°14′49″W	Auburndale	
110	Arthur F. Luke House	Arthur F. Luke House	February 16, 1990 (#90000042)	221 Prince St. 42°20′21″N 71°13′25″W	West Newton	
111	Charles Maynard House	Charles Maynard House	April 4, 1996 (#96000364)	459 Crafts St. 42°21′31″N 71°12′42″W	West Newton	
112	Galen Merriam House	Galen Merriam House	September 4, 1986 (#86001850)	102 Highland St. 42°20′45″N 71°13′33″W	West Newton	
113	Monadnock Road Historic District	Monadnock Road Historic District	February 16, 1990 (#90000019)	Roughly Monadnock Rd., Wachusett Rd., Hudson St., Tudor Rd., Beacon St., and Hobart Rd. 42°20′03″N 71°10′47″W	Newton Centre	
114	Morton Road Historic District	Morton Road Historic District	February 16, 1990 (#90000010)	Morton Rd. at Morton St. 42°20′21″N 71°12′07″W	Newton Centre	
115	Mount Pleasant	Mount Pleasant	September 4, 1986 (#86001851)	15 Bracebridge Rd. 42°19′53″N 71°12′08″W	Newton Centre	
116	Myrtle Baptist Church Neighborhood Historic District	Myrtle Baptist Church Neighborhood Historic District	December 11, 2008 (#08001178)	Roughly Curve St. and Prospect St. 42°20′48″N 71°14′05″W	West Newton	
117	Needham Street Bridge	Needham Street Bridge	September 4, 1986 (#86001852)	Needham St. at Charles River; 42°18′23″N 71°13′03″W	Newton Highlands	Extends into Needham in Norfolk County
118	Newton Centre Branch Library	Newton Centre Branch Library	February 16, 1990 (#90000024)	1294 Centre St. 42°19′45″N 71°11′43″W	Newton Centre	
119	Newton City Hall and War Memorial	Newton City Hall and War Memorial	February 16, 1990 (#90000020)	1000 Commonwealth Ave. 42°20′14″N 71°12′33″W	Newton Centre	
120	Newton Cottage Hospital Historic District	Newton Cottage Hospital Historic District	February 21, 1990 (#90000108)	2014 Washington St. 42°19′53″N 71°14′42″W	Newton Lower Falls	The campus of Newton-Wellesley Hospital.
121	Newton Highlands Historic District	Newton Highlands Historic District	September 4, 1986 (#86001747)	Roughly bounded by Lincoln and Hartford Sts., Erie Ave., and Woodward St.; also roughly Lincoln St., Hartford St., Erie Ave., and Woodward St. 42°19′13″N 71°12′39″W	Newton Highlands	Second set of boundaries represents a boundary increase of February 16, 1990
122	Newton Lower Falls Historic District	Newton Lower Falls Historic District	September 4, 1986 (#86001748)	Roughly bounded by Hagar, Grove, Washington, and Concord Sts. 42°19′35″N 71°15′29″W	Newton Lower Falls	
123	Newton Street Railway Carbarn	Newton Street Railway Carbarn	September 4, 1986 (#86001855)	1121 Washington St. 42°20′58″N 71°13′13″W	West Newton	
124	Newton Theological Institution Historic District	Newton Theological Institution Historic District	September 4, 1986 (#86001749)	Roughly bounded by Braeland Ave., Ripley St. and Langley Rd., Bowdoin School Access Rd., and Cypress St. 42°19′31″N 71°11′25″W	Newton Centre	
125	Newton Upper Falls Historic District	Newton Upper Falls Historic District	September 4, 1986 (#86001750)	Roughly bounded by Boylston, Elliot, and Oak Sts., and the Charles River; 42°18′49″N 71°13′23″W	Newton Upper Falls	
126	Newtonville Historic District	Newtonville Historic District	September 4, 1986 (#90000014)	Roughly bounded by Highland Ave., Walnut Mill St., Otis St., and Lowell Ave.; also roughly Highland and Lowell Aves., Otis St., and Birch Hill Rd., and Walnut St. from Newtonville to Washington; 42°20′44″N 71°12′28″W	Newtonville	Second set of boundaries represents a boundary increase of February 16, 1990
127	Nichols House	Nichols House	September 4, 1986 (#86001857)	140 Sargent St. 42°20′46″N 71°11′13″W	Newton Corner	
128	Charles W. Noyes House	Charles W. Noyes House	February 16, 1990 (#90000030)	271 Chestnut St. 42°20′24″N 71°13′28″W	West Newton	
129	Old Chestnut Hill Historic District	Old Chestnut Hill Historic District	September 4, 1986 (#86001756)	Along Hammond St. and Chestnut Hill Rd. roughly bounded by Beacon St. and Essex Rd., and Suffolk Rd.; also roughly Chestnut Hill, Essex, and Gate House, Middlesex, Hammond, and Longwood, and Suffolk and Old Orchard; also Suffolk Rd. 42°19′45″N 71°10′00″W	Chestnut Hill	Second and third sets of boundaries represent boundary increases of February 16, 1990 and July 8, 1999 respectively
130	Old Shephard Farm	Old Shephard Farm	September 4, 1986 (#86001859)	1832 Washington St. 42°20′10″N 71°14′28″W	Auburndale	
131	Our Lady Help of Christians Historic District	Our Lady Help of Christians Historic District	September 4, 1986 (#86001758)	Adams and Washington Sts. 42°21′19″N 71°11′53″W	Nonantum	
132	H. P. Page House	H. P. Page House	September 4, 1986 (#86001860)	110 Jewett St. 42°21′25″N 71°11′30″W	Newton Corner	
133	Edward Parsons House	Edward Parsons House	September 4, 1986 (#86001862)	56 Cedar St. 42°20′18″N 71°11′56″W	Newton Centre	
134	Peabody-Williams House	Peabody-Williams House	September 4, 1986 (#86001863)	7 Norman Rd. 42°19′32″N 71°12′18″W	Newton Highlands	
135	Peirce School	Peirce School	December 6, 1979 (#79000357)	88 Chestnut St. 42°20′48″N 71°13′28″W	West Newton	
136	F. Lincoln Pierce Houses	F. Lincoln Pierce Houses	February 16, 1990 (#90000041)	231–237 Mill St. 42°20′32″N 71°12′12″W	Newtonville	
137	Pine Ridge Road-Plainfield Street Historic District	Pine Ridge Road-Plainfield Street Historic District	February 16, 1990 (#90000015)	Roughly Pine Ridge Rd., Upland Rd., Plainfield St., and Chestnut St. 42°19′38″N 71°13′29″W	Waban	
138	Plummer Memorial Library	Plummer Memorial Library	February 16, 1990 (#90000036)	375 Auburn St. 42°20′46″N 71°14′59″W	Auburndale	
139	Potter Estate	Potter Estate	December 23, 1986 (#86001864)	65–71 Walnut Pk. 42°21′24″N 71°11′42″W	Newtonville	
140	Prescott Estate	Prescott Estate	September 4, 1986 (#86001866)	770 Centre St. 42°20′45″N 71°11′23″W	Newton Centre	
141	Putnam Street Historic District	Putnam Street Historic District	September 4, 1986 (#86001760)	Roughly bounded by Winthrop, Putnam, Temple, and Shaw Sts. 42°20′43″N 71°13′44″W	West Newton	
142	Railroad Hotel	Railroad Hotel	September 4, 1986 (#86001868)	1273–1279 Washington St. 42°20′58″N 71°13′35″W	West Newton	
143	Rawson Estate	Rawson Estate	September 4, 1986 (#86001869)	41 Vernon St. 42°21′16″N 71°10′55″W	Newton Corner	
144	James Lorin Richards House	James Lorin Richards House	September 4, 1986 (#86001871)	47 Kirkstall and 22 Oakwood Rds. 42°20′37″N 71°12′14″W	Newton Centre	
145	Charles Riley House	Charles Riley House	September 4, 1986 (#86001872)	93 Bellevue St. 42°21′06″N 71°11′27″W	Newton Corner	
146	Riverside Concrete Company-Lamont's Market	Riverside Concrete Company-Lamont's Market	February 16, 1990 (#90000029)	2 Charles St. 42°20′40″N 71°15′20″W	Auburndale	
147	Saco-Pettee Machine Shops	Saco-Pettee Machine Shops	December 23, 1986 (#86001964)	156 Oak St. 42°18′32″N 71°13′05″W	Newton Upper Falls	
148	Saco-Lowell Shops Housing Historic District	Saco-Lowell Shops Housing Historic District	February 16, 1990 (#90000016)	Oak, William, Butts, and Saco Sts. 42°18′27″N 71°13′14″W	Newton Upper Falls	
149	Jonas Salisbury House	Jonas Salisbury House	September 4, 1986 (#86001875)	62 Walnut Pk. 42°21′25″N 71°11′36″W	Newtonville	
150	Jonas Salisbury House	Jonas Salisbury House	September 4, 1986 (#86001876)	85 Langley Rd. 42°19′45″N 71°11′30″W	Newtonville	
151	C. A. Sawyer House (Second)	C. A. Sawyer House (Second)	February 16, 1990 (#90000043)	86 Waban St. 42°19′28″N 71°14′05″W	Waban	Incorrectly listed on the register at 221 Prince St.
152	Second Church of Newton	Second Church of Newton	February 16, 1990 (#90000049)	60 Highland St. 42°20′50″N 71°13′35″W	West Newton	
153	Simpson House	Simpson House	September 4, 1986 (#86001880)	57 Hunnewell Ave. 42°21′21″N 71°10′30″W	Newton Corner	
154	Curtis S. Smith House	Curtis S. Smith House	September 4, 1986 (#86001881)	56 Fairmont Ave. 42°20′58″N 71°11′27″W	Newton Corner	
155	Smith-Peterson House	Smith-Peterson House	September 4, 1986 (#86001882)	32 Farlow Rd. 42°20′49″N 71°10′44″W	Newton Corner	
156	South Burying Ground	South Burying Ground	November 27, 2004 (#04001256)	Winchester St. 42°19′04″N 71°12′35″W	Newton Highlands	
157	John Souther House	John Souther House	September 4, 1986 (#86001883)	43 Fairmont St. 42°20′59″N 71°11′24″W	Newton Corner	
158	St. Mary's Church and Cemetery	St. Mary's Church and Cemetery	April 16, 1980 (#80000637)	258 Concord St. 42°19′35″N 71°15′29″W	Newton Lower Falls	
159	Staples-Crafts-Wiswall Farm	Staples-Crafts-Wiswall Farm	September 4, 1986 (#86001884)	1615 Beacon St. 42°19′38″N 71°13′50″W	Waban	
160	Frank H. Stewart House	Frank H. Stewart House	February 21, 1990 (#90000111)	41 Montvale Rd. 42°20′07″N 71°11′04″W	Newton Centre	
161	Joseph L. Stone House	Joseph L. Stone House	September 4, 1986 (#86001889)	77–85 Temple St. 42°20′39″N 71°13′47″W	West Newton	
162	Edward B. Stratton House	Edward B. Stratton House	February 16, 1990 (#90000050)	25 Kenmore St. 42°19′41″N 71°12′15″W	Newton Centre	
163	Strong's Block	Strong's Block	September 4, 1986 (#86001891)	1637–1651 Beacon St. 42°19′35″N 71°13′53″W	Waban	
164	Sudbury Aqueduct Linear District	Sudbury Aqueduct Linear District	January 18, 1990 (#89002293)	Along Sudbury Aqueduct from Farm Pond at Waverly St. to Chestnut Hill Reservoir; 42°18′53″N 71°13′37″W		16-mile long historic district along the Sudbury Aqueduct from Farm Pond at Waverly Street in Framingham to Chestnut Hill Reservoir in Boston.
165	Sumner and Gibbs Streets Historic District	Sumner and Gibbs Streets Historic District	September 4, 1986 (#86001762)	Roughly Sumner St. between Willow St. and Cotswold Terr. and 184 Gibbs St. 42°20′00″N 71°11′32″W	Newton Centre	
166	Celia Thaxter House	Celia Thaxter House	September 4, 1986 (#86001892)	524 California St. 42°21′41″N 71°12′35″W	Newtonville	
167	Thayer House	Thayer House	September 4, 1986 (#86001893)	17 Channing St. 42°21′26″N 71°11′19″W	Newton Corner	
168	Loren Towle Estate	Loren Towle Estate	February 16, 1990 (#90000026)	785 Centre St. 42°20′43″N 71°11′31″W	Newton Corner	
169	Union Street Historic District	Union Street Historic District	September 4, 1986 (#86001763)	Roughly Union St. between Langley Rd. and Herrick St., and 17–31 Herrick St. 42°19′46″N 71°11′36″W	Newton Centre	
170	Waban Branch Library	Waban Branch Library	February 16, 1990 (#90000037)	1608 Beacon St. 42°19′37″N 71°13′49″W	Waban	
171	Walker Home for Missionary Children	Walker Home for Missionary Children	June 4, 1992 (#90000047)	161–63, 165, 167 Grove St., 136, 138, 144 Hancock St. 42°20′29″N 71°15′05″W	Auburndale	
172	Ephraim Ward House	Ephraim Ward House	September 4, 1986 (#86001894)	121 Ward St. 42°20′16″N 71°10′40″W	Chestnut Hill	
173	Ware Paper Mill	Ware Paper Mill	May 22, 1978 (#78000458)	2276 Washington St. 42°19′33″N 71°15′19″W	Newton Lower Falls	
174	Dr. Samuel Warren House	Dr. Samuel Warren House	January 3, 1985 (#85000028)	432 Cherry St. 42°20′59″N 71°13′42″W	West Newton	
175	Levi Warren Jr. High School	Levi Warren Jr. High School	February 16, 1990 (#90000032)	1600 Washington St. 42°20′35″N 71°14′09″W	West Newton	
176	Washington Park Historic District	Washington Park Historic District	March 12, 2008 (#08000166)	4–97 Washington Park, 5 and 15 Park Place; 42°20′58″N 71°12′11″W	Newtonville	
177	Webster Park Historic District	Webster Park Historic District	September 4, 1986 (#86001764)	Along Webster Pk. and Webster St. between Westwood St. and Oak Ave. 42°20′58″N 71°13′46″W	West Newton	
178	Weeks Junior High School	Weeks Junior High School	October 23, 1984 (#84000105)	7 Hereward Rd. 42°19′29″N 71°11′50″W	Newton Centre	
179	West Newton Hill Historic District	West Newton Hill Historic District	September 4, 1986 (#86001766)	Roughly bounded by Highland Ave., Lenox, Hampshire, and Chestnut Sts. 42°20′37″N 71°13′16″W	West Newton	
180	West Newton Village Center Historic District	West Newton Village Center Historic District	February 16, 1990 (#90000017)	Roughly Washington St. from Putnam to Davis Ct. 42°20′57″N 71°13′38″W	West Newton	
181	West Parish Burying Ground	West Parish Burying Ground	November 13, 2004 (#04001221)	River and Cherry Sts. 42°21′10″N 71°13′44″W	West Newton	
182	Samuel Wheat House	Samuel Wheat House	September 4, 1986 (#86001895)	399 Waltham St. 42°21′11″N 71°13′29″W	West Newton	
183	Whittemore's Tavern	Whittemore's Tavern	September 4, 1986 (#86001896)	473 Auburn St. 42°20′43″N 71°15′12″W	Auburndale	
184	Windsor Road Historic District	Windsor Road Historic District	February 16, 1990 (#90000018)	Windsor and Kent Rds. 42°19′50″N 71°13′57″W	Waban	
185	Winslow-Haskell Mansion	Winslow-Haskell Mansion	October 25, 1979 (#79000362)	53 Vista Ave. 42°20′24″N 71°14′46″W	Auburndale	
186	Woodland, Newton Highlands, and Newton Centre Railroad Stations, and Baggage and Express Building	Woodland, Newton Highlands, and Newton Centre Railroad Stations, and Baggage and Express Building	June 3, 1976 (#76002137)	1897 Washington St., Auburndale; 18 Station Ave., Newton Highlands; 70 and 50 Union St., Newton Centre; 42°19′21″N 71°12′20″W		A composite historic district of 3 railroad stations and a baggage building
187	John Woodward House	John Woodward House	September 4, 1986 (#86001897)	50 Fairlee Rd. 42°19′21″N 71°13′25″W	Waban	
188	Working Boys Home	Working Boys Home	September 4, 1986 (#86001898)	333 Nahanton St. 42°17′59″N 71°12′17″W	Oak Hill	Now the campus of the Leventhal-Sidman Jewish Community Center.

== Former listings ==
	Name on the Register	Image	Date listed	Date removed	Location	Village	Description
1	Allen Crocker Curtis House-Pillar House	Allen Crocker Curtis House-Pillar House	September 4, 1986 (#86001787)	February 8, 2024	26 Quinobequin Rd. 42°24′04″N 71°19′58″W	Newton Lower Falls	Building was reconstructed in 2005 at new location, then delisted.

== Notes on Zip Codes used ==
- Most villages have their own Zip Codes, but some do not. To further add to the confusion, the Zip Codes do not always coincide with the village boundaries which are "unofficial" according to the city. Most residents, though, seem to know exactly where the village lines are.

The following ZIP Codes are present:

ZIP	Village
02466	Auburndale
02467^{a}	Chestnut Hill
02459	Newton Centre
02458	Newton Corner
02461	Newton Highlands
02462	Newton Lower Falls
02464	Newton Upper Falls
02460	Newtonville
02458^{b}	Nonantum
02459^{c}	Oak Hill
02459^{d}	Thompsonville
02468	Waban
02465	West Newton

^{a} Chestnut Hill Zip Code 02467 extends into Brookline. There are two non-contiguous parts of Newton in this Zip Code but they are joined together by the Brookline part.
^{b} Nonantum does not have its own Zip Code. It uses Newton 02458, which is for Newton Corner. Historic Place listings for Nonantum are assigned to Newton Corner.
^{c} Oak Hill does not have its own Zip Code, It uses Newton 02459, which is for Newton Centre.
^{d} Thompsonville does not have its own Zip Code. It uses Newton 02459 from Newton Centre (or Center), but it also on the border of Chestnut Hill Newton. No listings have been determined to be in Thompsonville, but it is possible that one or more Newton Centre listings may actually be in Thompsonville.

== See also ==
- National Register of Historic Places listings in Middlesex County, Massachusetts
- List of National Historic Landmarks in Massachusetts
