= Eleazer Hyde House =

Historic house in Massachusetts, United States

- U.S. National Register of Historic Places
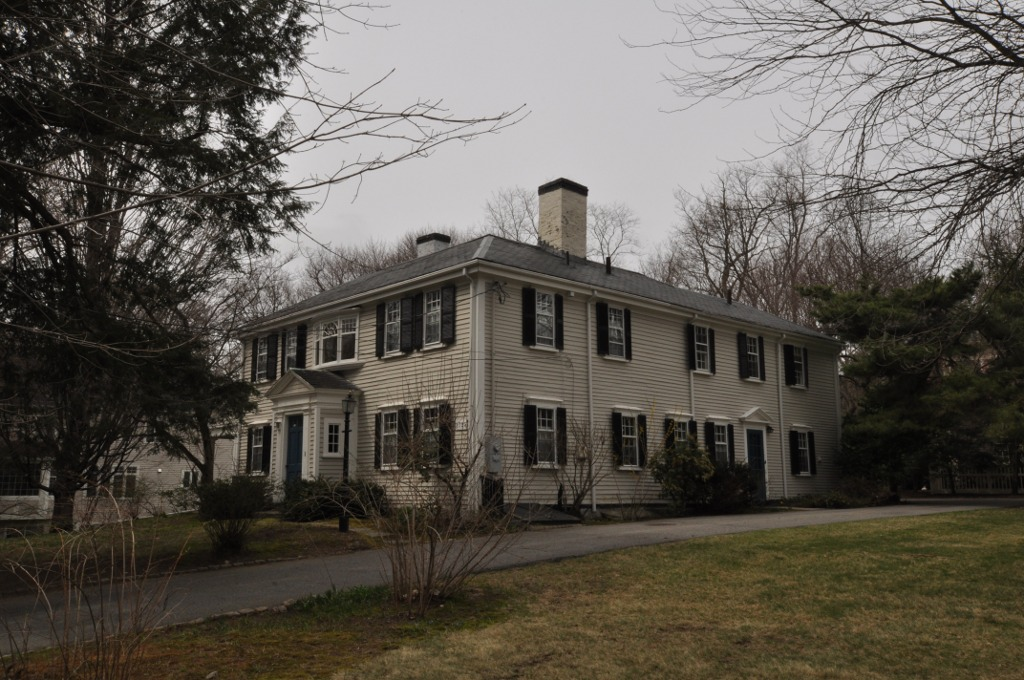

- Location within Massachusetts Location within the United States
- Location: 401 Woodward St., Newton, Massachusetts
- Coordinates: 42°19′35″N 71°13′38″W
- Area: 1.49 acres (0.60 ha)
- Built: 1770
- Architectural style: Georgian, High Georgian
- MPS: Newton MRA
- NRHP reference No.: 86001839
- Added to NRHP: September 04, 1986

The Eleazer Hyde House is a historic house located at 401 Woodward Street in Newton, Massachusetts.

== Description and history ==
The two story timber-frame house was built c. 1770, and is one of the city's few surviving high style Late Georgian houses. This house was probably built by Eleazer Hyde, Jr., son of one of Newton's early settlers. Its entry is framed by pilasters and topped by a gable pediment. Its lower windows are topped by crown moulding, while its upper windows butt up to the roof cornice. The building was enlarged twice in the later years of the 19th century, but retained its Georgian style.

The house was listed on the National Register of Historic Places on September 4, 1986.

== See also ==
- National Register of Historic Places listings in Newton, Massachusetts
