= Samuel Wheat House =

Historic house in Massachusetts, United States

- U.S. National Register of Historic Places
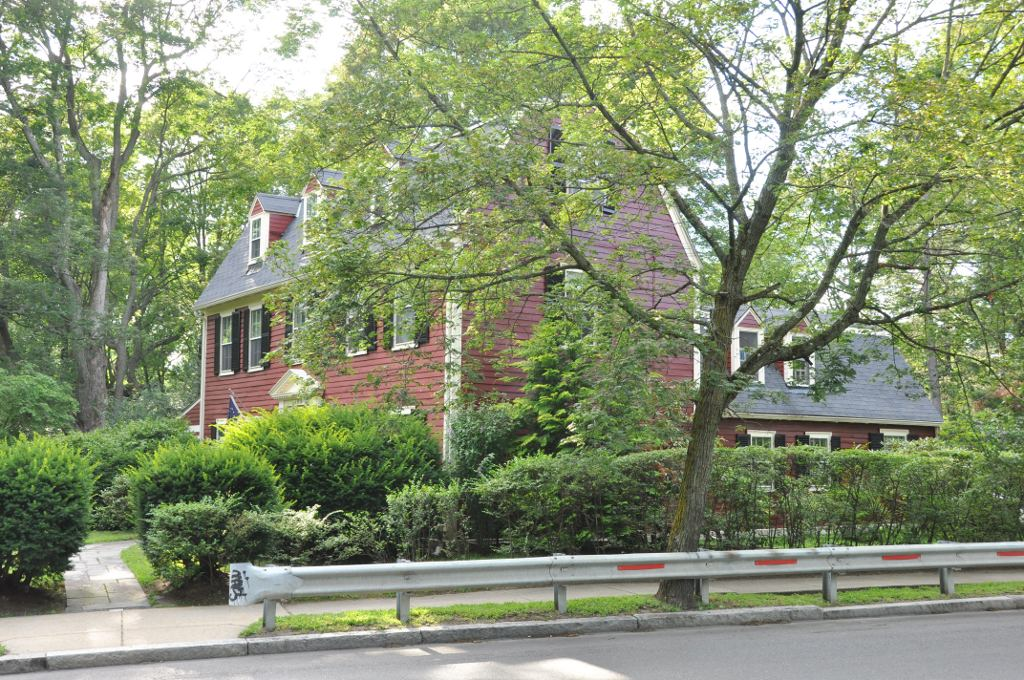

- Location within Massachusetts Location within the United States
- Location: 399 Waltham St., Newton, Massachusetts
- Coordinates: 42°21′12.8″N 71°13′27.0″W
- Built: 1735
- Architectural style: Georgian
- MPS: Newton MRA
- NRHP reference No.: 86001895
- Added to NRHP: September 04, 1986

The Samuel Wheat House is a historic house at 399 Waltham Street in Newton, Massachusetts. It is a 2 1/2-story timber-frame house, five bays wide, with a gambrel roof and clapboard siding. The front entrance is flanked by pilasters and topped by a gabled pediment. The house was built c. 1735, probably for Dr. Samuel Wheat, Jr, and is one of the oldest houses in the city. It was probably built with the gambrel roof, but the dormers are a 19th-century addition.

The house was listed on the National Register of Historic Places in 1986.

== See also ==
- National Register of Historic Places listings in Newton, Massachusetts
