= William F. Kessler House =

Historic house in Massachusetts, United States

- U.S. National Register of Historic Places
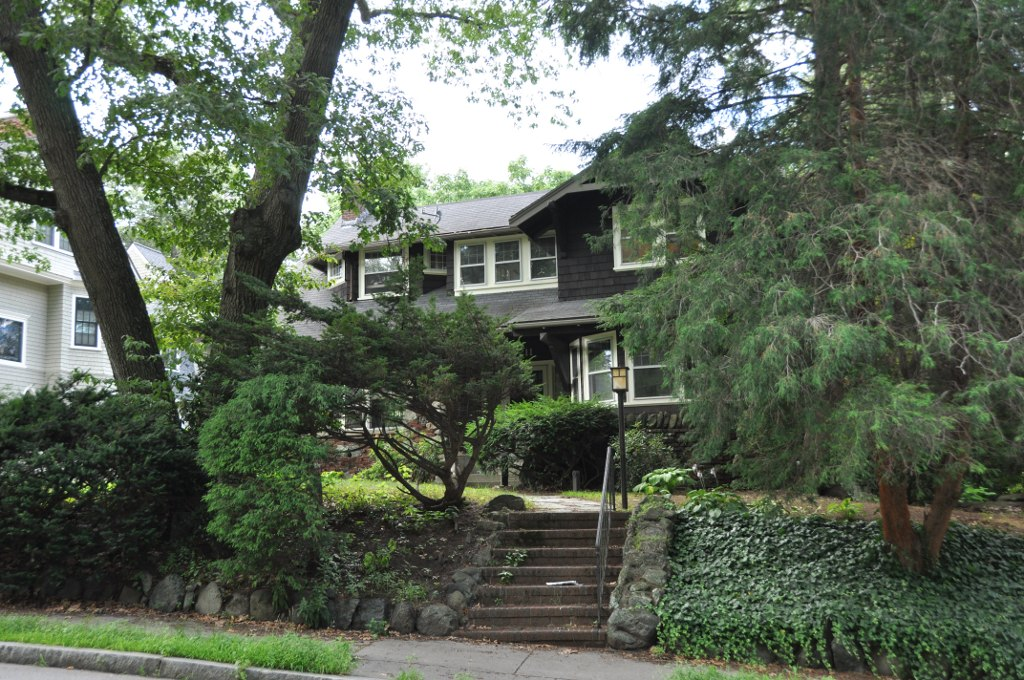

- Location within Massachusetts Location within the United States
- Location: 211 Highland St., Newton, Massachusetts
- Coordinates: 42°20′52″N 71°13′1″W
- Built: 1913
- Architectural style: Bungalow/Craftsman
- MPS: Newton MRA
- NRHP reference No.: 90000048
- Added to NRHP: February 16, 1990

The William F. Kessler House is a historic house at 211 Highland Street in Newton, Massachusetts. Built in 1913, the 1 1/2-story wood-frame house is a poignant example of rustic Craftsman styling. The front roof slopes down to form a porch, which is supported by brick and fieldstone piers. The roofline is pierced by a multi-section dormer with varying window size, shapes, and roof lines. The house was built as infill in an already-developed part of West Newton Hill by Frank Kneeland, a local builder. William Kessler was a salesman.

The house was listed on the National Register of Historic Places in 1990.

== See also ==
- National Register of Historic Places listings in Newton, Massachusetts
