= Newton Centre, Massachusetts =

- Village
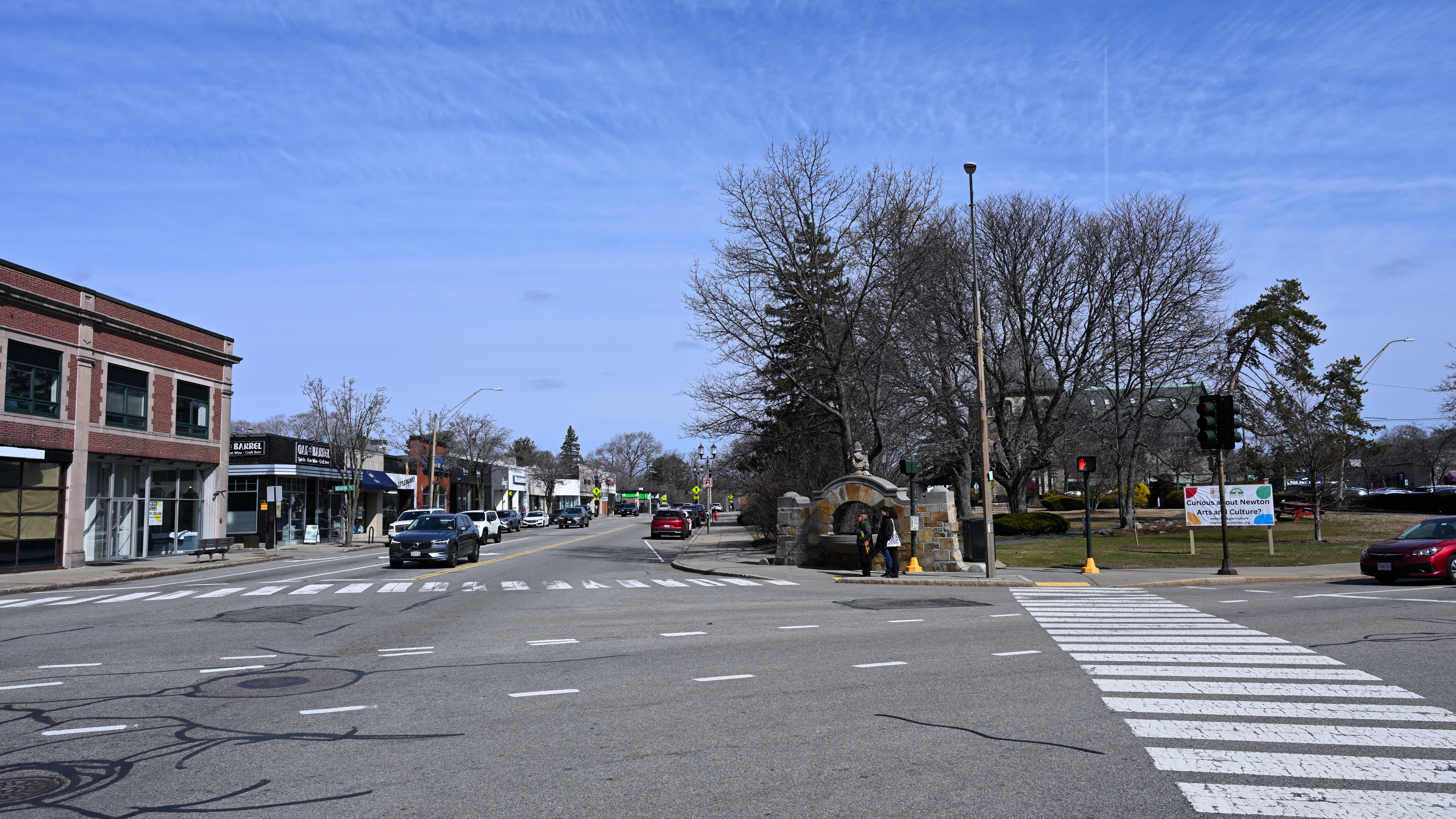
- The intersection of Beacon and Centre Streets, with Newton Centre Green on the right

- Location within Greater Boston area Location within Massachusetts
- Country: United States
- State: Massachusetts
- County: Middlesex
- City: Newton
- Elevation: 300 ft (91 m)
- Time zone: UTC-5 (Eastern (EST))
  - Summer (DST): UTC-4 (EDT)
- ZIP Code: 02459
- Area codes: 617 and 857

Newton Centre is one of the thirteen villages within the city of Newton in Middlesex County, Massachusetts, United States. The main commercial center of Newton Centre is a triangular area surrounding the intersections of Beacon Street, Centre Street, and Langley Road. It is the largest downtown area among all the villages of Newton, and serves as a large upscale shopping destination for the western suburbs of Boston. The Newton City Hall and War Memorial is located at 1000 Commonwealth Avenue, and the Newton Free Library is located at 330 Homer Street in Newton Centre. The Newton Centre station of the MBTA Green Line "D" branch is located on Union Street.

The Crystal Lake and Pleasant Street Historic District is roughly bounded by the Sudbury Aqueduct, Pleasant Avenue, Lake Avenue, and Crystal Street and Webster Court. This area and its surrounding neighborhoods exemplify the distinct styles of the late 19th century and early 20th century.

Crystal Lake, a 33-acre natural lake, is a popular swimming spot for locals in the area.

== Education ==
=== K-12 Education ===
- The Wellan Montessori School is a private school located at 80 Crescent Street in Newton Centre.
- Mason-Rice Elementary School is a public elementary school operated by Newton Public Schools located at 149 Pleasant Street.
- The Newton Country Day School of the Sacred Heart is a private, all-girls Roman Catholic high school and middle school located on the Loren Towle Estate off Centre Street.
- Mt. Alvernia High School is a private, all-girls high school located at 790 Centre Street.

=== Colleges and universities ===
- The Boston College Law School campus, which includes undergraduate housing, is located on Centre Street at the Newton Centre-Newton Corner line.
- Andover Newton Theological School, now the Andover Newton Seminary, is a private graduate institution associated with the Yale Divinity School located on Herrick Rd.
- Hebrew College is also located on Herrick Road in Newton Centre.

== Notable people ==
- Loraine Campbell, American birth control right activist
- William Ryan, psychologist and author of 'Blaming the victim' (1972, 1976).

== Attractions and landmarks ==
=== Buildings (excluding houses) ===
- Boston Edison Power Station, 374 Homer St.
- Colby Hall, 141 Herrick Rd; part of the Andover Newton Theological School.
- First Baptist Church in Newton, 848 Beacon St.
- Newton Centre Branch Library, 1924 Centre St.
- Newton City Hall and War Memorial, 1000 Commonwealth Ave. The city hall is still here today.
- Weeks Junior High School, 7 Hereward Rd.

=== Historic houses ===
- Brackett House
- William L. Church House
- Adams Claflin House
- Capt. Edward Durant House
- Jos. Gunderson House
- John Harbach House
- Henry I. Harriman House
- C. Lewis Harrison House
- House at 1008 Beacon Street
- House at 173–175 Ward Street
- House at 215 Brookline Street
- House at 729 Dedham Street
- Gershom Hyde House
- Jackson House
- King House
- Kistler House
- Mount Pleasant
- Edward Parsons House
- Prescott Estate
- James Lorin Richards House
- Frank H. Stewart House
- Edward B. Stratton House

=== Historic districts ===
- Crystal Lake and Pleasant Street Historic District
- Gray Cliff Historic District
- Monadnock Road Historic District
- Morton Road Historic District
- Newton Theological Institution Historic District
- Sumner and Gibbs Streets Historic District
- Union Street Historic District

== Historic pictorial map ==
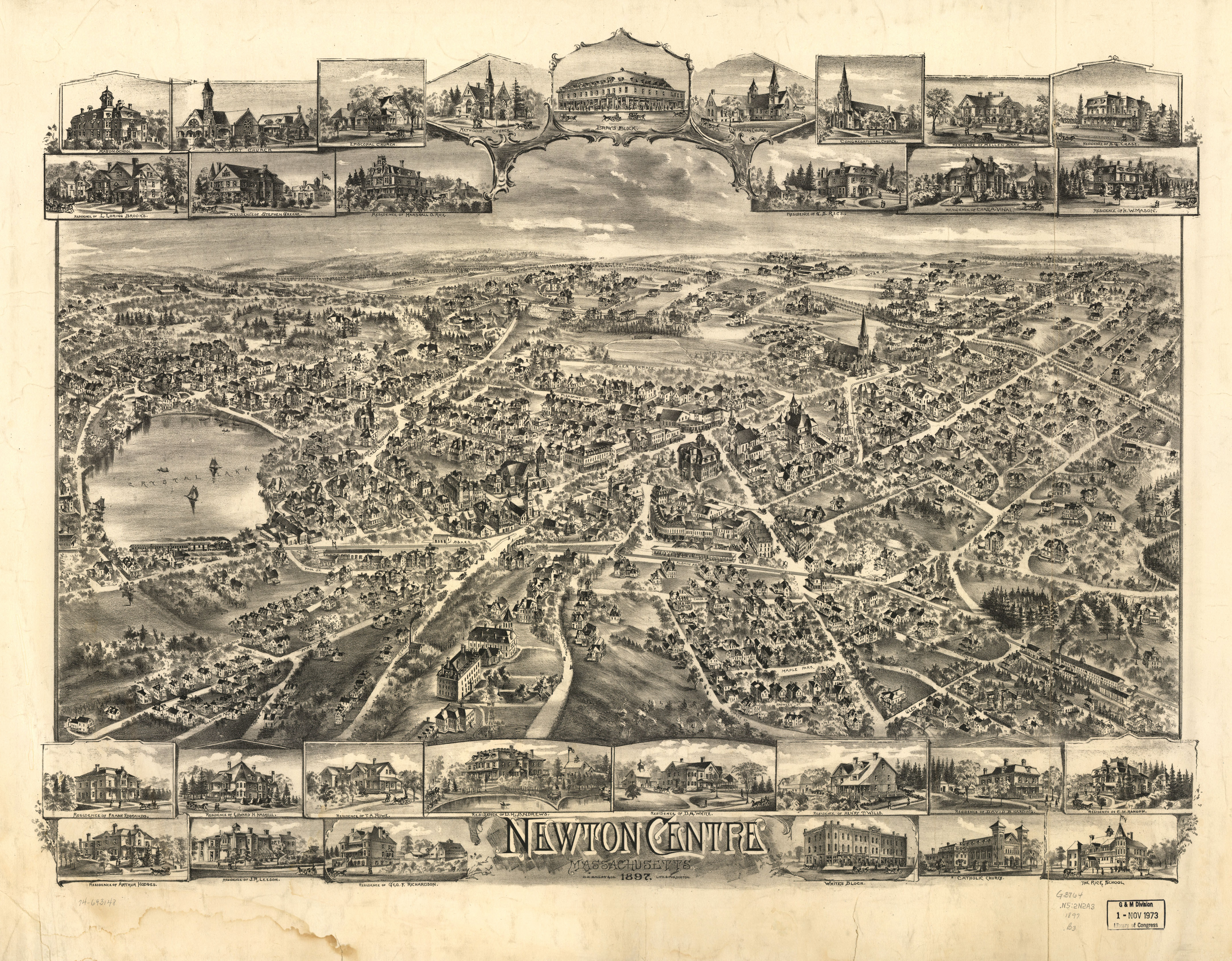
1897 Newton Centre bird's eye view

== See also ==
- Newton Centre station
- List of Registered Historic Places in Newton, Massachusetts
