= Thompsonville, Massachusetts =

- Village
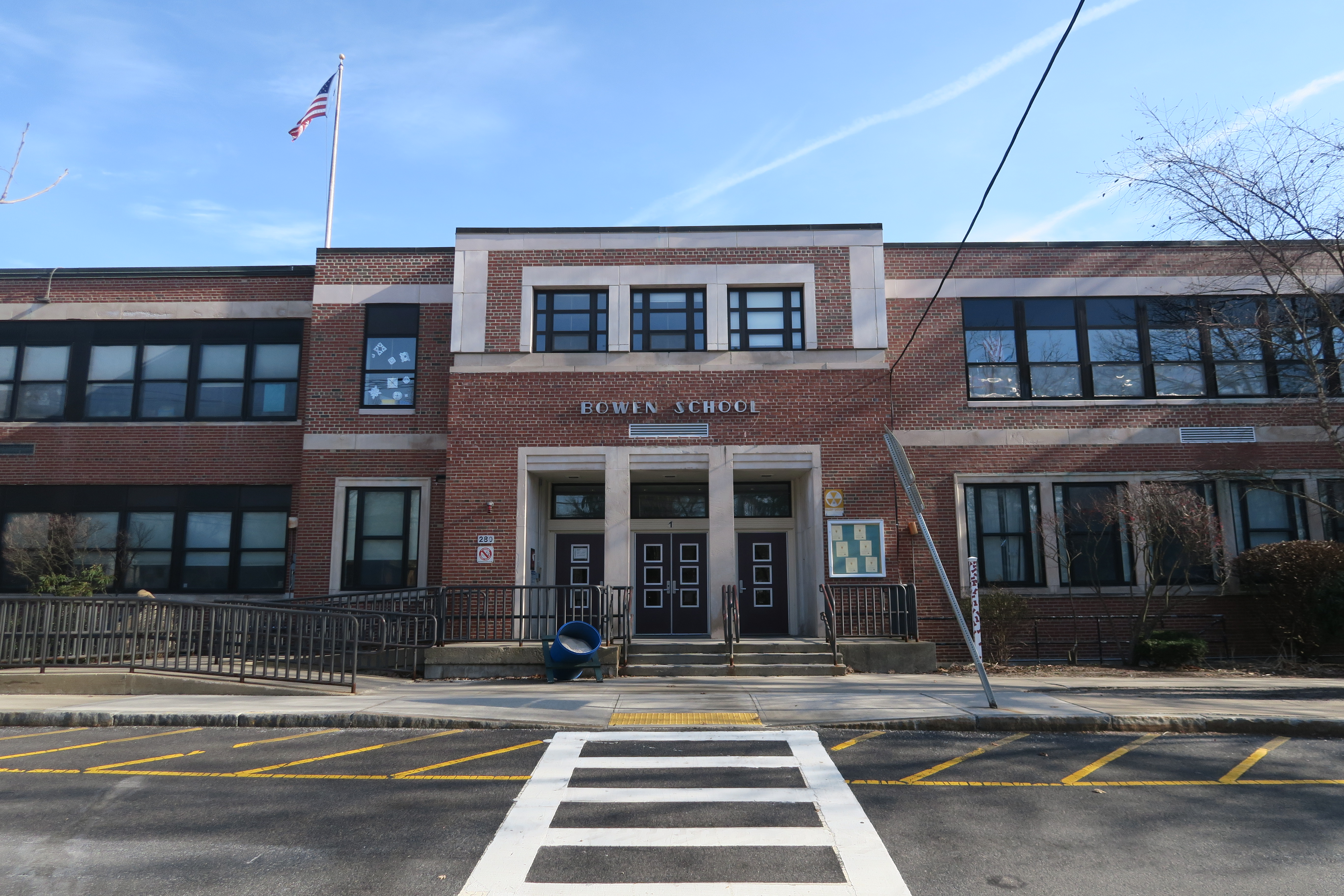
- Bowen School

- Location within Greater Boston area Location within Massachusetts Location within the United States
- Coordinates: 42°18′55″N 71°11′03″W
- Country: United States
- State: Massachusetts
- County: Middlesex
- City: Newton
- Time zone: UTC-5 (Eastern (EST))
  - Summer (DST): UTC-4 (EDT)

Thompsonville is one of the thirteen villages within the city of Newton in Middlesex County, Massachusetts, United States. It is located between Newton Centre, Newton Highlands, and Chestnut Hill. As it is within the area of the Newton Public Schools school district, students who live in Thompsonville typically attend Bowen Elementary School, Oak Hill Middle School, and Newton South High School. Thompsonville is one of the lesser known villages in Newton and does not have a village center as most of the other villages do.

Thompsonville has been traditionally centered near the intersection of Jackson Street and Langley Road. It abuts Chestnut Hill.
