= List of villages in Newton, Massachusetts =

The City of Newton, Massachusetts consists of thirteen officially recognized villages. Like most Massachusetts villages, the villages of Newton do not have any legal representation, and exist mostly for cultural reasons. Most Newtonian villages contain a downtown center, a post office, and a unique zip code.

== Recognized ==
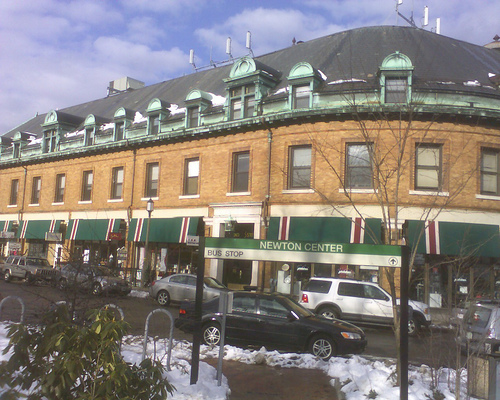
Piccadilly Square and the Newton Centre MBTA Station on Union Street in Newton Centre

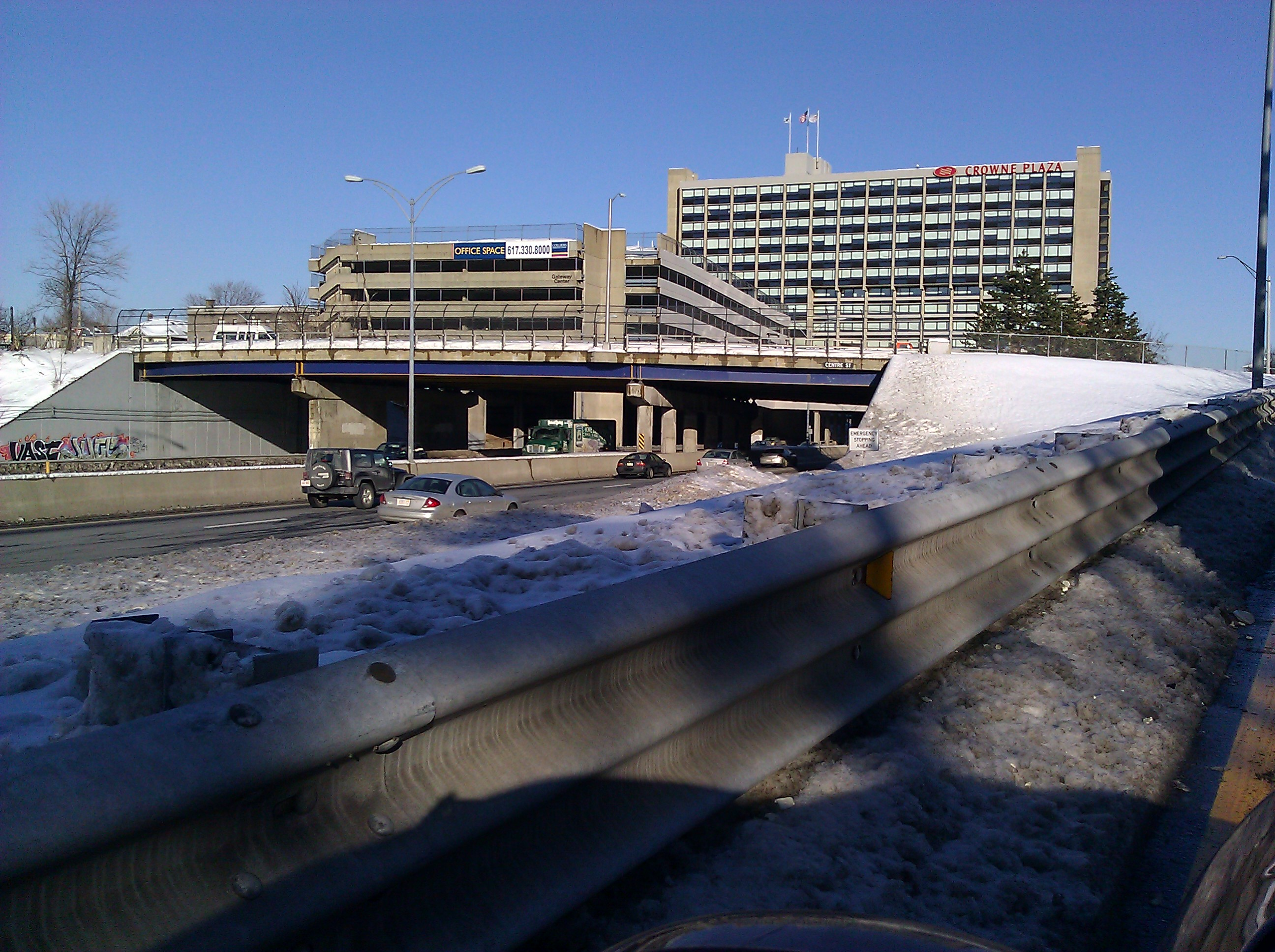
The Crowne Plaza Hotel (now the Four Points Sheraton) in Newton Corner

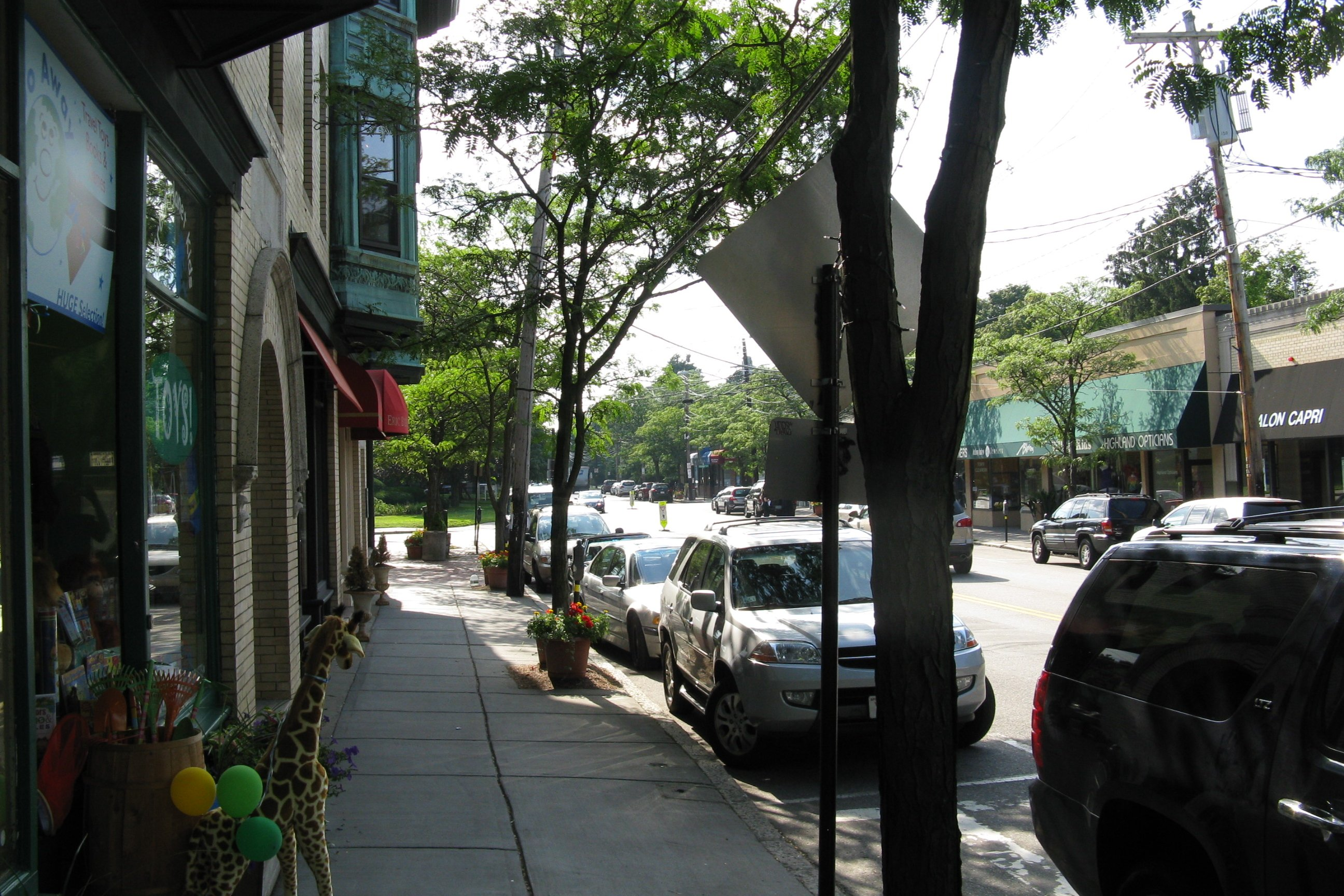
Lincoln St in Newton Highlands

- Auburndale — centered on the intersection of Commonwealth Avenue and Auburn Street
- Chestnut Hill — includes Boston College, and spills over into Boston and Brookline
- Newton Centre — centered on the intersections of Centre Street, Beacon Street and Langley Road
- Newton Corner — centered on the intersection of Centre Street, Washington Street and the Massachusetts Turnpike
- Newton Highlands — centered on the intersections of Centre Street, Walnut Street and Lincoln Street
- Newton Lower Falls — the only Village located largely outside of Massachusetts Route 128
- Newton Upper Falls — centered on the intersection of Eliot Street and Chestnut Street
- Newtonville — centered on the intersection of Walnut Street and Washington Street
- Nonantum — centered on the intersection of Adams Street and Watertown Street
- Oak Hill — the southernmost Village, bisected by Dedham Street
- Thompsonville — centered on the intersection of Boylston Street and Langley Road
- Waban — centered on the intersection of Beacon Street and Woodward Street
- West Newton — centered on the intersections of Chestnut Street, Waltham Street, Watertown Street and Washington Street

== Unofficial ==
- Four Corners — centered on the intersection of Beacon Street and Walnut Street, not always recognized by the City of Newton as an official village
- Oak Hill Park — a residential development sometimes marked as part of Oak Hill but recognized as a village on certain city documents
