= Dai Buell =

American pianist

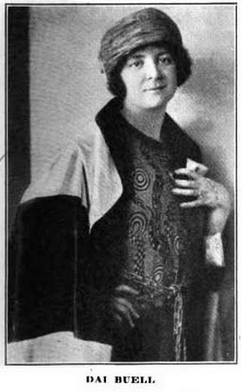
- Buell in 1922
- Born: December 11, 1892; Fort Wayne, Indiana
- Died: July 9, 1939 (aged 46)
- Occupations: Concert pianist; piano teacher
- Known for: Early piano recital and concert broadcasts on radio and television

Dai Buell (December 11, 1892 – July 9, 1939) was an American pianist and teacher. In 1921 she gave the first piano concerts heard by radio audiences and in 1931, she gave the first concert on TV.

== Early life ==
Dai Buell was born in Fort Wayne, Indiana and raised in Logansport.

The story of her early life is an "example of the value of confidence in self, combined with the grit and pluck to back it up". She came from humble beginnings and "lessons were a problem but nothing daunted her", and she paid her own way through music lessons by teaching a class of her own from the age of 14.

She studied piano in Boston under Carl Baermann and Antoinette Szumowska, and had her professional debut in January 1916 in Steinert Hall, Boston. New York and Chicago debuts followed early in 1917. She toured in Europe, giving recitals in London, Paris and towns in Germany, Austria, and Holland. She appeared as a soloist with the Boston Symphony Orchestra several times, including in 1928 of Chopin 'Concerto in F Minor' with Serge Koussevitzky conducting.

While in France to study modern French composition, Miss Buell was a frequent contributor to musical magazines and gave recitals in France. In the U.S. her recitals were works of representative composers of different musical periods which she discussed and analyzed. She was active in Chromatic Club. Her recital advertisements listed the use of the Mason & Hamlin piano and her recording for Ampico and Duo-Art Rolls. As an active member in the MacDowell Club her advanced piano students were presented in weekly recitals in her Aloha bungalow, the William L. Church House in Newton Center, MA for the benefit of the club.

== Career ==
Dai Buell was a concert pianist active in Boston and New York City, with tours abroad in the 1920s. She also gave lectures and wrote about music, and taught piano. "She is imaginative and possesses a well-developed technique, especially in florid passages," one early reviewer noted of Buell, adding "Her stage presence is altogether charming." She played benefit concerts for charities, including a settlement house in Boston and the Consumers' League of Massachusetts.

She predicted that radio was essential for growth & public appreciation of the classics. She urged musicians to meet the changes from concert stage technique to that of radio. On November 2, 1921, at studio of the American Radio & Research Corporation (AMRAD) in Medford Hillside, in Massachusetts, Dai Buell gave a piano recital on station Amrad IXE (Ne5V England over Station WGX) that was broadcast over radio, "the first piano recital by wireless that the world – or at least a goodly part of it – has ever heard," according to the Musical Courier. The listening audience the largest audience was the time was estimated to be over 35,000 and could be heard from coast to coast Canada to Texas. She hoped that the radio broadcast would be "a serious program with remarks to stimulate the uninitiated in music's beauties and it is a pleasant prospect to think that in the future perhaps an artist's tours may be made from their very own music room".

A few weeks later she gave a performance with the young Braggiotti sisters dancing while she played.

In 1924 her performances of several pieces were captured on piano rolls, and can still be heard today. Miss Buell's first recording, on THE AMPICO was "Toccata" by Paradies. There is a discussion of her discography

On October 2, 1931, she gave an epochal broadcast of the world's first complete concert by television. It was a feature to demonstrate the power of television. The transmissions was from by Shortwave and Television Laboratories of Boston, Brookline ave, Eoston, MA. The sound was transmitted by Station WIXAU and the images were transmitted by Station WIXAV.

When asked about her career ambitions, she replied "I hope to play the piano so well as to attract vast audiences. My ambition is to widen the appeal of the pianoforte to American audiences.”

== The Aloha Bungalow ==
Her home in Newton Centre, Massachusetts, called "Aloha Bungalow", at 145 Warren St, was custom built for her by her Uncle a prominent engineer William L. Church House. The house was designed so she could live "the life beautiful" as she was convinced that to make the most of an artistic gift, the artist's daily life should be raised above. The house was built with a soundproof music studio and a small art gallery.

The walls, floors and ceilings were insulated with seaweed for sound acoustics and insulation. It featured a music studio which was "so ingeniously constructed that one can play on the piano and still not be heard in other portions of the house". It was called the "soundless music room" in several articles. The center of the house featured a music room with a sunken floor giving it a height of 27 feet, forming a covered gallery 14 feet above the floor which was used during the weekly musical concerts held at the Aloha Bungalow.

Her house became known in music circles and was featured in advertisements for Steinway Pianos' including in the Boston Symphony Orchestra concert programs, Season 57,1937-1938. The advert stated "Steinway, the instrument of the immortals. used exclusively by DAI BUELL ..at ALOHA BUNGALOW in a SCHUMANN Programme March 15 and 16 and in a programme of BACH and SOME OTHER MODERNS on April 12 and 13, at ALOHA BUNGALOW.

== Personal life ==
Dai Buell married Navy man Audley Earl Greenidge during World War I, but their union was a secret until 1924. She died suddenly in 1939 of heart trouble.

== May Days ==
She famously held annual May Day celebrations at the "Aloha Bungalow" at 145 Warren Street, Newton Centre, which according to a local newspaper were "those delightful "May Days” which for many years were a tradition in musical circles."

Annually on May 1, she would keep open house and arrange a program of dancing and music lasting well into the evening. As a very young girl, she set apart this day for her friends and maintained the practice unless away on concert tours. The May Day event included "traditional folk dances, and a Maypole dance followed by several musical selections by artists of distinction"

== Her campaign for careers of married women ==
She married Audley Earl Greenridge in 1918 but kept her secret for six years as he was an ensign in the Navy. She could "look back upon this six years of privacy with infinite satisfaction” and strongly berated the public who found the music of a married female pianist less appealing. She stated that "opportunities for success” were fewer for married women and remarked that well-known successful artists tended to get married "after success was theirs". She recognized that "the public doesn't "give a rap" whether a young man artist is or isn't married." She campaigned against "an Inherited attitude that has come down the centuries" and “merrily chanted, I've proved it's absurd... I hope they'll learn that marriage adds rather than detracts from an artist's powers". In a Boston Globe article in 1924
