= Buff's Pub =

Sports bar in Newton, Massachusetts, U.S.

- Interactive map of Buff's Pub

Restaurant information
- Established: 1976 (50 years ago)
- Owner: Don Fabrizio
- Location: 317 Washington Street, Newton Corner, Suffolk County, Massachusetts, 02458, United States
- Coordinates: 42.35715445°N 71.18646369°W
- Website: www.buffspub.com

Buff's Pub is a sports bar located at 317 Washington Street in Newton Corner, Massachusetts, United States. Established in 1976 by Don Fabrizio, it has won several awards for its chicken wings. The pub is named for Buff, a buffalo whose head is mounted on the wall to the right of the bar.

Buff's Pub has won Boston magazine's "Best of Boston" Best Wings award and The Improper Bostonian's "Boston's Best" award, also for its wings. Thrillist, meanwhile, named Buff's Pub in its list of the top eight wings establishments in Boston, referring to it as the "undisputed master."

Every Thursday, members of the offensive line of the Boston College Eagles football team visit Buff's in an attempt to eat one hundred wings. Tuukka Rask, the Finnish former goaltender for the Boston Bruins, is also a regular patron.

The building in which Buff's Pub is located was built in 1998, the year the pub's current food and beverage manager, Dave Morrissey, began in the role.

Don Fabrizio died in 2024, aged 73.
