= House at 60 William Street =

Historic house in Massachusetts, United States

- U.S. National Register of Historic Places
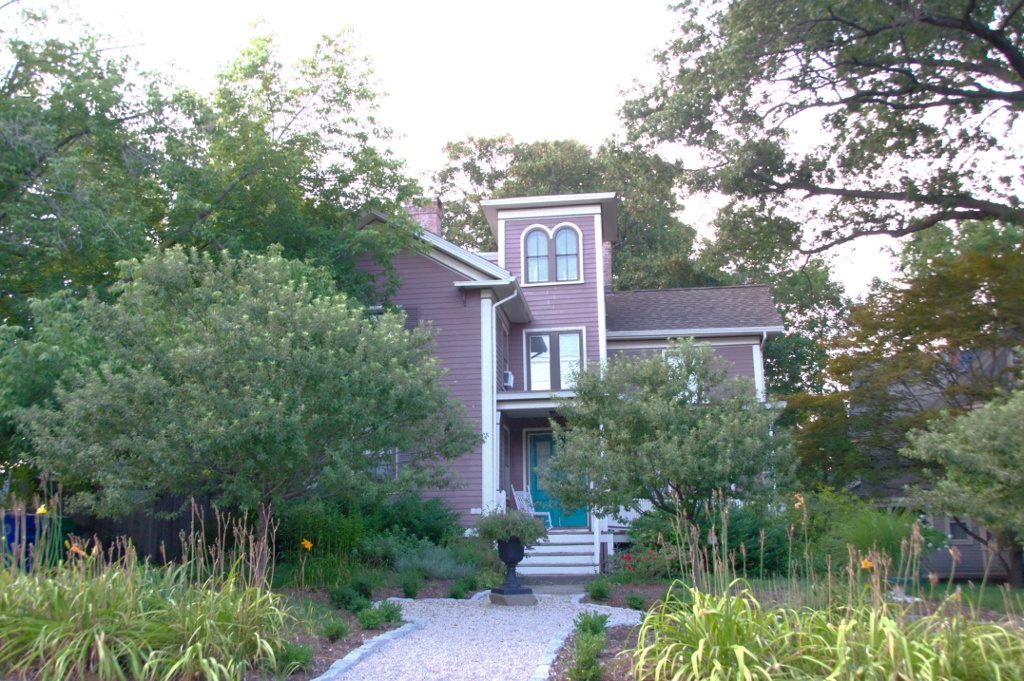

- Location within Massachusetts Location within the United States
- Location: 19 Jefferson St., Newton, Massachusetts
- Coordinates: 42°21′33.53″N 71°10′58.02″W
- Built: 1850
- Architectural style: Italianate, Italian Villa
- MPS: Newton MRA
- NRHP reference No.: 86001833
- Added to NRHP: September 04, 1986

House at 60 William Street is a historic house at 19 Jefferson Street in the Newton Corner village of Newton, Massachusetts. It is listed at 60 William Street in Massachusetts cultural inventory and National Register listings. Built in 1850, it is a well-preserved example of a modest Italianate wood-frame house. It is a 2 1/2-story wood-frame building, with an L-shaped layout that has a three-story tower at the crook of the L. Italianate styling includes the tower's shallow-pitch hip roof, and paired round-arch windows on its top level.

The house was listed on the National Register of Historic Places in 1986.

== See also ==
- National Register of Historic Places listings in Newton, Massachusetts
