= Rawson Estate =

Historic house in Massachusetts, United States

- U.S. National Register of Historic Places
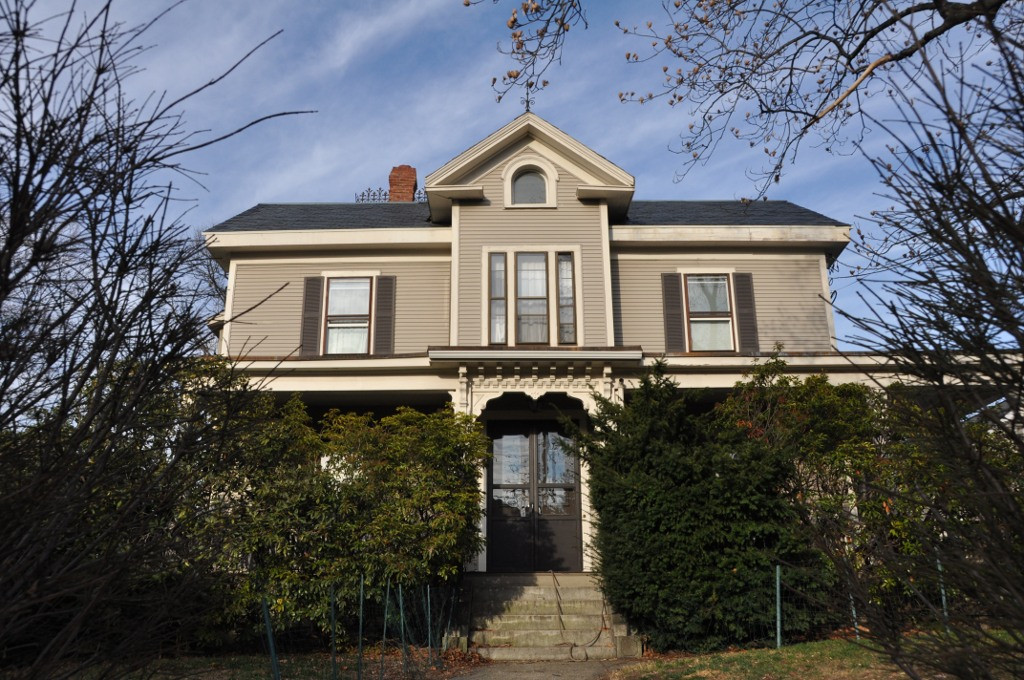

- Location within Massachusetts Location within the United States
- Location: 41 Vernon St., Newton, Massachusetts
- Coordinates: 42°21′16″N 71°10′55″W
- Built: 1860
- Architectural style: Italianate
- MPS: Newton MRA
- NRHP reference No.: 86001869
- Added to NRHP: September 04, 1986

The Rawson Estate is a historic estate house at 41 Vernon Street in Newton, Massachusetts. The 2 1/2-story wood-frame house was built c. 1860, and is a well-preserved surviving specimen of an Italianate estate house, a form which was once more common in the Newton Corner area. It has a symmetrical appearance, with a projecting central section with a gable in which a round-arch window is set. The front porch has ornate decorative wood trim. The house was built by Daniel Rawson, a boot and shoe merchant, and was once part of a much larger landholding of the Rawsons.

The house was listed on the National Register of Historic Places in 1986.

== See also ==
- National Register of Historic Places listings in Newton, Massachusetts
