= Mount Pleasant (Newton, Massachusetts) =

Historic house in Massachusetts, United States

- U.S. National Register of Historic Places
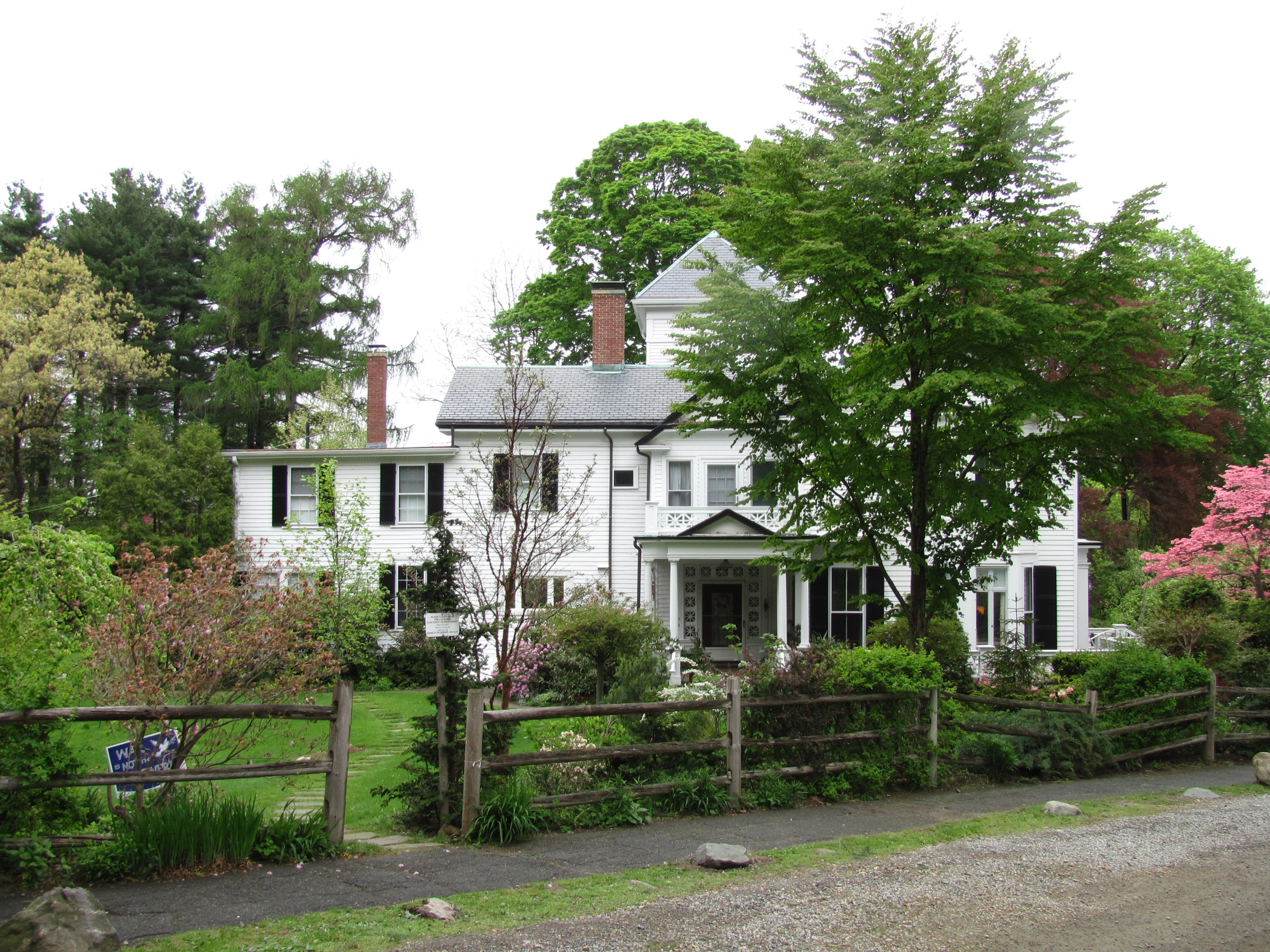
- Mount Pleasant

- Location within Massachusetts Location within the United States
- Location: 15 Bracebridge Rd., Newton, Massachusetts
- Coordinates: 42°19′53″N 71°12′8″W
- Built: 1856
- Architectural style: Italianate
- MPS: Newton MRA
- NRHP reference No.: 86001851
- Added to NRHP: September 04, 1986

Mount Pleasant is a historic two-story wood frame estate house in Newton Centre, Massachusetts, built circa 1856. It is a well-preserved example of the academic Italianate style of architecture, with a three-bay facade and hip roof with a small gable over the centered entry, and a three-story turret. The house was listed on the National Register of Historic Places in 1986.

The Mount Pleasant house was built for Roswell Turner, a major land owner and real estate developer in the Newton Centre area. The house and surrounding property were owned for many of the later years of the 19th century and early years of the 20th century by Charles S. Davis, another major force in the development of Newton Centre. Under Davis's ownership, much of the original estate was split off for other houses and streets to be built, while the original Mount Pleasant house remained. By 1917, Mr. Addison C. Burnham owned the house and was calling his smaller property "Jolly's Hollow". Subsequent owners continued to call it "Jolly's Hollow", at least into 2018.

In January 1997, the Wilson family, owners of Jolly's Hollow/Mount Pleasant, donated 0.5 acres of the wooded portion of their property to the City of Newton for the creation of the Wilson Conservation Area. In 2012, the Wilsons donated to the Newton Conservators a conservation restriction to preserve an additional 1.5 acres of their land. This conservation land, as intended, adds a link to a popular walking trail that connects a playground, elementary school, and park nearby, and also to suburbs to the west. The walking trail is on top of the underground Cochituate and Sudbury Aqueducts (built in 1848 and 1878, respectively, to supply water to Boston and nearby municipalities). The Mount Pleasant house happens to be situated right between the two aqueducts, which both have easements under the Jolly's Hollow property.

The Wilsons sold the house and property in July 2018 to the Fiete family, having originally purchased it from the Scribner family in March 1966.

== See also ==
- National Register of Historic Places listings in Newton, Massachusetts
