= House at 1008 Beacon Street =

Historic house in Massachusetts, United States

- U.S. National Register of Historic Places
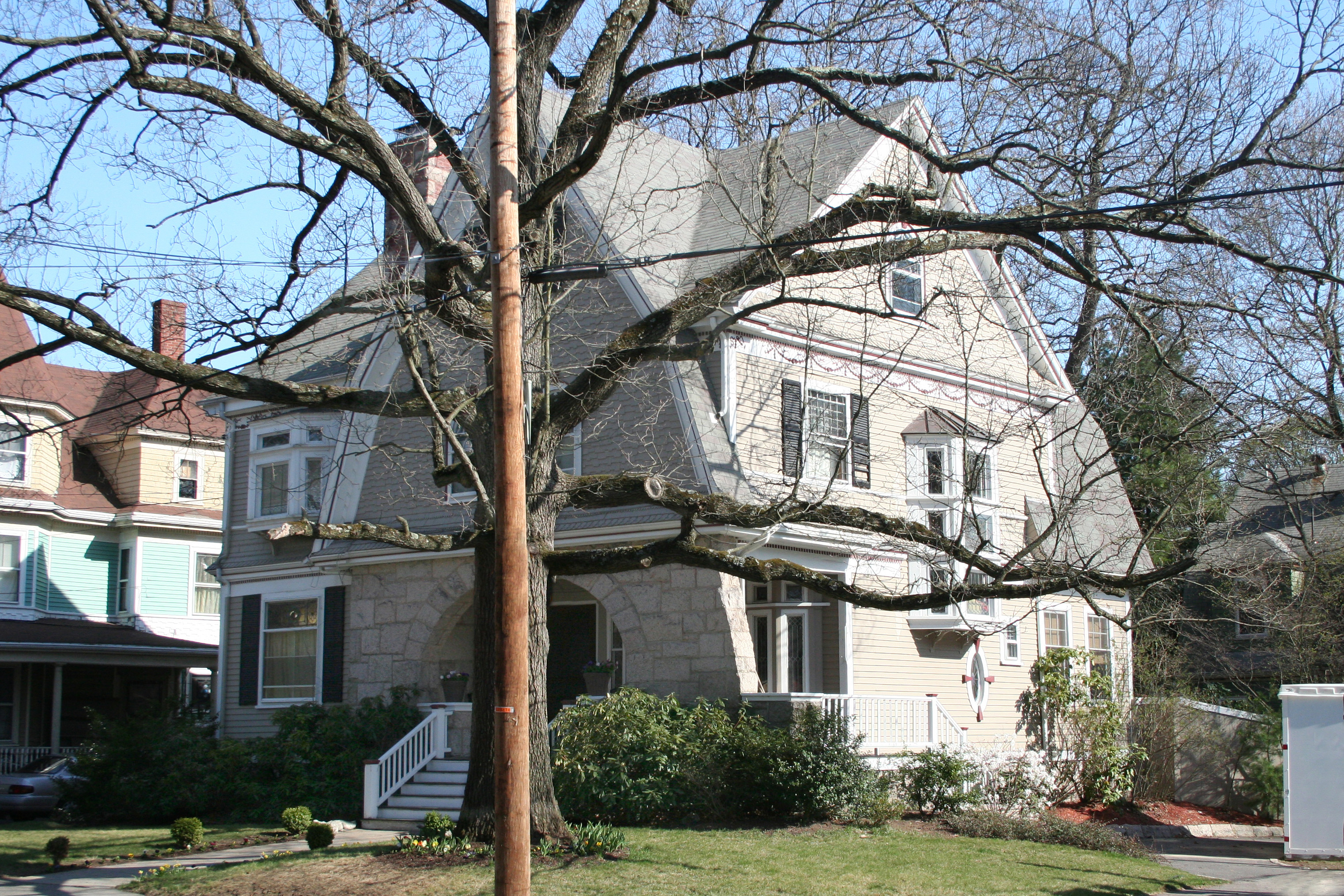

- Location within Massachusetts Location within the United States
- Location: 1008 Beacon St., Newton, Massachusetts
- Coordinates: 42°19′48″N 71°12′13″W
- Area: less than one acre
- Built: 1897
- Architectural style: Colonial Revival, Shingle Style
- MPS: Newton MRA
- NRHP reference No.: 86001813
- Added to NRHP: September 04, 1986

1008 Beacon Street is a historic house in the Newton Centre neighborhood of Newton, Massachusetts. Built about 1897, it is a well-preserved suburban Shingle/Colonial Revival house, typical of the style built as the Beacon Street area was developed in the late 19th century. It was listed on the National Register of Historic Places in 1986.

== Description and history ==
1008 Beacon Street is located west of the village center of Newton Centre, on the south side Beacon Street at its junction with Newbury Street. Beacon Street is a major east–west route in the city, connecting Newton Centre to Waban. The house is a 2 1/2-story wood-frame structure, with a cross-gabled roof and shingled exterior. The main roof is a side-facing gable, but is crossed by large gambrel sections on both front and rear faces. The front gambrel projects over a recessed porch which is made of dressed stone, with a round Syrian arch providing access. The gambrel is finished in decorative cut shingling, and has two round-arch windows in its lower level and a small sash window near its peak. To the left of the gambrel is a two-pane fixed-pane window with a stained-glass transom above on the first floor, and a projecting oriel window on the second. A chimney rises through the roof, made of brick with fieldstone quoining. The gable frieze on the side-facing gable is decorated with applied garland swags.

The Beacon Street area west of Newton Centre was developed in the late 19th century as a fashionable suburb with high-quality, often architect-designed, houses for the upper middle class. The land this house was built on belonged to a prominent local developed, Charles Davis, as late as 1895. The quality of its design and construction suggest that it was designed by an architect, and not built on speculation. Its first owner Joseph Barrows, only lived there a short time; its second owner, Christopher Goddard, as an insurance broker working in Boston.

== See also ==
- National Register of Historic Places listings in Newton, Massachusetts
