= Brackett House (Newton, Massachusetts) =

Historic house in Massachusetts, United States

- U.S. National Register of Historic Places
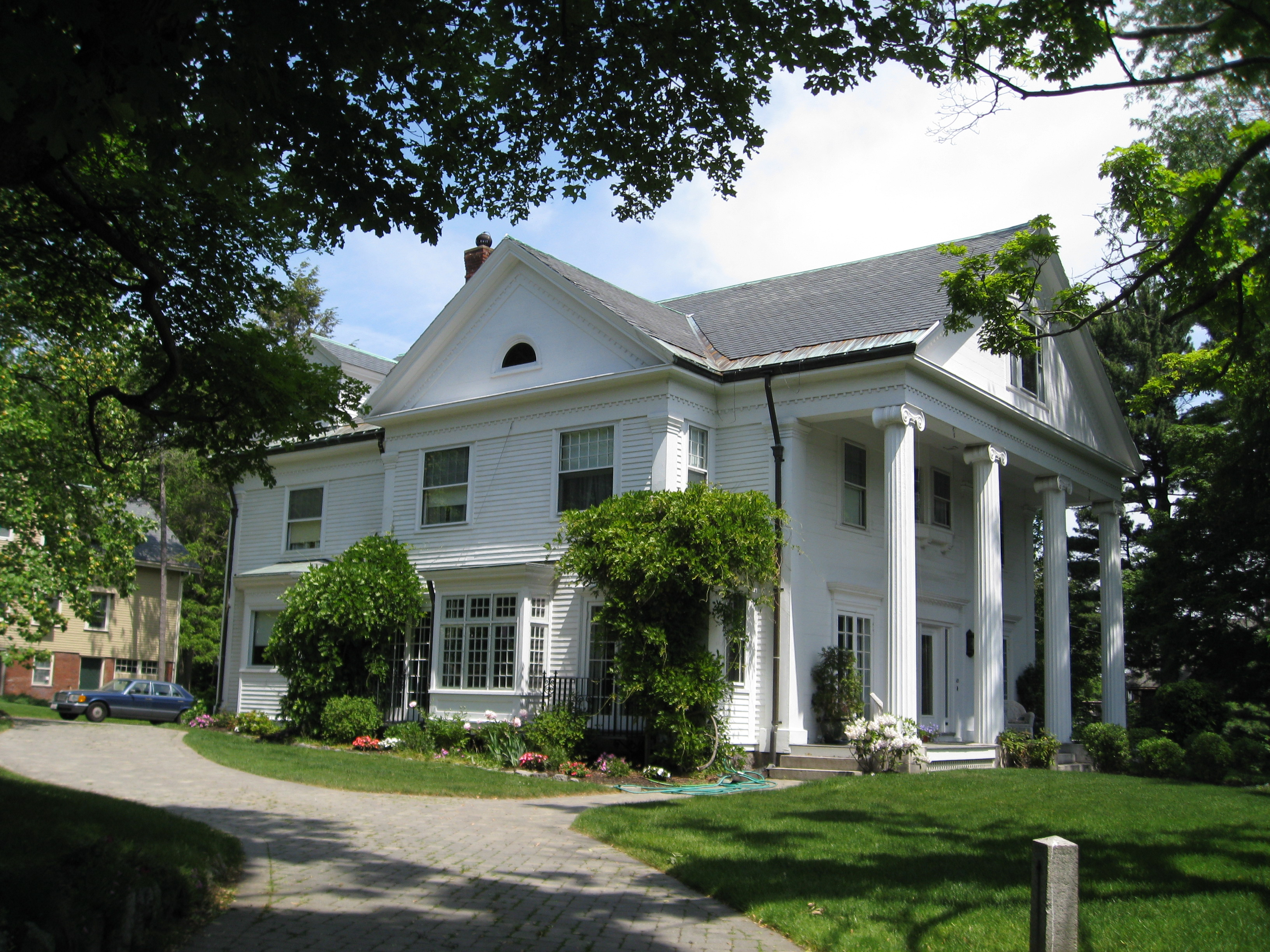

- Location within Massachusetts Location within the United States
- Location: 621 Centre Street, Newton Centre, Massachusetts
- Coordinates: 42°20′59.96″N 71°11′11.72″W
- Area: 1.2 acres (0.49 ha)
- Built: c. 1844
- NRHP reference No.: 86001777
- Added to NRHP: October 4, 1986

The Brackett House is an historic house located at 621 Centre Street in the Newton Centre village of Newton, Massachusetts. Built about 1844, it is a prominent local example of Greek Revival architecture, with a four-column temple front. Extensively damaged by fire in 2010, a careful restoration was completed in 2013. It was listed on the National Register of Historic Places on October 4, 1986.

== Description and history ==
The Brackett House is located in a residential area south of Newton Corner, at the northwest corner of Centre and Bellevue Streets. Centre Street is a historically old road, and is now a busy artery between Newton Corner and Newton Centre to the south. The house is 2 1/2 stories in height, with a gabled roof and clapboarded exterior. It is fronted by a monumental two-story Greek temple portico supported by four fluted Ionic columns. The main entrance is at the center of the three-bay facade, flanked by sidelight windows and topped by an architrave with cornice. A cross-gabled section projects on the south side of the building, with a fully pedimented gable that has a half-round window at its center.

The area where the house stands was originally allocated to Deacon Samuel Hyde, who was one of Newton's first settlers, arriving in 1639. Hyde and his brother laid out Centre Street. By the 1840s the property was farmland owned by Nathaniel Brackett. The house was probably built in 1844, the year Nathaniel's son Gilman married Catherine Russell. The house was extensively damaged by fire on March 20, 2010, and subsequently underwent a careful restoration which was completed in 2013.

== See also ==
- National Register of Historic Places listings in Newton, Massachusetts
