= Sumner and Gibbs Streets Historic District =

Historic district in Massachusetts, United States

- U.S. National Register of Historic Places
- U.S. Historic district
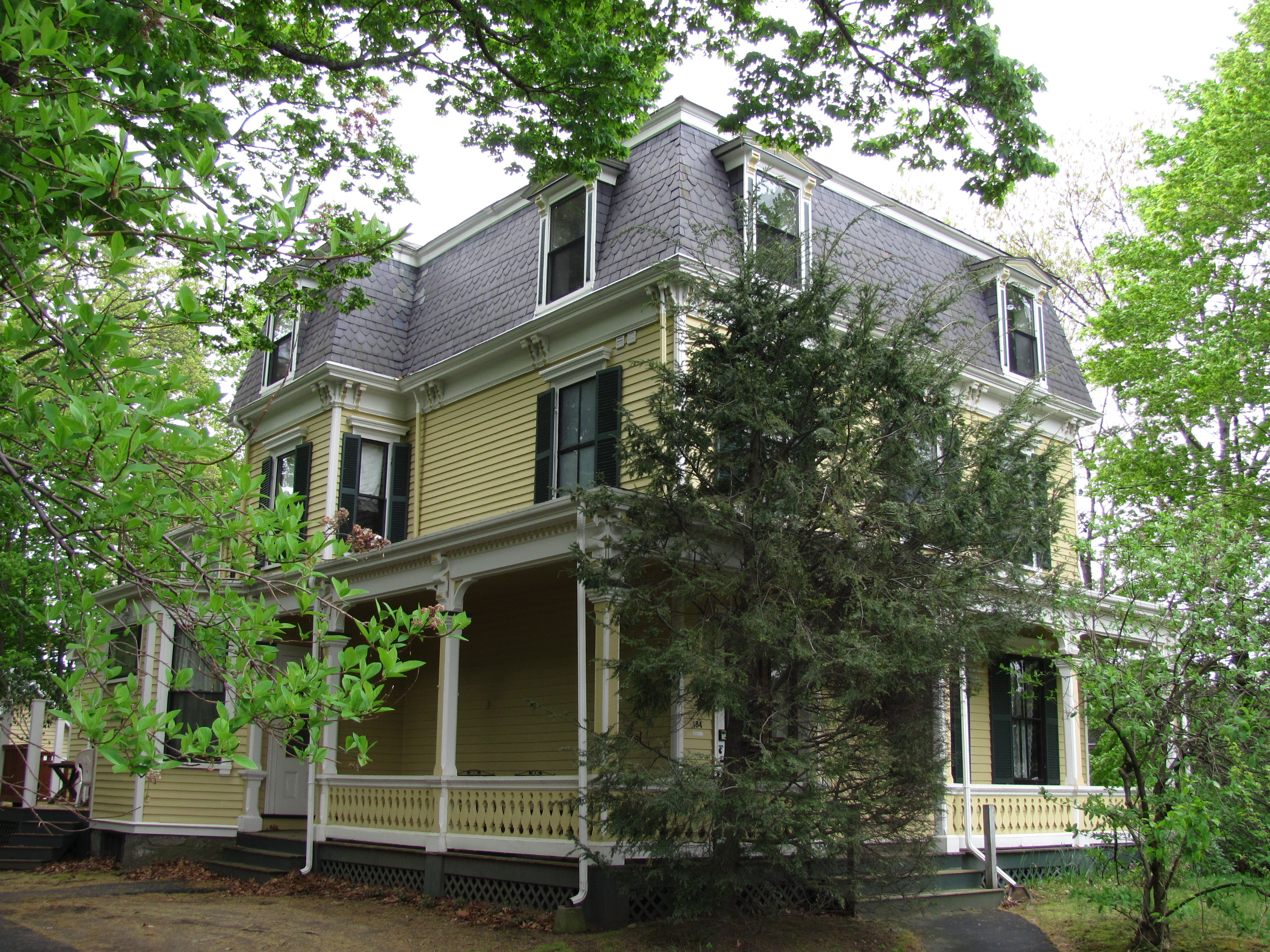
- 184 Gibbs Street

- Location within Massachusetts Location within the United States
- Location: Roughly Sumner St. between Willow St. and Cotswold Terr. and 184 Gibbs St., Newton, Massachusetts
- Coordinates: 42°20′0″N 71°11′32″W
- Architectural style: Colonial Revival, Second Empire, Queen Anne
- MPS: Newton MRA
- NRHP reference No.: 86001762
- Added to NRHP: September 04, 1986

The Sumner and Gibbs Streets Historic District is a residential historic district encompassing a cohesive collection of houses representing styles common in the Newton Centre area of Newton, Massachusetts during its first period of growth. It includes houses along Sumner Street, between Cotswold Terrace and Willow Street, and the adjacent house at 184 Gibbs Street. The houses were built between 1865 and 1899, and are predominantly in the Queen Anne and Colonial Revival styles. The district was listed on the National Register of Historic Places in 1986.

== Description and history ==
Sumner Street is a residential street running north-south between Willow and Ward Streets in central Newton, just north of the main village of Newton Centre, one of 11 villages in Newton. This district encompasses roughly the southern third of the street, as well as a single house west of Sumner on Gibbs Street, which bisects the district. Development of this area was spurred by the improvement of rail service in Newton brought by the introduction of the Circuit Railroad in 1886, and further intensified by the construction of Commonwealth Avenue, crosses Sumner Street north of the district.

The district contains sixteen houses built between 1865 and 1899. The oldest house in the district is 184 Gibbs Street, a high-quality example Second Empire architecture. 166 Sumner Street is an Italianate house built in 1870. Six houses are Queen Anne in style, the most of any individual style. There are three Colonial Revival houses, and one Shingle style house with Colonial Revival features. There is one Georgian Revival house, and two that are Second Empire (the 1867 house at 139 Sumner Street joining 184 Gibbs Street in this category.)

== See also ==
- National Register of Historic Places listings in Newton, Massachusetts
