= John Harbach House =

Historic house in Massachusetts, United States

- U.S. National Register of Historic Places
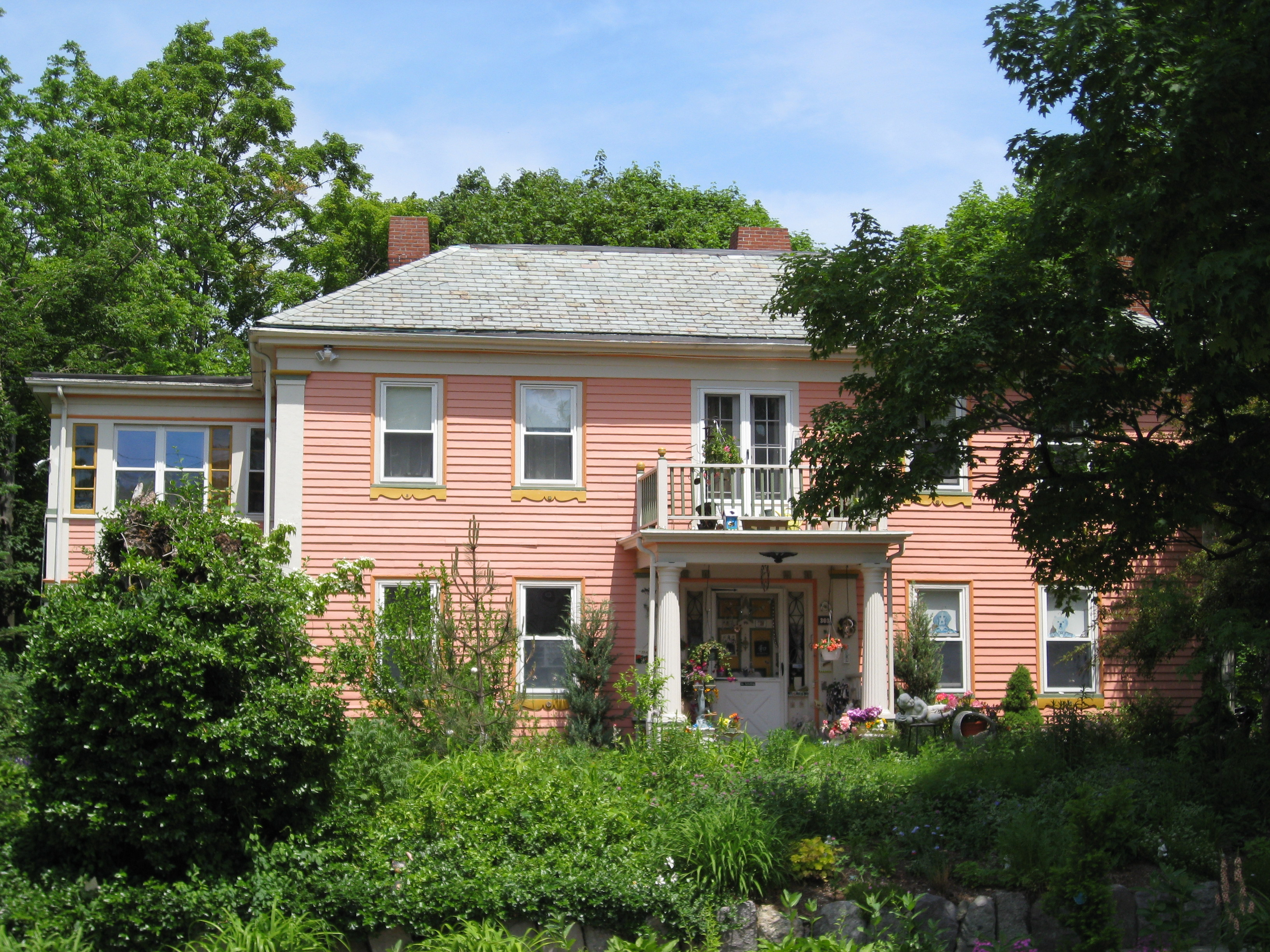
- John Harbach House

- Location within Massachusetts Location within the United States
- Location: 303 Ward St., Newton, Massachusetts
- Coordinates: 42°20′20″N 71°11′9″W
- Built: 1800
- Architectural style: Federal
- MPS: Newton MRA
- NRHP reference No.: 86001809
- Added to NRHP: September 04, 1986

The John Harbach House is a historic house at 303 Ward Street in Newton, Massachusetts. The 2 1/2-story wood-frame house was built c. 1800, and is one of a few surviving Federal style houses in Newton Centre. It is one of three that are associated with the Ward family, who were early settlers of the area. The house has pilastered corners and mitered window moulding strips, and a porch sheltering the front entry that is Colonial Revival in styling. It is currently painted pink with white trim.

The house was listed on the National Register of Historic Places in 1986.

== See also ==
- National Register of Historic Places listings in Newton, Massachusetts
