= Loraine Leeson =

American birth control movement leader ((1905–1982)

Loraine Leeson Campbell
- Born: May 12, 1905; Newton Centre, Massachusetts, U.S.
- Died: February 10, 1982 (aged 76); Cambridge, Massachusetts, U.S.
- Education: Vassar College
- Occupation: Birth control activist
- Organization(s): Birth Control League of Massachusetts, Planned Parenthood Federation of America
- Known for: Leadership in the Massachusetts birth control movement
- Spouse: Walter E. Campbell
- Children: 3 sons
- Parent: Robert Ainsworth Leeson (father) Mildred Dix. Leeson (mother)
- Relatives: A. Dix Leeson (brother)

Loraine Leeson Campbell (May 12, 1905 – February 10, 1982) was an American birth control activist known for her leadership in the Massachusetts birth control movement during the mid-20th century. Serving as president of both the Birth Control League of Massachusetts and the Planned Parenthood Federation of America, Campbell played a significant role in advocating for increased access to contraceptive services and the legalization of birth control in Massachusetts. Despite encountering opposition, including from the Roman Catholic Church, her efforts contributed to advancements in contraception rights within the state. Additionally, her involvement as a mediator within the birth control movement played a part in achieving legal victories on a national level, such as the Griswold v. Connecticut Supreme Court decision, which established a constitutional right to privacy regarding contraception.

== Biography ==
=== Early life and education ===
Loraine Leeson was born on May 12, 1905, in Newton Center, Massachusetts, to Robert Ainsworth Leeson, a corporate executive, and Mildred Dix. She hailed from a socially prominent Boston family and received her education at the Winsor School, where she demonstrated academic and athletic excellence, eventually becoming student body president.

In 1928, her mother died, followed by her grandmother, Mrs. Emily F. Dix, in 1943. Mrs. Dix's will specified that all her possessions were to be equally shared among Loraine Leeson and her siblings – Robert Leeson, Mrs. Marlon Leeson Morey, and Alfred Dix Leeson. Additionally, Mrs. Dix bestowed significant sums during her lifetime to her daughter, Mildred Dix Leeson.

After graduating from Winsor, Leeson enrolled at Vassar College in 1924, majoring in psychology and graduating in 1928. During her time at Vassar, she engaged in activism, including participation in pickets during strikes, which surprised her parents. Despite her involvement in activism, she earned academic honors, being elected to Phi Beta Kappa, and also served as student body president. Following the passing of her mother during her senior year, Leeson declined job offers for child development research and instead returned to Boston to assist in raising her three younger siblings.

=== Early involvement in the birth control movement ===
Leeson's early involvement in the birth control movement was motivated by her aspiration to conduct research on language development in brain-damaged children. To pursue this goal, she rented space in the laboratory of Stanley Cobb at Harvard Medical School, despite facing administrative objections within Cobb's department. During this period, Leeson established relationships with members of the Harvard medical community who were actively engaged in providing contraceptive services to the indigent through birth control clinics.

In 1934, Leeson married Walter E. Campbell, an architect, and the couple had three sons. Marriage provided Leeson with social acceptance, allowing her to assume leadership positions within the Massachusetts birth control movement. She served as vice president of the state league and chaired the executive committee of the state's first birth control clinic.

=== Advocacy for birth control in Massachusetts ===
In the late 1920s, a coalition of birth control advocates in Massachusetts rallied around Antoinette Konikow, a physician arrested for delivering a lecture on family planning. This spurred the formation of the Birth Control League of Massachusetts, which sought legislative changes in 1931 to the Comstock law, aiming to grant physicians the ability to provide contraceptive information to married patients. Faced with legislative inertia, the birth control proponents established a clinic in Brookline in 1932 to offer services to those without access to private care. Over subsequent years, a network of seven clinics across the state provided contraceptive services to thousands of women. However, this growing activity encountered opposition from the Roman Catholic clergy, leading to police raids in 1937 that closed the clinics.

Undeterred, birth control advocates adjusted their strategy, pursuing legal avenues and ballot initiatives. Loraine Leeson, played a significant role within the movement since the 1940s, mainly participating in public awareness campaigns. She served as president of the league from 1940-1943 and 1945-1949, seeking support from the Massachusetts Medical Society. However, reform measures in 1942 and 1948 faced narrow defeats in voter referendums, reflecting opposition from Catholic quarters to the legalization of contraception.

From 1949 to 1952, she served as a member of the board of directors of the Civil Liberties Union, Massachusetts. Additionally, from 1944 to 1945, she served on the board of overseers of Shady Hill School in Cambridge.

Leeson's persistence in advocating for legal access to birth control in Massachusetts eventually saw success in the 1960s, with the passage of a reform bill recognizing the legality of medically prescribed contraception. Additionally, she contributed to national efforts with Planned Parenthood, serving as a director from 1941-1969 and as president from 1956-1959.

=== Later life and legacy ===
In the 1970s, as Cold War-era population control advocates sought to align Planned Parenthood with their agenda, Leeson reaffirmed the movement's foundation in humanitarian concern for women's rights, while also finding ways to address their worries about rapid population growth. She died in Cambridge, Massachusetts, on February 10, 1982. She is survived by her husband, Walter E. Campbell; three sons: Leeson of Dedham, Dix McDill of Belmont, and Charles Lanning Campbell of Colorado Springs, Colorado; a brother, A. Dix Leeson of Cuttyhunk; as well as six grandchildren.

== Bibliography ==
- Reed, James W. (February 2000). "Campbell, Loraine Leeson (1905-1982), birth control movement leader". American National Biography. New York: Oxford University Press. doi:10.1093/anb/9780198606697.article.1500998.
