= Boston Edison Power Station =

- U.S. National Register of Historic Places
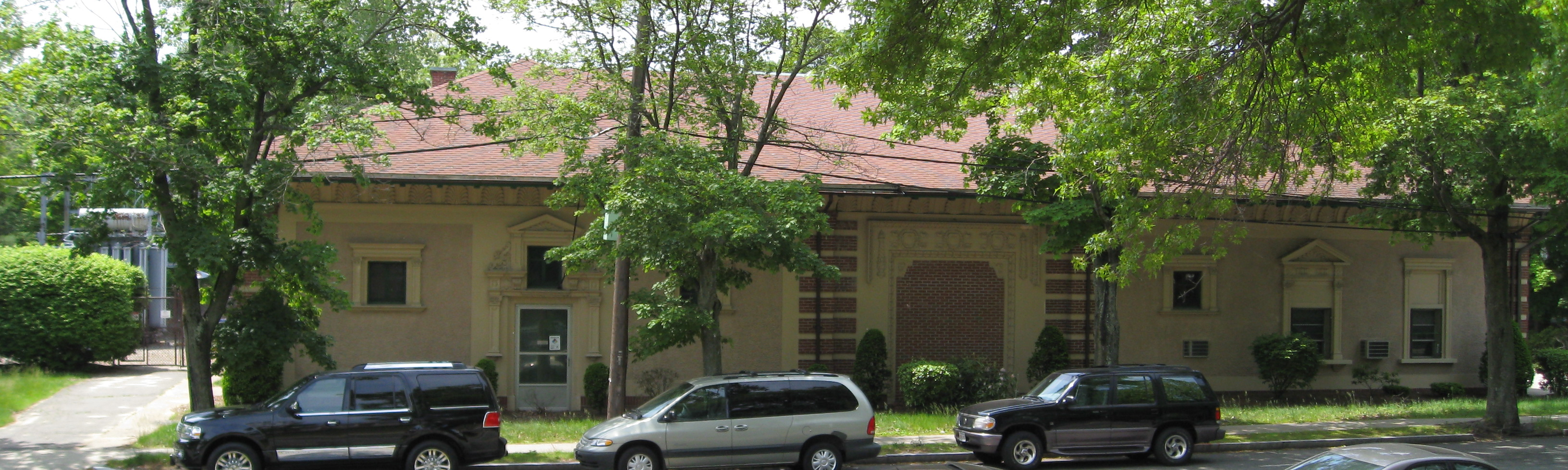
- Homer Street Station

- Location within Massachusetts Location within the United States
- Location: 374 Homer St., Newton, Massachusetts
- Coordinates: 42°20′11″N 71°12′37″W
- Area: less than one acre
- Built: 1904
- Architect: Bigelow & Wadsworth
- Architectural style: Classical Revival, Mannerist Classical Revival
- MPS: Newton MRA
- NRHP reference No.: 90000023
- Added to NRHP: February 16, 1990

The Boston Edison Power Station is a historic power station at 374 Homer Street in Newton, Massachusetts. Built in 1904 and twice enlarged, it is a significant reminder of the city's early electrification efforts, providing power to both area buildings and the local streetcar network. The building was listed on the National Register of Historic Places in 1990. It presently serves as a power distribution hub.

== Description and history ==
The Boston Edison Power Station stands on the south side of Homer Street, just west of the Newton Free Library and across the street from the Newton City Hall and War Memorial. It is a single-story structure, finished in stucco and brick, with a flattened hip roof. The angled portion of the roof is red tile, with exposed rafter ends in the eaves below. The corners of the building have brick quoining, which also articulate the major sections of the facade. The facade is divided into three sections, with the entrance in the left section, framed by an elaborate temple-like surround. The right section has a window in a similar position, with a less elaborate surround. The narrow central section has a bricked-over garage-style entrance, framed by a leaf-molded cast stone surround.

In 1904, the Edison Electrical Illuminating Company built a portion of this building, at first to provide power to the surrounding neighborhood. It was built next to a carbarn and power station of the local streetcar line. It was enlarged twice, in 1910 and 1913, each time stylistically sympathetic to the original design of Bigelow and Wadsworth. With the later additions, the company took over the provision of power to the streetcar system. It an important historical component in the early period of the city's electrification, and a rare surviving example of that period's industrial architecture.

== See also ==
- National Register of Historic Places listings in Newton, Massachusetts
