= Morton Road Historic District =

Historic district in Massachusetts, United States

- U.S. National Register of Historic Places
- U.S. Historic district
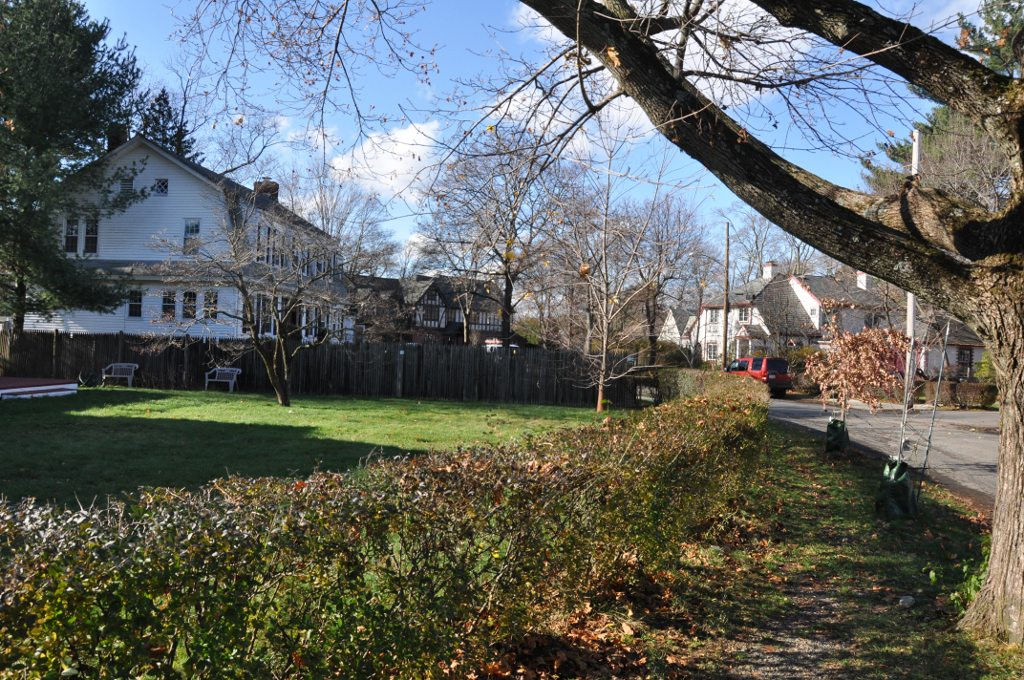
- Houses on Morton Road

- Location within Massachusetts Location within the United States
- Location: Morton Rd. at Morton St., Newton, Massachusetts
- Coordinates: 42°20′21″N 71°12′7″W
- Architect: Ramsey, Gilbert Miles; Et al.
- Architectural style: Colonial Revival, Bungalow/Craftsman, Tudor Revival
- MPS: Newton MRA
- NRHP reference No.: 90000010
- Added to NRHP: February 16, 1990

The Morton Road Historic District encompasses an example of a small residential subdivision in Newton, Massachusetts that was attractively designed in 1915. The architect-designed subdivision filled in an area otherwise surrounded by roads that had been developed earlier, and was built out between 1915 and 1928, with a fairly uniform use of Craftsman and Tudor Revival styling. The district was listed on the National Register of Historic Places in 1990.

== Description and history ==
Morton Road is a short L-shaped roadway in a quiet residential area just north of Commonwealth Avenue in central Newton. It joins Morton Street on the east with Royce Road on the north. The district includes six contributing houses that are either Tudor or Craftsman in their styling, giving a cohesive appearance to the area. The other two, a Colonial Revival house at 12 Morton Road, and a Four Square at 20 Morton Road, are smaller than the other houses, and are not jarring intrusions to this cohesion.

The district is a good example of a small residential subdivision, executed in the early decades of the 20th century. In the late 19th century the entire area was part of a proposed park, which had Bulloughs Pond (located a short way to the west) as its centerpiece. Cost and other factors resulted in the abandonment of this proposal, and the area only slowly developed residentially until the mid-1910s. Morton Road was developed in 1915, with plans developed by Gilbert Miles Ramsey, an architect about whom little is known. Ramsey is credited with designing two of the houses, with Dow, Harlow & Kimball also designing two. John V. Pearn designed one, and Harold Ramsay (no known relation to Ramsey) also designed one. Ramsay was one of Newton's most prolific architects of the first half of the 20th century, and lived nearby.

== See also ==
- National Register of Historic Places listings in Newton, Massachusetts
