= Edward Parsons House =

Historic house in Massachusetts, United States

- U.S. National Register of Historic Places
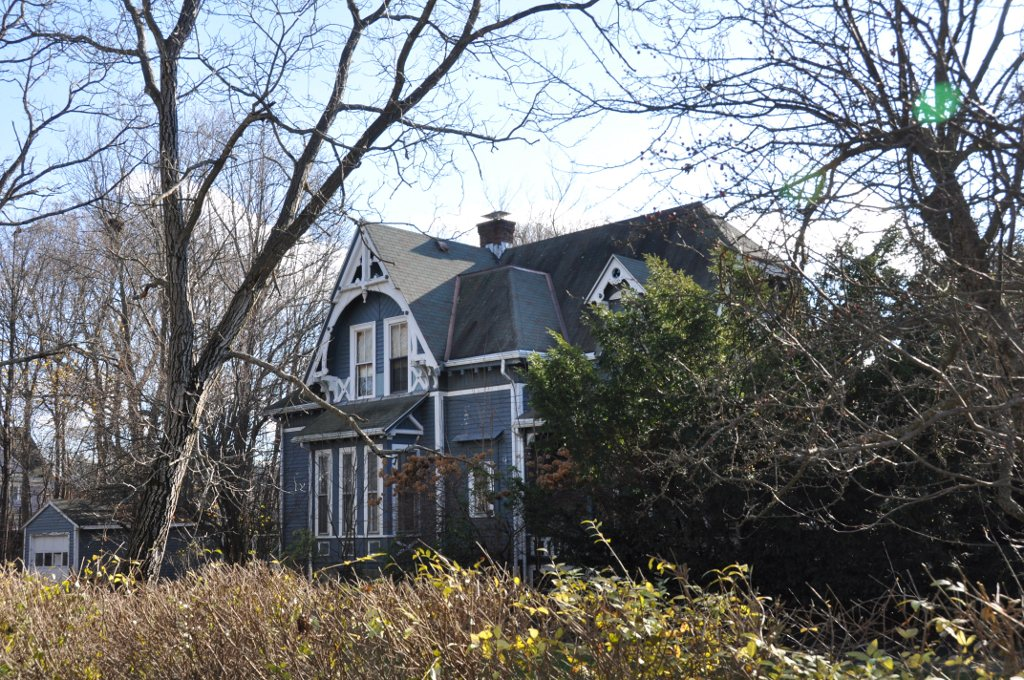

- Location within Massachusetts Location within the United States
- Location: 56 Cedar St., Newton, Massachusetts
- Coordinates: 42°20′18″N 71°11′56″W
- Built: 1877
- Architectural style: Stick/Eastlake
- MPS: Newton MRA
- NRHP reference No.: 86001862
- Added to NRHP: September 04, 1986

The Edward Parsons House is a historic house at 56 Cedar Street in Newton, Massachusetts. Built in 1877, this 1 1/2-story wood-frame house is an unusual local small-scale example of Stick style. Its gables are decorated with applied wood. The porch is further decorated with chamfered posts, brackets, and rosettes. Nothing is known of its first owner, Edward Parsons, who was listed as a "gentleman" in the local business directory.

The house was listed on the National Register of Historic Places in 1986.

== See also ==
- National Register of Historic Places listings in Newton, Massachusetts
