= House at 729 Dedham Street =

Historic house in Massachusetts, United States

- U.S. National Register of Historic Places
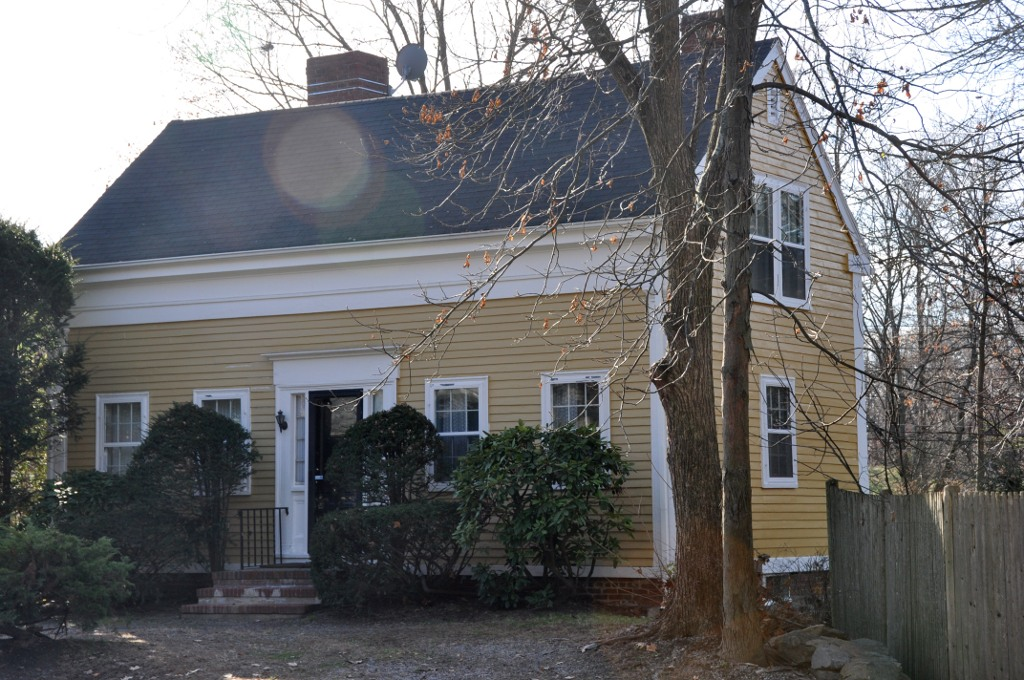

- Location within Massachusetts Location within the United States
- Location: 729 Dedham St., Newton, Massachusetts
- Coordinates: 42°18′1″N 71°11′20″W
- Built: 1855
- Architectural style: Greek Revival
- MPS: Newton MRA
- NRHP reference No.: 86001835
- Added to NRHP: September 04, 1986

The House at 729 Dedham Street is a historic house located at 729 Dedham Street in Newton, Massachusetts.

== Description and history ==
The 1 1/2-story wood-frame house was built c. 1855, and is a rare local example of a Greek Revival cottage. It is five bays wide, with its roof line oriented side to side. Below the roof is a wide entablature, supported by corner pilasters. The front entry is flanked by half-length sidelight windows, with sash windows in the other four bays. It was built for Calvin Rand, about whom nothing is known, and was later occupied by a local schoolteacher.

The house was listed on the National Register of Historic Places on September 4, 1986.

== See also ==
- National Register of Historic Places listings in Newton, Massachusetts
