= Prescott Estate =

Historic house in Massachusetts, United States

- U.S. National Register of Historic Places
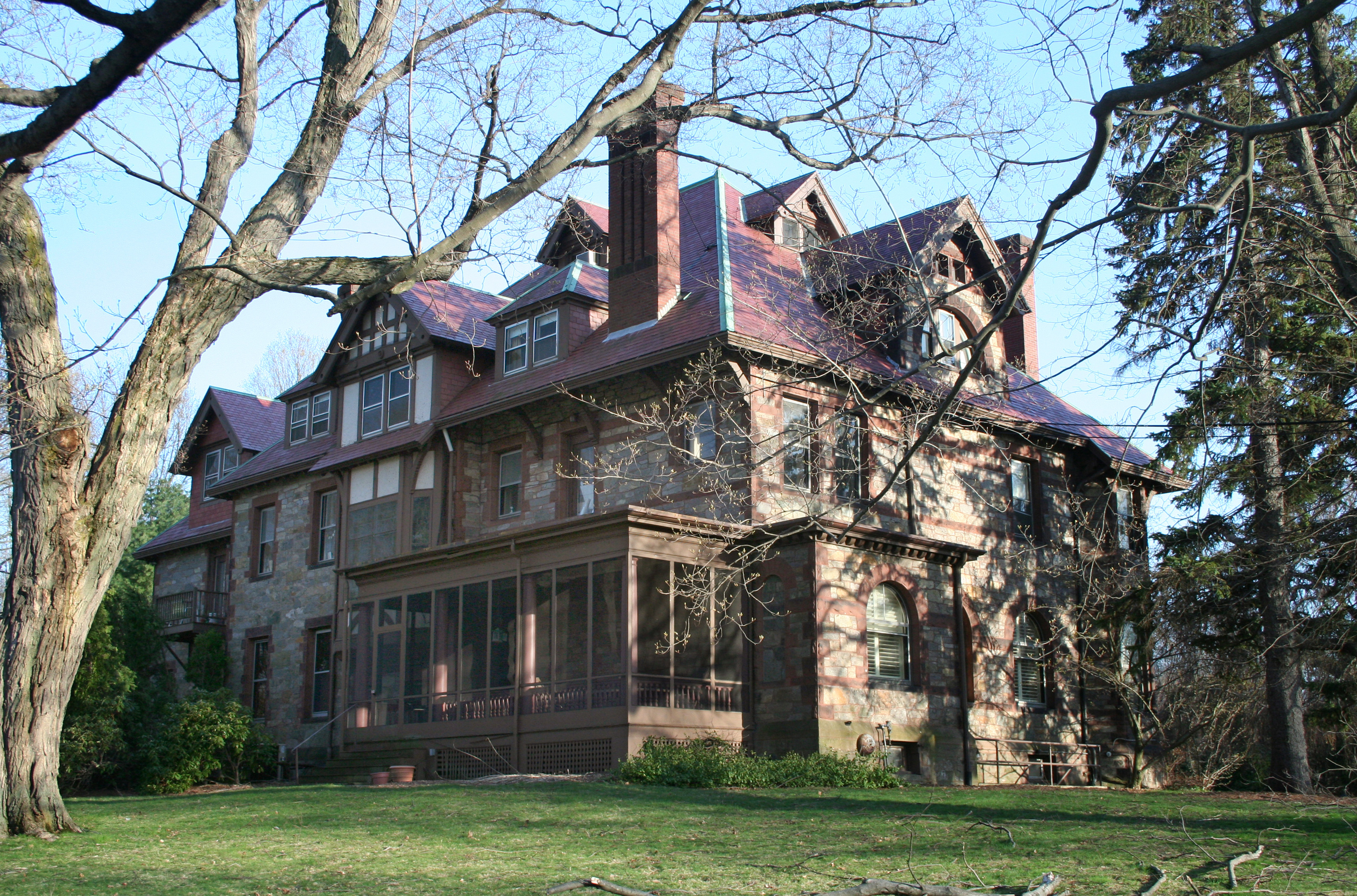

- Location within Massachusetts Location within the United States
- Location: 770 Centre St., Newton, Massachusetts
- Coordinates: 42°20′45″N 71°11′23″W
- Built: 1885
- Architectural style: Late 19th And 20th Century Revivals, Medieval Revival
- MPS: Newton MRA
- NRHP reference No.: 86001866
- Added to NRHP: September 04, 1986

The Prescott Estate is a historic residential estate at 770 Centre Street in Newton, Massachusetts. The main house, a c. 1874 Medieval Revival structure, is a rare local example of residential stone construction, and of the architectural style. Although it was built by Henry Pazolt, a Boston cigar merchant, it soon afterward (c. 1886) came into the Prescott family. In 1954 it was acquired by the Carroll Center for the Blind. In addition to the main house, the estate includes a period carriage house and garage.

The estate was listed on the National Register of Historic Places in 1986.

== See also ==
- National Register of Historic Places listings in Newton, Massachusetts
