= Monadnock Road Historic District =

Historic district in Massachusetts, United States

- U.S. National Register of Historic Places
- U.S. Historic district
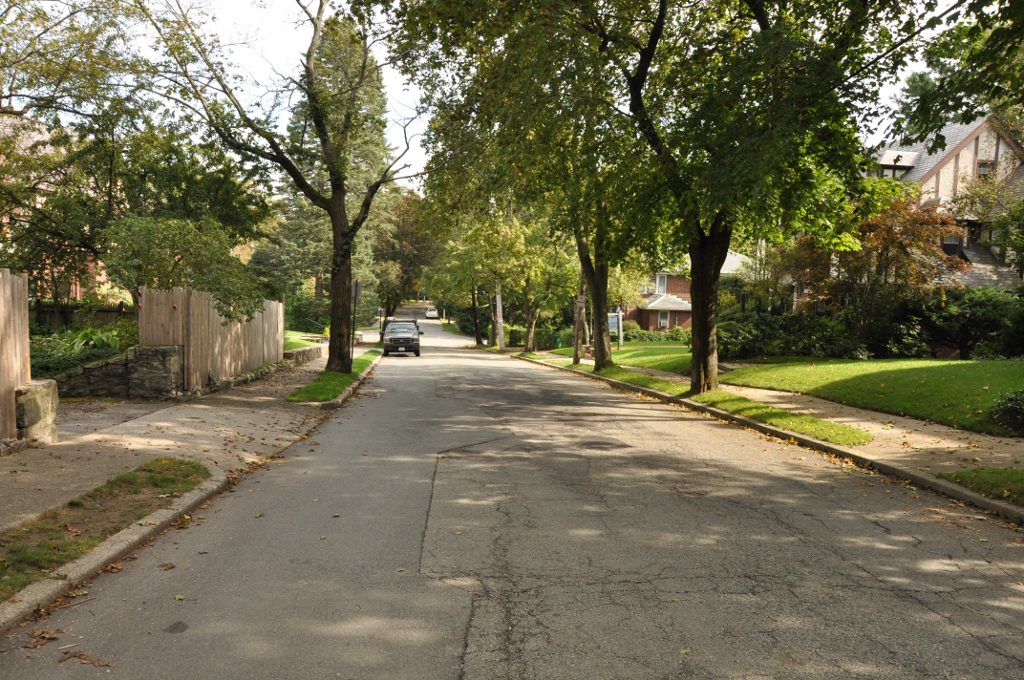
- View down Monadnock Road

- Location within Massachusetts Location within the United States
- Location: Roughly Monadnock Rd., Wachusett Rd., Hudson St., Tudor Rd., Beacon St., and Hobart Rd., Newton, Massachusetts
- Coordinates: 42°20′3″N 71°10′47″W
- Architect: Multiple
- Architectural style: Late 19th And 20th Century Revivals, Bungalow/Craftsman, Queen Anne
- MPS: Newton MRA
- NRHP reference No.: 90000019
- Added to NRHP: February 16, 1990

The Monadnock Road Historic District is a residential historic district encompassing a cohesive subdivision of a former estate in the 1920s in the Chestnut Hill section of Newton, Massachusetts. The development was typical of Newton's explosive residential growth at that time, and includes primarily Tudor Revival houses. The district was listed on the National Register of Historic Places in 1990.

== Description and history ==
Monadnock Road is located on the west side of Chestnut Hill, beginning at its southern end on Beacon Street, just west of the Boston College campus, and winding roughly northwest to an endpoint at Hobart Road, just south of Commonwealth Avenue. Commonwealth Avenue was completed in 1895, opening an area composed of large estates to development. Its construction was promoted by the Newton Boulevard Syndicate, a group that included local property owners, among them Robert Bishop, who owned the land in the western portion of this district. The eastern half the district was laid out in the 1924 subdivision of the estate of Louis Liggett, a drug store magnate. Monadnock Road and the adjacent streets were first identified in a subdivision plan created by Olmsted, Olmsted and Eliot for the syndicate in 1895, but development in that area did not begin until the 1910s and 1920s.

The district includes 63 houses, primarily on Monadnock Road, but also include properties on Tudor Road, Hammond Street, Hammondswood Road, Wachusetts Road, and Hobart Street. The most common architectural style in the district is the Tudor Revival, although the Colonial Revival and Craftsman styles are also represented. The houses are generally large, well-proportioned, and of high quality. The district abuts the Gray Cliff Historic District, which was developed earlier on Robert Bishop's estate.

== See also ==
- National Register of Historic Places listings in Newton, Massachusetts
