= William L. Church House =

Historic house in Massachusetts, United States

- U.S. National Register of Historic Places
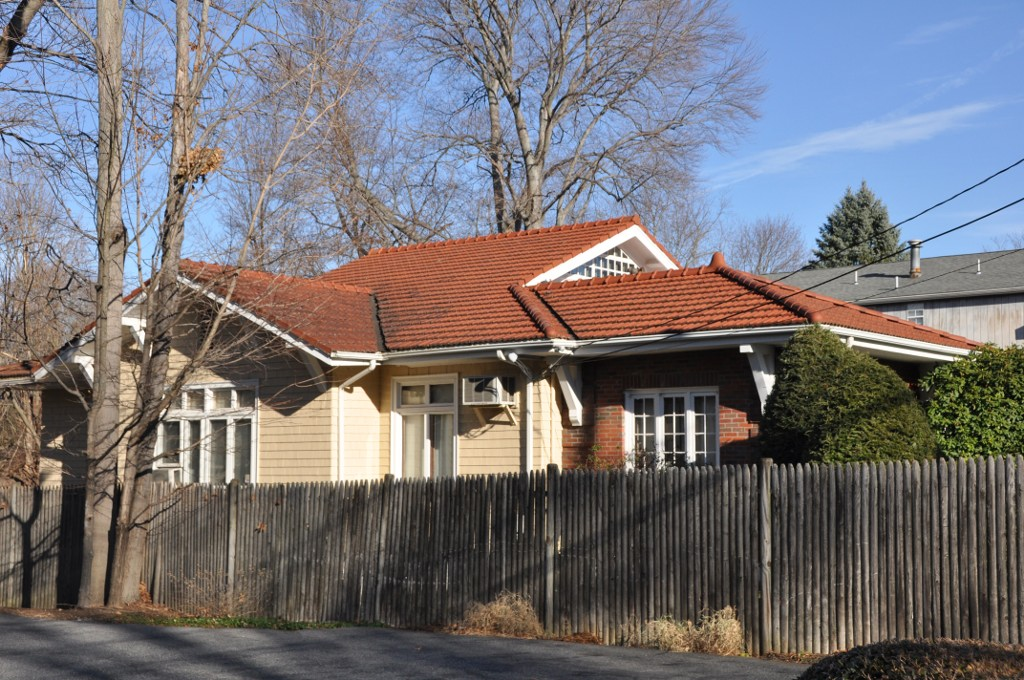

- Location within Massachusetts Location within the United States
- Location: 145 Warren St., Newton, Massachusetts
- Coordinates: 42°19′47.0″N 71°11′18.7″W
- Built: 1916
- Architectural style: Bungalow/Craftsman
- MPS: Newton MRA
- NRHP reference No.: 90000112
- Added to NRHP: February 21, 1990

The William L. Church House is a historic house at 145 Warren Street in Newton, Massachusetts. The 1 1/2-story wood-frame house was built in 1916, and is one of Newton's finest Bungalow-style homes. It has a tiled hip roof with wide eaves supported by brackets, and there are projecting window bays. The entrance porch also features large brackets, and its posts are set on brick piers. Some of the windows have colored glass panes in the transoms. The house's owner, William Church, was a hydraulic and mechanical engineer. The house was custom built for his niece, pianist Dai Buell and was known as the "Aloha Bungalow". The house was listed on the National Register of Historic Places in 1990.

== Acoustic design of the Aloha Bungalow ==
The house was built with a soundproof music studio and a small art gallery. The walls, floors and ceilings were insulated with seaweed for sound acoustics and insulation. It featured a music studio which was "so ingeniously constructed that one can play on the piano and still not be heard in other portions of the house". It was called the "soundless music room" in several articles. The center of the house featured a music room with a sunken floor giving it a height of 27 feet, forming a covered gallery 14 feet above the floor which was used during the weekly musical concerts at the Aloha Bungalow (approx. from 1916 until the death of Dai Buell in 1939).

The house was well known in music circles and was featured in advertisements for Steinway Pianos' including in the Boston Symphony Orchestra concert programs, Season 57, 1937-1938. The advert stated "Steinway, the instrument of the immortals used exclusively by Dai Buell at Aloha Bungalow in a Schumann Program March 15th and 16th and in a program of Bach and some other moderns on April 12th and 13th, at Aloha Bungalow."

== May Days ==
Dai Buell famously held annual May Day celebrations at the "Aloha Bungalow" at 145 Warren Street, Newton Centre, which according to a local newspaper she would keep open house and arrange a program of dancing and music lasting well into the evening. The May Day event included "traditional folk dances, and a Maypole dance followed by several musical selections by artists of distinction."

== Modern Changes ==
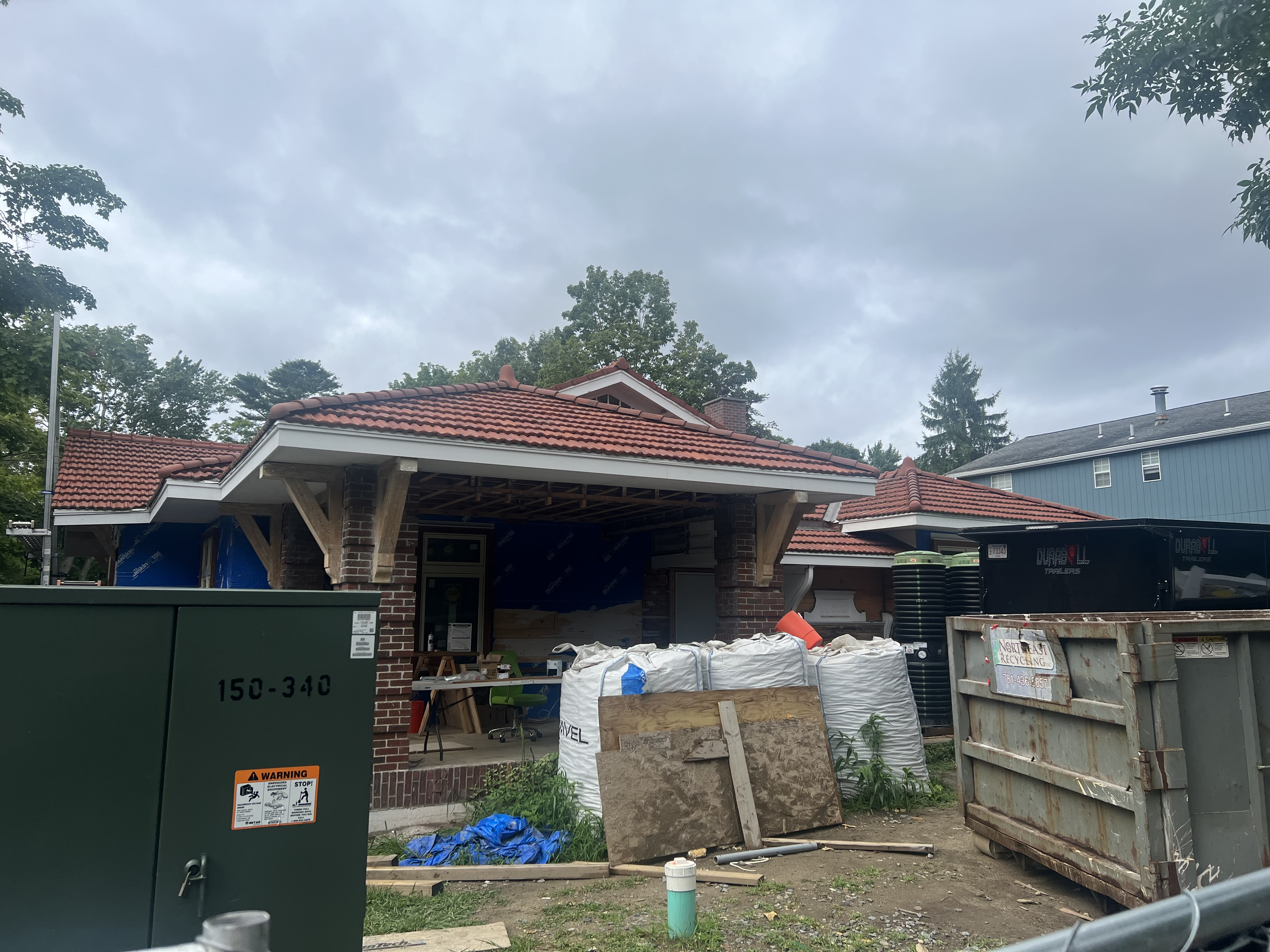
Construction on 145 Warren St.

In 2019, the Newton City Council would look into granting a permit to add houses behind 145 Warren Street as well as restoring the house. Controversy would arise due to the building of new houses by public transit, as 145 Warren Street is near Newton Centre station. A permit would later be granted to build 4 new units.

== See also ==
- National Register of Historic Places listings in Newton, Massachusetts
