= Crystal Lake and Pleasant Street Historic District =

Historic district in Newton, Massachusetts

- U.S. National Register of Historic Places
- U.S. Historic district
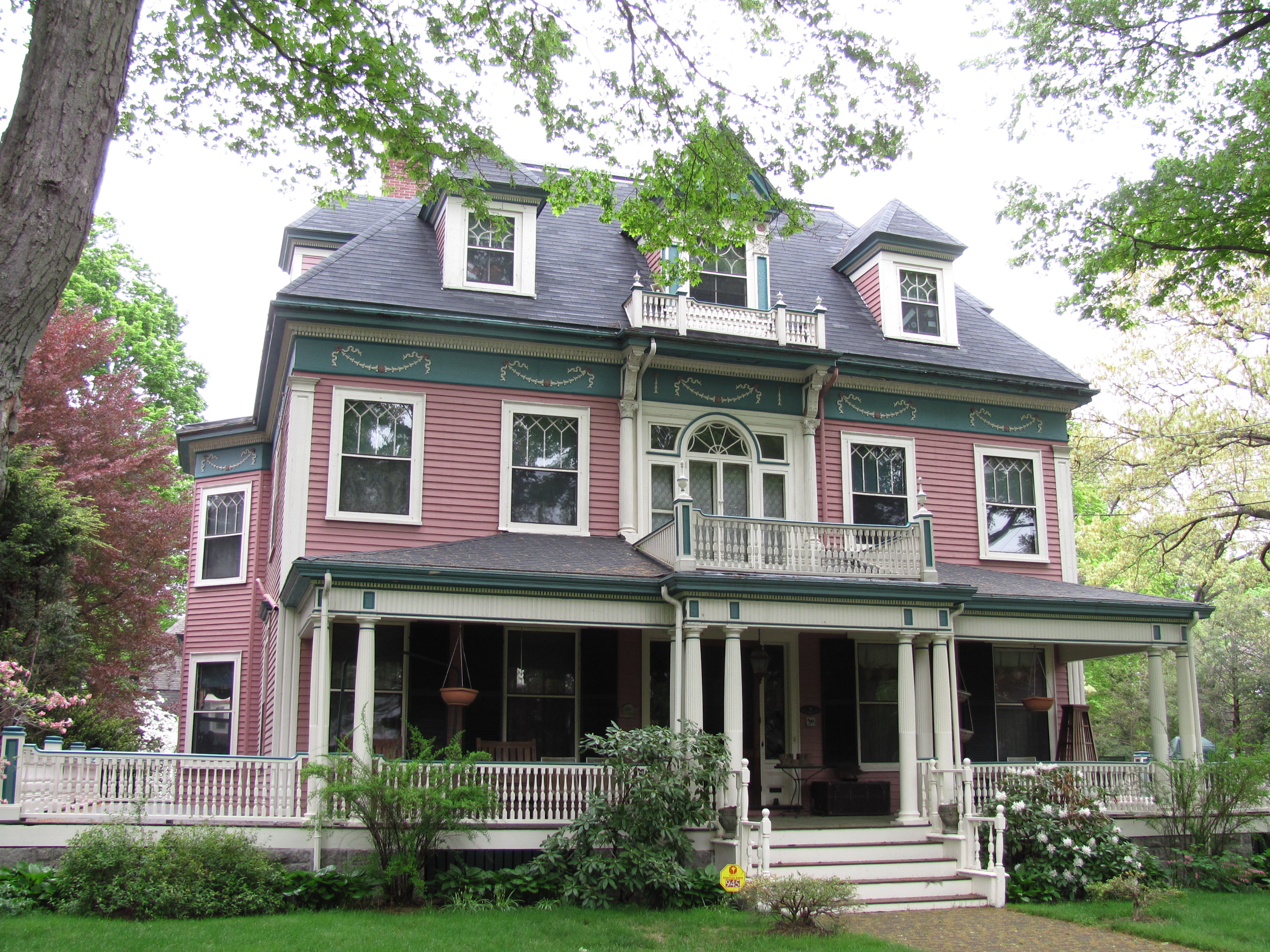
- House on Webster Court

- Location within Greater Boston area Location within Massachusetts Location within the United States
- Location: Roughly bounded by Sudbury Aqueduct, Pleasant Ave., Lake Ave., and Crystal St. and Webster Ct., Newton, Massachusetts
- Coordinates: 42°19′48″N 71°12′5″W
- Area: 8.3 acres (3.4 ha)
- Architectural style: Colonial Revival, Late Victorian, Mansard
- MPS: Newton MRA
- NRHP reference No.: 86001735
- Added to NRHP: September 04, 1986

The Crystal Lake and Pleasant Street Historic District encompasses a streetcar suburban residential subdivision developed between 1860 and 1895 in Newton, Massachusetts. The district roughly bounded by the Sudbury Aqueduct, Pleasant Street, Lake Avenue, Webster Court, and Crystal Street. The subdivision was laid out in the 1850s after the Boston and Charles Railroad line (now serving the MBTA Green Line D branch) was extended through Newton from Brookline. The district was listed on the National Register of Historic Places in 1986.

== Description ==
The oldest houses in the district are on Pleasant Street, and date to the 1850s. The street has a series of well-preserved Carpenter Gothic houses, with fanciful scroll-sawn vergeboard decoration in the gables, dormers, and porches. Another of the older houses in the district is the c. 1858 Bracketed Italianate house at 21 Lake Avenue. The only Second Empire house in the district is a modest cottage at 112 Pleasant Street.

Later styles are also well represented in the 23 properties in the district. 97 Lake Avenue is a particularly well-sited Queen Anne Victorian, with flared eaves, conical tower, and elaborate porte cochere. Stick styling is represented in the house at 908 Beacon Street, and an excellent Colonial Revival home is found at 38 Lake Avenue. This house was built c. 1893 for David Andrews, president of the Boston Bridge Works Company, and has excellent views of Crystal Lake.

== History ==
Roswell Turner, a local businessman, began amassing land in this area in the 1840s. Turner was responsible for extending Beacon Street to the area, and laid out Lake Avenue. Many of his lots in his subdivisions were later developed by Charles Davis, a Boston-based piano merchant and local real estate developer. Crystal Lake was at the time also developed as a recreational resource.

== See also ==
- National Register of Historic Places listings in Newton, Massachusetts
