= Gray Cliff Historic District =

Historic district in Massachusetts, United States

- U.S. National Register of Historic Places
- U.S. Historic district
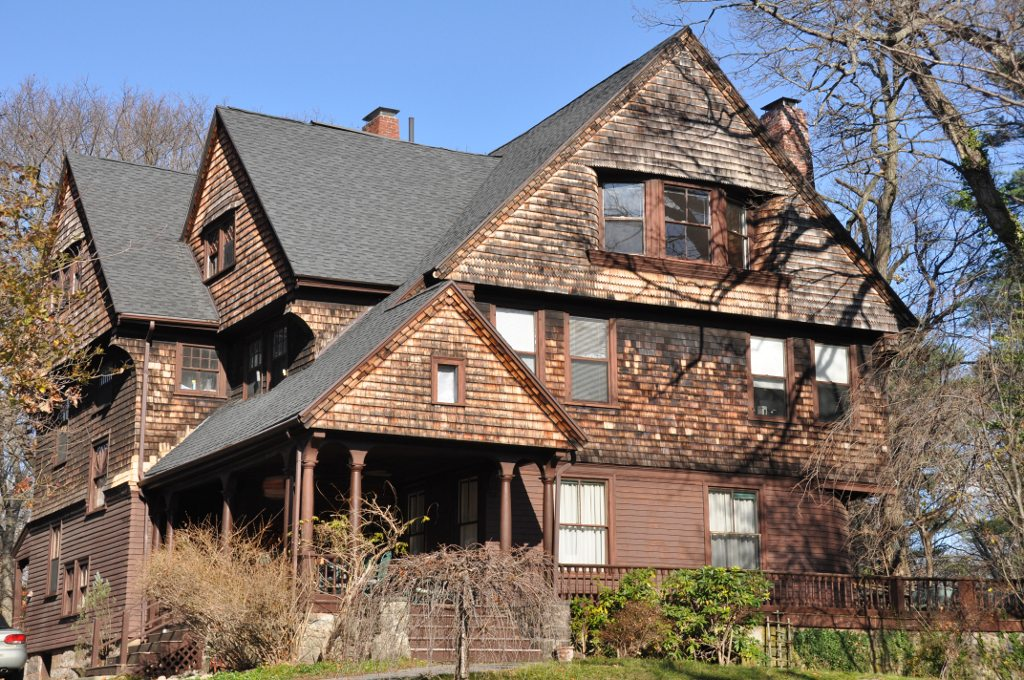

- Location within Massachusetts Location within the United States
- Location: 35, 39, 43, 53, 54, 64, 65, and 70 Gray Cliff Rd., Newton, Massachusetts
- Coordinates: 42°19′51″N 71°11′11″W
- Architect: Killoway, Herbert
- Architectural style: Classical Revival, Shingle Style
- MPS: Newton MRA
- NRHP reference No.: 86001741 (original); 90000011 (increase)

Significant dates
- Added to NRHP: September 04, 1986
- Boundary increase: February 16, 1990

The Gray Cliff Historic District is a residential historic district encompassing a cluster of exceptionally high quality houses built in Newton, Massachusetts, between about 1890 and 1940. When first listed on the National Register of Historic Places in 1986, it included only the eight houses at 35, 39, 43, 53, 54 (destroyed by fire in July 2022), 64, 65, and 70 Gray Cliff Road, which were predominantly Shingle style house built before the turn of the 20th century. The district was expanded in 1990 to include an adjacent area known as The Ledges, where the houses were built between 1900 and 1940, and are mainly Colonial Revival and Tudor Revival in their styling.

The Gray Cliff area was the estate of Massachusetts politician Robert Bishop before it was subdivided for development. The construction of Commonwealth Avenue increased development pressure, and his was one of many estates that was subdivided. The houses are large, and sited on well-proportioned lots that take advantage of the topography of the area, which features rocky outcrops and ledges. It is possible that the subdivision was laid out by a draftsman who once worked for Frederick Law Olmsted. The house at 53 Gray Cliff Road is one of Newton's finest Shingle style houses.

The area of The Ledges was laid out between 1906 and 1912, and includes the original Bishop House at 40 The Ledges Road. This house was originally built in 1861, probably with Italianate styling, but was completely enlarged in the 1890s and restyled in the Colonial Revival style. Two of the houses in this area include two that were designed by architects for their own use: James Ritchie designed the Tudor style house at 10 The Ledges Road, and Henry J. Carlson designed the Colonial Revival house at 91 Bishopsgate Road for his own use; he also designed 131 Bishopsgate Road.

== See also ==
- Monadnock Road Historic District, an adjacent district which covers part of another estate subdivision
- National Register of Historic Places listings in Newton, Massachusetts
