= Newton City Hall and War Memorial =

Historic building in Massachusetts, US

- U.S. National Register of Historic Places
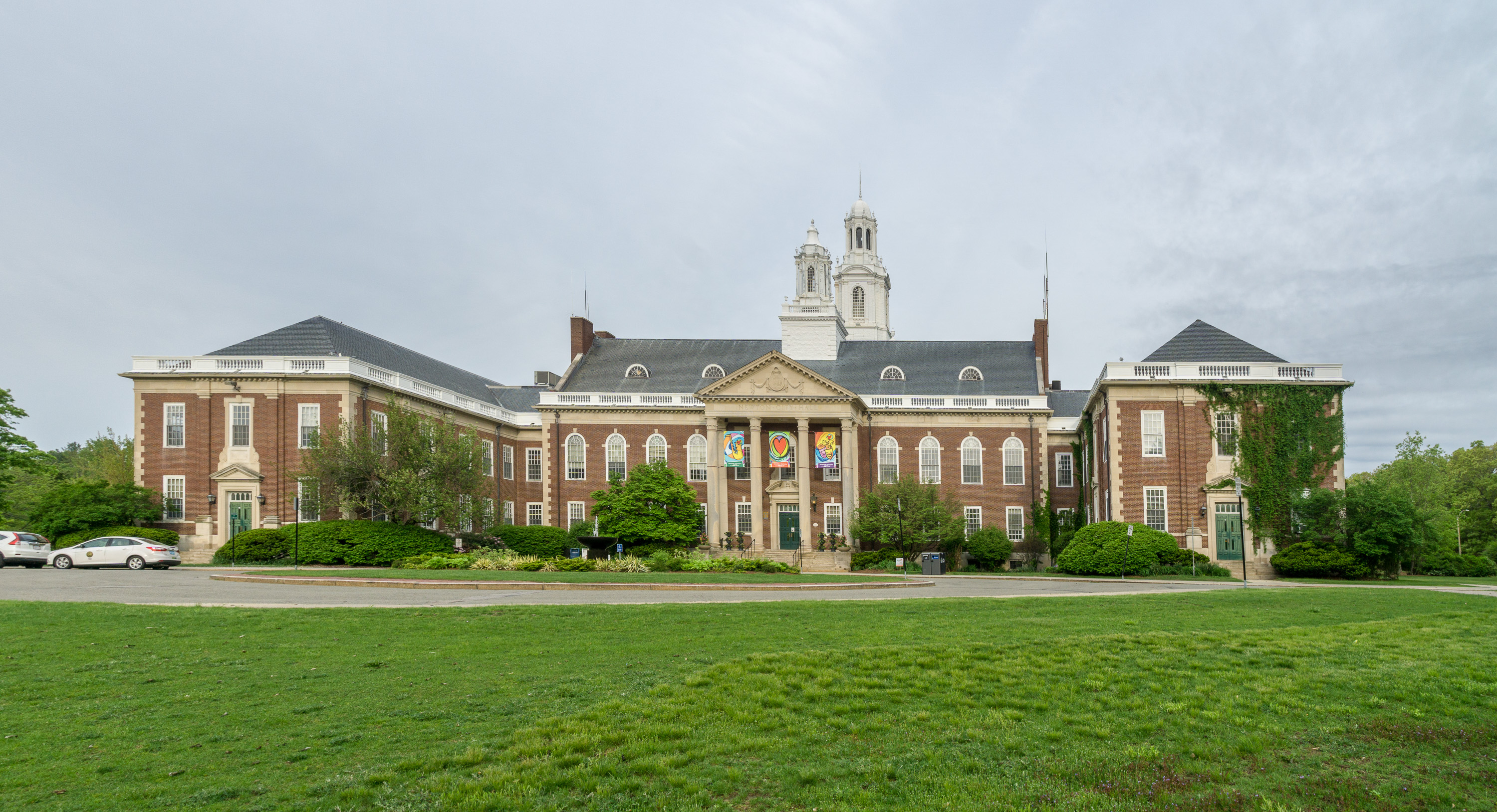
- Newton City Hall and War Memorial

- Location within Massachusetts Location within the United States
- Location: 1000 Commonwealth Avenue, Newton, Massachusetts
- Coordinates: 42.3374°N 71.2088°W
- Built: 1932
- Architect: Allen and Collens; Olmsted Brothers
- Architectural style: Colonial Revival
- MPS: Newton MRA
- NRHP reference No.: 90000020
- Added to NRHP: February 16, 1990

The Newton City Hall and War Memorial is a historic city hall and war memorial building located in the village of Newton Centre in Newton, Massachusetts. Built in 1932 in the Colonial Revival style, the building was designed by Allen and Collens, with landscaping by the renowned Olmsted Brothers. The building's purpose was to serve as a new city hall, and as a memorial to the city's soldiers of the First World War. On February 16, 1990, it was added to the National Register of Historic Places.

== Description and history ==
The original Newton City Hall was and located at 1321 Washington Street where Captain Ryan Park is located today. Current Newton City Hall is located in central Newton, and occupies a large triangular lot bounded on the north by Commonwealth Avenue, on the southwest by Homer Street, and on the east by Walnut Street. Walnut Street and Commonwealth Avenue are major roadways providing access to other parts of the city, and Homer Street is a largely residential street that roughly parallels Commonwealth Avenue. The Newton Free Library is located across Homer Street to the south.

The building is a monumental brick Georgian Revival structure, two stories in height, with a central north-south section, flanking wings that project forward (to the east) at either end, and a rear wing extending from the center to the west. Classical features are found all across the building, including two-story brick pilasters demarcating parts of the building, corner quoining in stone, and a Greek temple-style portico supported by four Corinthian columns. The western portion of the building, which serves as the war memorial, is crowned by an elaborate steeple.

Newton was incorporated as a city (having previously been a town) in 1873, and adapted its then-existing town hall on Washington Street for use as city hall. This new building was constructed in 1931, having a dedication of the war memorial on Armistice Day (November 11), 1931, and a dedication of the combined functions on the same day the following year. The building was designed by the noted Boston architects Allen and Collens, who had designed many university buildings as well as Second Church in Newton (1916), Lindsey Chapel in Boston (1919) and the Riverside Church in New York City (1928–1930) and who later designed The Cloisters in New York City. The triangular parcel was landscaped by the Olmsted Brothers, specifically to soften the large scale of the building.

== See also ==
- National Register of Historic Places listings in Newton, Massachusetts
