= Union Street Historic District (Newton, Massachusetts) =

Historic district in Massachusetts, United States

- U.S. National Register of Historic Places
- U.S. Historic district
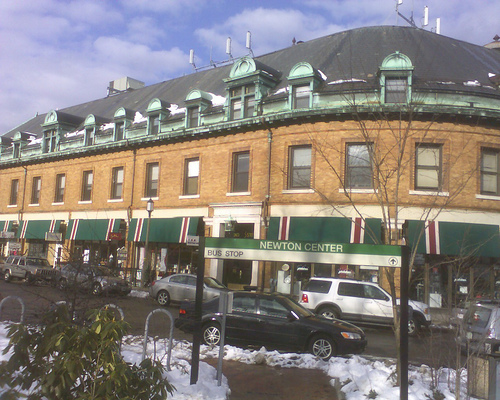

- Location within Massachusetts Location within the United States
- Location: Roughly Union St. between Langley Rd. and Herrick Rd., and 17–31 Herrick Rd., Newton, Massachusetts
- Coordinates: 42°19′46″N 71°11′36″W
- Architect: Shepley, Ruran & Coolidge
- Architectural style: Colonial Revival, Classical Revival, Richardsonian Romanesque
- MPS: Newton MRA
- NRHP reference No.: 86001763
- Added to NRHP: September 04, 1986

The Union Street Historic District is a historic district on Union Street between Langley Road and Herrick Road, and at 17–31 Herrick Road in Newton, Massachusetts. It encompasses Newton Centre's only significant cluster of 19th century commercial buildings. It was added to the National Register of Historic Places in 1986.

Development in the Newton Centre area was primarily north of Beacon Street prior to the Civil War. The railroad was initially used as a freight line for transporting dirt from Needham Heights for landfill creating the Back Bay neighborhood. Passenger service did not begin until the late 1880s, and in 1890 the construction of the railroad depot that served the village. The district includes five buildings: three commercial buildings that line the north side of Union Street, the railroad station, and an apartment block on Herrick Street.

The Newton Centre Station (no longer formally affiliated with the railroad line, which now serves the MBTA Green Line D branch) was designed by H. H. Richardson and completed after his death by his successor firm, Shepley, Rutan and Coolidge. It has typical Richardsonian Romanesque styling, with brownstone and granite construction, and an overhanging slate roof with arched eyebrow dormer windows. The station and an adjacent freight and baggage house were listed on the National Register as part of a district of surviving Richardson railroad stations in Newton; the freight building was mostly demolished in 1985, with parts of the original building being incorporated into new construction on the site, and original landscaping by the Olmsted Brothers also does not survive.

Bray's Block at 93–105, also called Bray's Hall, is the other major building on Union Street. This 2-1/2 story Classical Revival building is built out of buff-colored brick, with a copper-clad hip roof, and a modillioned cornice. Decorative arched windows in the attic are also lined with copper, making a dramatic Beaux-Arts statement. It was built in 1893 by Mellen Bray, the inventor who founded the Tubular Rivet and Stud Company. Bray also built the apartment block at 17–31 Herrick Street.

The Union building at 65–73 Union Street was built in 1896. Georgian Revival in style, it has seven bays with storefronts on the ground level, and an entranceway recessed behind an arch flanked by brick pilasters. It also has a modillioned cornice, with dentil moulding.

Piccadilly Square is an open-air shopping area located in the district. Opened in 1973, it contains 40 stores and 84,777 sq ft (7,876.0 m^{2}) of retail space.

== See also ==
- National Register of Historic Places listings in Newton, Massachusetts
