= Jos. Gunderson House =

Historic house in Massachusetts, United States

- Joseph Gunderson House
- U.S. National Register of Historic Places
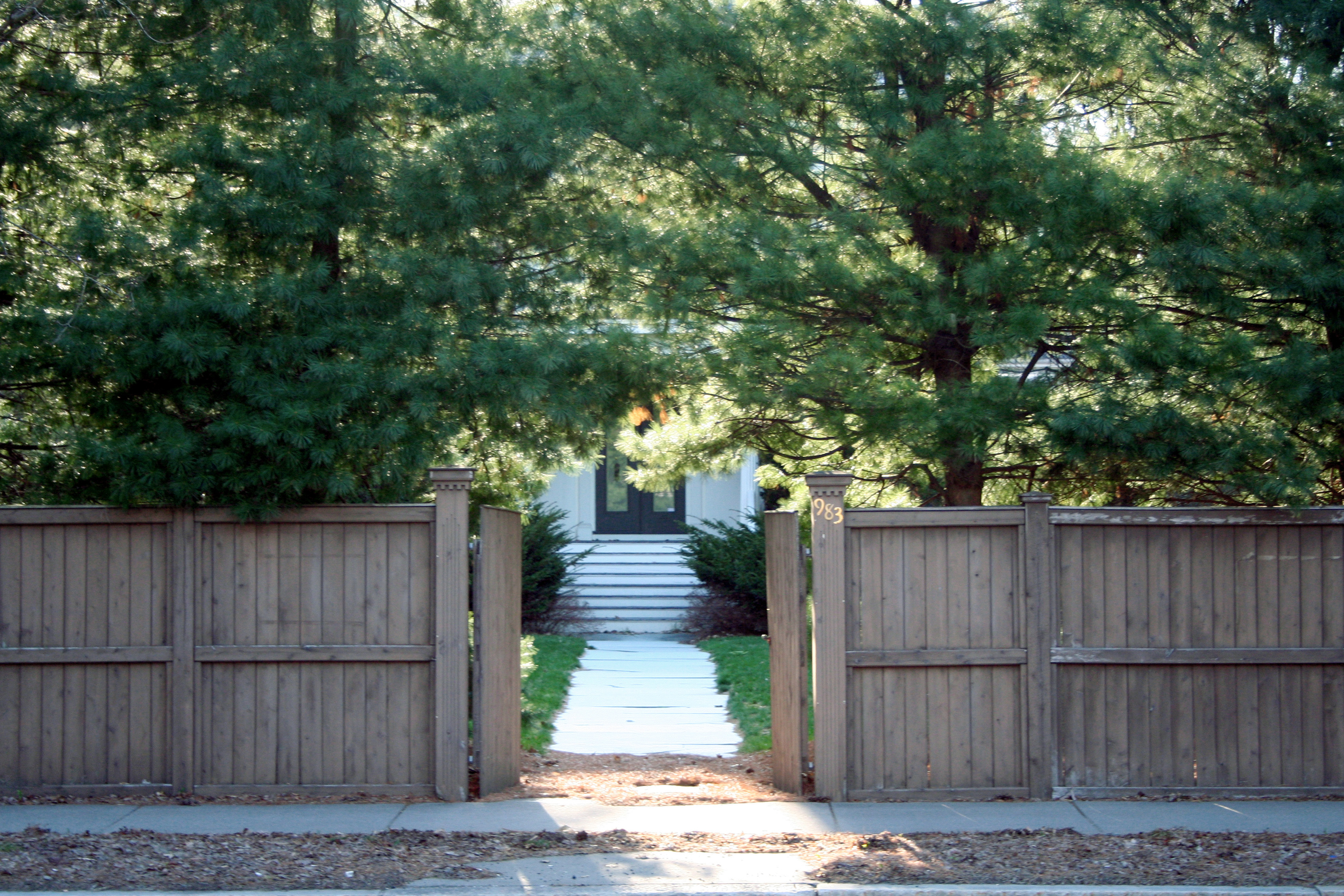

- Location within Massachusetts Location within the United States
- Location: 983 Centre St., Newton, Massachusetts
- Coordinates: 42°20′18″N 71°11′39″W
- Built: 1850
- Architectural style: Early Republic, Greek Revival, Regency
- MPS: Newton MRA
- NRHP reference No.: 86001808
- Added to NRHP: September 04, 1986

== Architecture ==
The Joseph G. Gunderson House at 983 Centre Street is a distinctive example of early housing built in the suburban village of Newton, Massachusetts. The three story wood-frame house was built in 1850, and is an extremely rare example of a Regency variant of Greek Revival styling. This particular type of styling was rarely built outside Boston, and is one of only two known in Newton. 269 Franklin St (Coffin-Wells House, built also in 1850) has a very similar three-bay facade and plan organization but without Regency features. The Jos. Gunderson House was listed on the National Register of Historic Places in 1986.

The front facade has three bays which consists of the central entrance bay and the flanking window bays. The bays are formed by recessed panels that alternate with projecting sections, which emulate the appearance of wide pilasters that lack a typical capital element. The front façade is framed by extremely wide corner pilasters and a Grecian entablature with a tall frieze along the roof line. The center entrance contains twin glazed doors set within a trabeated architrave. It is tucked under a deep raised Classical porch with Corinthian columns in the front corners and surmounted by a Venetian window in the second story. The Corinthian capitals in the front and south porches represent a simplified version of the Greek Corinthian order with single row of acanthus leaves at the bottom surrounding a single row of palm leaves. These features were added as part of a renovation that appears to have occurred at the turn of the 20th century. Windows in the flanking bays contain one-over-one sash; first story windows have molded surrounds with corner blocks. These windows originally had shutters that are no longer in place. The second story windows have wrought iron railings, a Regency feature.

The gable ends contain two tiers of windows and pediments in the gable. The south end has been altered at the turn of the 20th century with the addition of first story bay windows, a Corinthian porch and an arched window flanked by smaller windows in the gable. On the west side, there is a two-story, cross-gable rear kitchen ell. During the 20th century, it has been expanded by a large one-story addition on the north side.

The house is sited at the rear of a half acre lot substantially reduced in size from its original four-acre setting. It is set back behind a large front lawn and screened by a tall fence and mature evergreen trees along the sidewalk. Mature foundation planting flanks the porch on the east facade. Side and rear lot lines are also screened by a tall fence. A paved driveway enters the northeast corner of the lot and follows the northerly lot line to a one-story, wood frame two-car garage with hipped roof. A circular pool, added sometime after 1929 next to the garage, was removed after 1979.

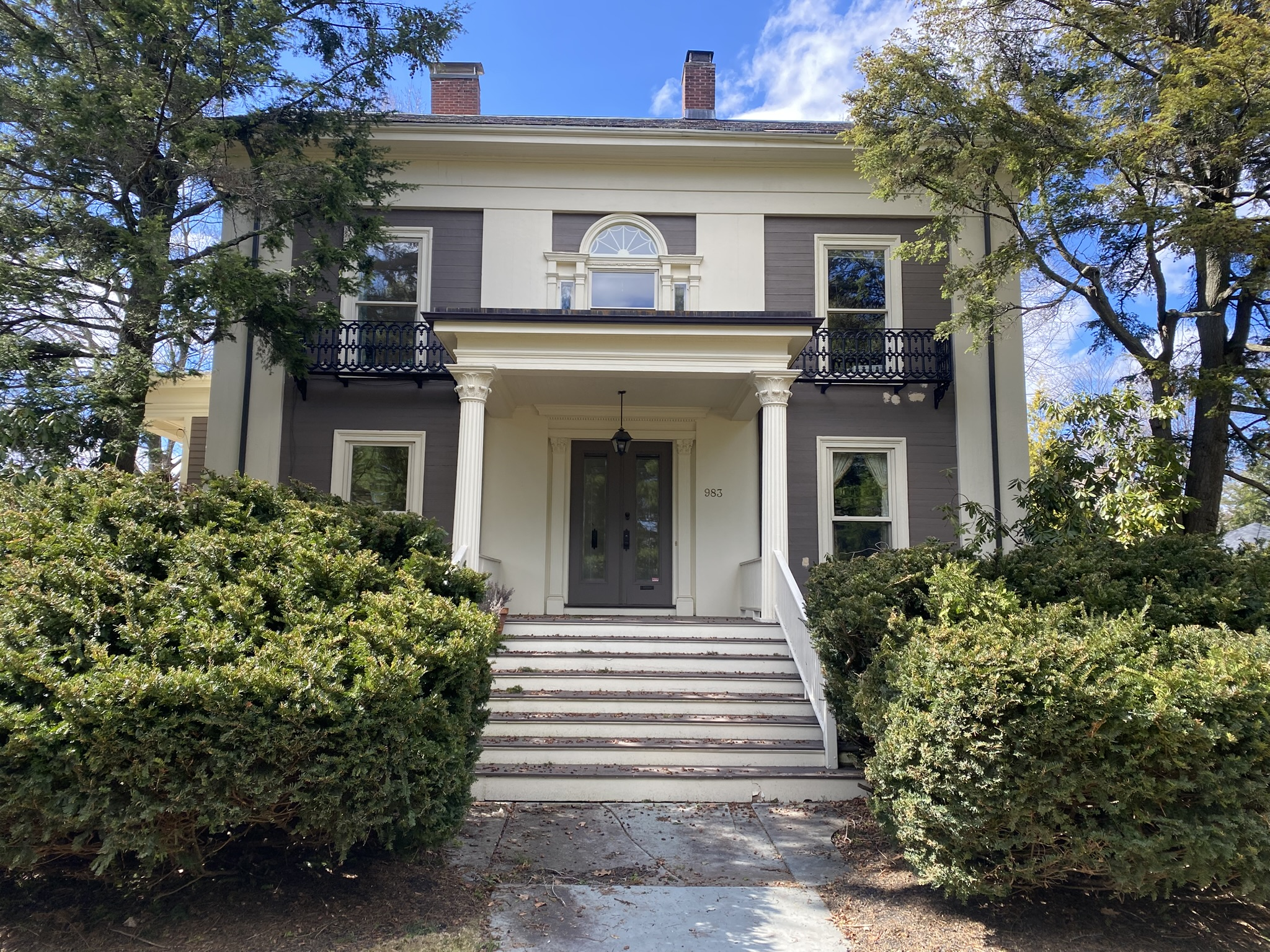
Joseph Gunderson House front facade

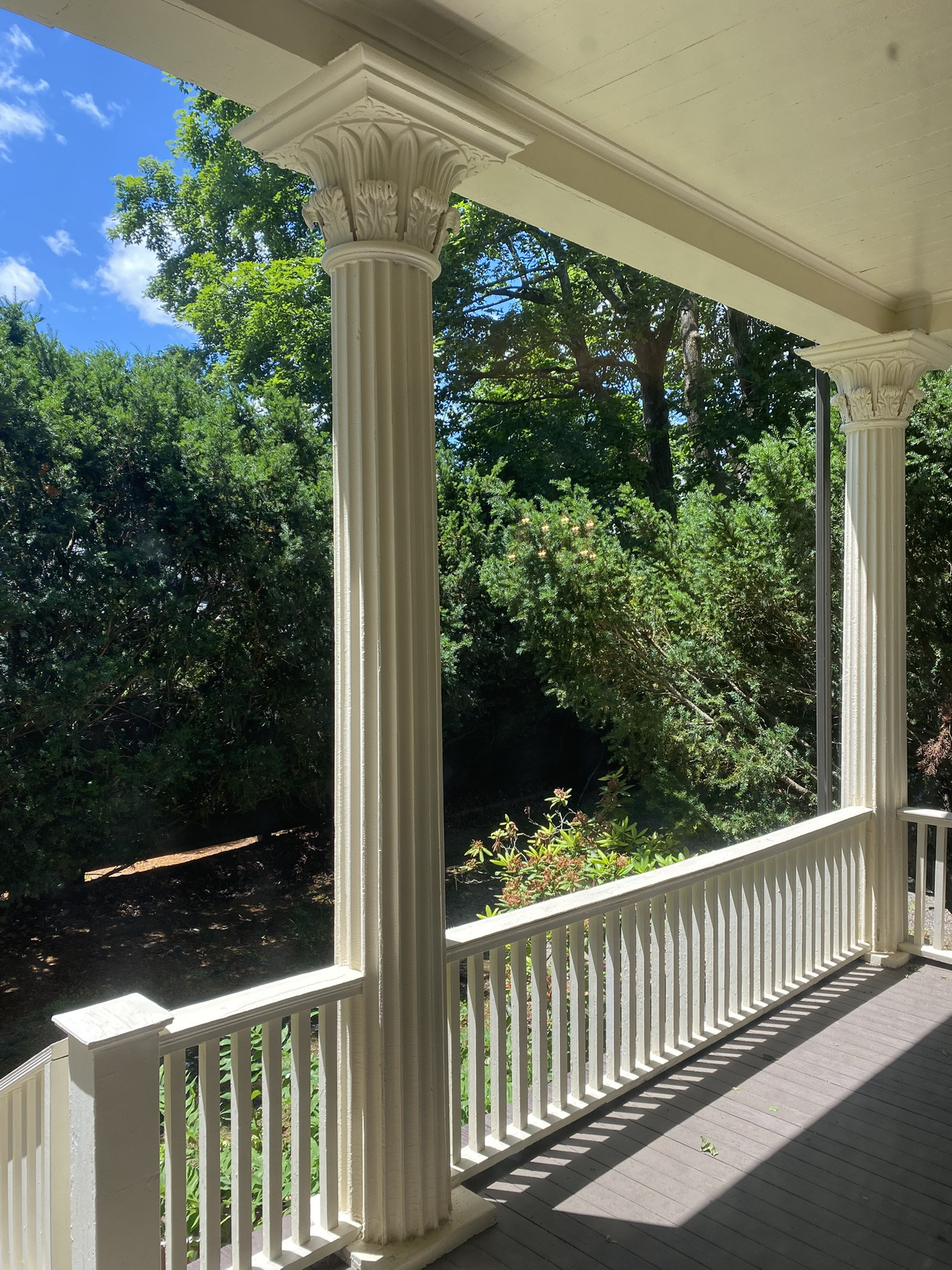
South porch featuring Corinthian columns

== History ==
In 1849, Joseph Goodridge Gunderson, a teller at the Boston Bank, purchased a lot on Centre Street from Martin Morse, who lived just south of the Gunderson property. At the time, Gunderson was residing in Cambridge with his wife, Susan, and their daughter, Helen. The Gunderson House was built in 1850, and the family lived there until Joseph’s death in 1892, after which the property was conveyed to William F. Harbach. In 1901, Charles C. Burr's widow, Abbie Y. Burr, purchased the property and lived there until her death in 1925. At her death, she deeded the house to the Trinity Parish of Newton Centre, devising a life estate to Edward T. Sullivan, the church’s long-time rector.

== See also ==
- National Register of Historic Places listings in Newton, Massachusetts
