= Newton Corner, Massachusetts =

Newton Corner
- Village
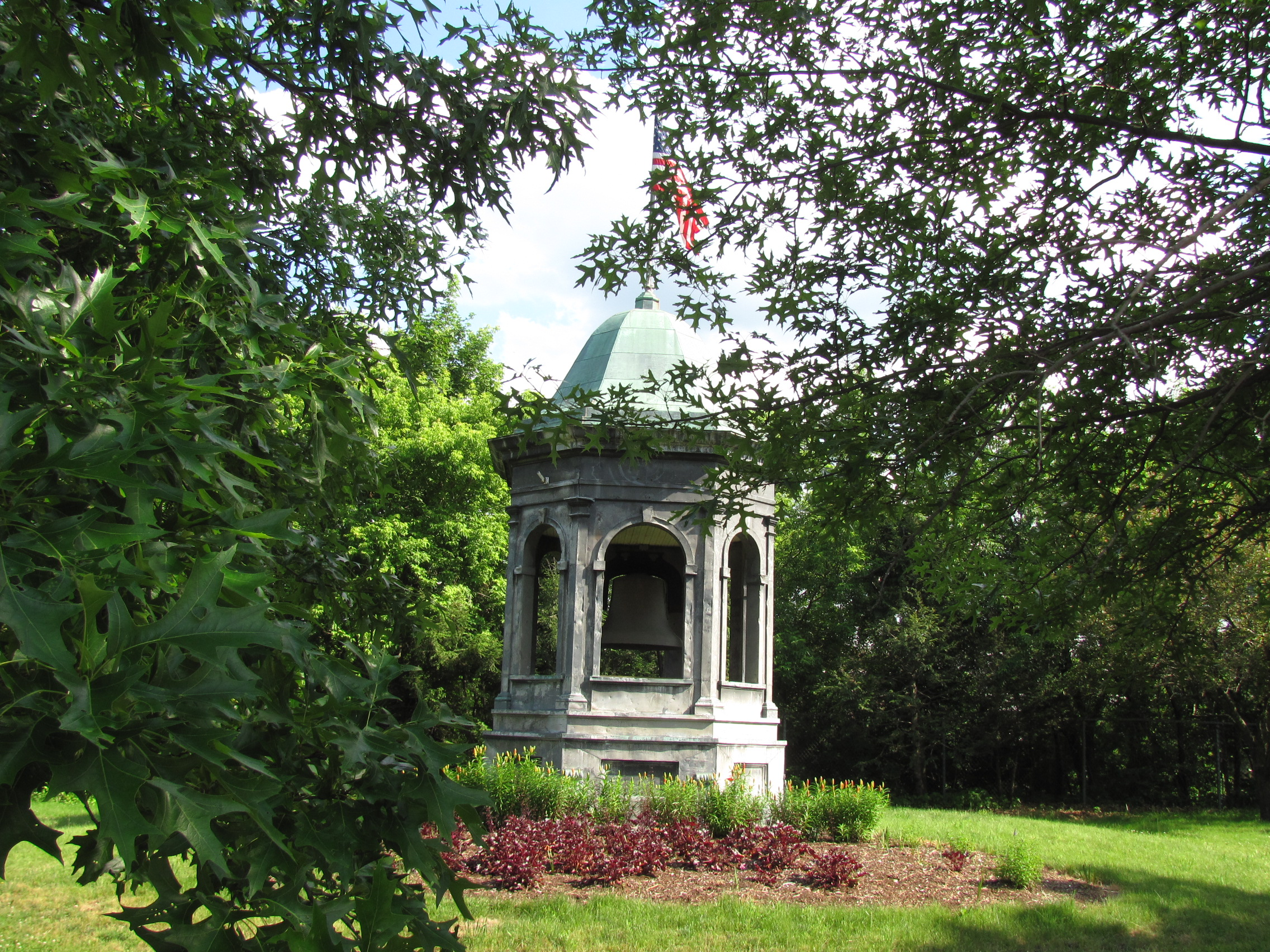
- The Newton Corner Bell

- Location within Greater Boston area Location within Massachusetts
- Coordinates: 42°21′10″N 71°11′00″W
- Country: United States
- State: Massachusetts
- County: Middlesex
- City: Newton
- Elevation: 300 ft (90 m)
- Time zone: UTC-5 (Eastern (EST))
  - Summer (DST): UTC-4 (EDT)
- Area code: 617

Newton Corner is one of the thirteen villages within the city of Newton in Middlesex County, Massachusetts, United States. Newton Corner borders Brighton, a neighborhood of Boston, as well as the city of Watertown, Massachusetts. Newton Corner is divided by the Massachusetts Turnpike (I-90) with on-off access in both directions at Exit 127 (formerly exit 17) via a large, complicated roundabout nicknamed the "Newton Supercollider" and the "Circle of Death".

Newton Corner station formerly saw streetcar and commuter rail service; it now serves as a busy bus depot serving downtown express routes as well as local buses.

== History ==
Newton Corner sprang up in the late 1600s, when a village grew at the intersection of Washington and Centre street, then rural roads. Stores, farm stands, and a tavern came to service the steady stream of traffic. A railway came through in 1834.

The Massachusetts Turnpike was built through the center of Newton Corner in the 1960s, along the line of the former railroad, despite opposition from the City of Newton. An interchange was also added. This drastically changed the nature of the village center, splitting it in two, tearing down one-third of the businesses, and eviscerating the existing street patterns. Newton Corner remains in the twenty-first century rent in two by the deep cut of the turnpike and dominated by the heavy traffic and complicated ramp and road patterns at the interchange, with little pedestrian traffic or intercourse between the two separated halves. According to author Yanni Tsipis, "Newton Corner really ceased to be a to-place. It became more of a through-place".

== Education ==
- Underwood Elementary School (public) – 101 Vernon Street
- Bigelow Middle School (public) – 42 Vernon Street
- Lincoln-Eliot Elementary School (public) – 191 Pearl Street
- Newton Country Day School (private) – 785 Centre Street

The Chamberlayne School, now Mount Ida College, was founded in 1899 as a private all-female high school on Mount Ida Hill in Newton Corner.

== Notable residents ==
- Freelan Oscar Stanley and Francis Edgar Stanley, identical twin inventors of the Stanley Steam Car
- Sidewalk Sam (Robert Guillemin), folk artist
- Steve Grossman, Massachusetts state treasurer, 2011–present

== See also ==
- List of Registered Historic Places in Newton, Massachusetts
