= Chestnut Hill =

Chestnut Hill may refer to:

== Buildings ==
- Chestnut Hill (Windsor Township, York County, Pennsylvania), a house on the National Register of Historic Places, U.S.
- Chestnut Hill (Orange, Virginia), a house on the National Register of Historic Places, U.S.
- The Chestnut Hill, a historic apartment building in Chestnut Hill, Massachusetts, U.S.

== Education ==
- Chestnut Hill Academy, a college preparatory school in Philadelphia, Pennsylvania, U.S.
- Chestnut Hill College, in Philadelphia, Pennsylvania, U.S.

== Places ==
=== United Kingdom ===
- Chestnut Hill, Cumbria, a suburb of Keswick

=== United States ===
- Chestnut Hill, Massachusetts, a neighborhood
- Chestnut Hill Cove, Maryland, an unincorporated community in Anne Arundel County
- Chestnut Hill, North Carolina (disambiguation), multiple locations in North Carolina
- Chestnut Hill, Northampton County, Pennsylvania, a census-designated place
- Chestnut Hill, Philadelphia, Pennsylvania, a neighborhood in Philadelphia
- Chestnuthill Township, Monroe County, Pennsylvania, a township in Monroe County
- Chestnut Hill, Tennessee, a small unincorporated community in Jefferson County
- Chestnut Hill, Virginia (disambiguation), multiple locations in Virginia
- Chestnut Hill, plantation in Alabama founded by William R. King

== Railway stations ==
- Chestnut Hill Avenue (MBTA station), a stop on the MBTA Green Line B branch, in Boston, Massachusetts, U.S.
- Chestnut Hill Branch (disambiguation)
- Chestnut Hill station (disambiguation)

== Other uses ==
- Chestnut Hill (mountain), a low mountain in Pennsylvania, U.S.
- Chestnut Hill (novel series), by Lauren Brooke

== See also ==
- Chestnut Hill Historic District (disambiguation)
- Chestnut Hill Reservation, is a public recreation area and historic preserve surrounding the Chestnut Hill Reservoir in Boston, Massachusetts
- Chestnut Hill Reservoir, a reservoir in Boston, Massachusetts
