= Chestnut Hill Historic District =

Chestnut Hill Historic District may refer to:

- Chestnut Hill Historic District (Birmingham, Alabama), a National Register of Historic Places listing in Birmingham, Alabama
- Chestnut Hill Reservoir Historic District, Boston and Newton, Massachusetts
- Chestnut Hill Historic District (Brookline, Massachusetts)
- Chestnut Hill Historic District (Asheville, North Carolina), a National Register of Historic Places listing in Buncombe County, North Carolina
- Chestnut Hill Historic District (Philadelphia, Pennsylvania)

== See also ==
- Old Chestnut Hill Historic District, Newton, Massachusetts
- The Chestnut Hill, Newton, Massachusetts
- Chestnut Hill-Plateau Historic District, a historic area in the Highland Park neighborhood of Richmond, Virginia
