= Winston Flowers =

Floral retailer in Boston, Massachusetts,

Winston Flowers is a third-generation, family-owned and -operated floral retailer. Based in Boston, Massachusetts, the company has four Massachusetts retail shops—Boston, Massachusetts; Chestnut Hill, Massachusetts; and Wellesley, Massachusetts—and one in Greenwich, Connecticut. The company's design studios in Boston's South End and Long Island City, New York offer daily delivery to Greater Boston, New York City, Fairfield County, and Westchester County, with the capacity to fulfill orders across the continental US through a network of partners.

== History ==
The company was started in 1944 by Robert Winston and his teenage son, Maynard, as a floral pushcart in front of Boston, Massachusetts' original Ritz-Carlton hotel at the corner of Arlington Street and Newbury Street. They opened the first Winston Flowers retail location at 131 Newbury Street in the late 1950s, where it still operates. The Winston family lived in the apartment directly above the store.

Maynard Winston took over the business in 1970 after his father's death and is widely credited with expanding and evolving the company. Beginning in the early 1970s, Maynard built partnerships with local farmers and global growers to source his offerings. Many of these relationships were exclusive for decades, and some remain in place today. In 1975, he opened a shop on Boylston Street focusing on green plants. A location within the Chestnut Hill Mall followed in the early 1980s.

Maynard's sons, David and Ted Winston, assumed leadership of the company in 1988 following his death, making them the third generation of Winstons at the helm.

In 1990, computers were introduced in the workplace to streamline the company’s operations, and an 8,000-square-foot building on Malden Street in Boston’s South End was purchased to house the design, delivery, and client services teams.

After outgrowing that space, Winston Flowers acquired a 75,000-square-foot industrial building on the South End's Southampton Street in stages between 1992-93 to serve as the company's headquarters.

New retail locations in Boston, Massachusetts; Chestnut Hill, Massachusetts; Wellesley, Massachusetts; Hingham, Massachusetts; Concord, Massachusetts, and Greenwich, Connecticut were opened between 2000-2012. The company's philanthropic program, Charity in Bloom, launched in 2012.

In 2018, David and Ted Winston announced the opening of a flagship design studio in Long Island City, New York, in addition to the acquisition of Manhattan florist Surroundings. The 12,000-square-foot studio houses the floral company's New York design and delivery teams to provide same-day service to clients in the Manhattan area. The new studio further expanded the company's delivery reach beyond Greater Boston, as well as Fairfield County and Westchester County, while delivery continues to be offered nationwide through the company's network of partner florists. This expansion was followed by the 2019 acquisition of high-end New York florist L'Olivier.

== Product sourcing ==
The company works with local growers whenever possible, with 50-70% of its floral product in late summer and early fall sourced from New England and New York vendors. The majority of herbs are sourced locally in Massachusetts, Connecticut, Rhode Island, New Hampshire, and New York.

Some local farms grow flowers exclusively for Winston Flowers each year, which generally means that flowers were likely in the ground two days prior to clients receiving them as part of their arrangements.

Some of the company's more exclusive flowers such as Italian sweet pea, anthurium, and lady slipper orchids are imported from the Netherlands, Italy, France, and Ecuador, beginning with Dutch tulips in the early 1970s under Maynard's stewardship.

Winston Flowers' blooms are selected based on their aesthetic qualities, longevity, freshness, and color. Flowers are then transported to Winston Flowers via commercial airlines to preserve fuel and reduce emissions. The majority of products imported overseas comes through New York's John F. Kennedy International airport.

== Retail locations ==
The company has four Massachusetts retail shops—Boston, Massachusetts; Chestnut Hill, Massachusetts; and Wellesley, Massachusetts—and one in Greenwich, Connecticut.

The retail shop on Boston's Boylston Street closed in 2008, and locations in Hingham, Massachusetts; Concord, Massachusetts, and Federal Street in Boston, Massachusetts were shuttered in spring 2020.

== Services ==
David and Ted Winston further developed the company's offerings by creating a series of floral gift collections. Winston Flowers' floral gift collections change nine times per year and are tied to seasons and occasions, including winter, Valentine's Day, spring, Mother's Day, late spring, summer, late summer, autumn, and holiday. Additional collections include the Luxe Collection, Plant Collection, Gourmet Collection, as well as weekly or monthly subscriptions. All floral designs are arranged in vessels and containers imported from all over the globe.

Permanent collections include Sympathy, Roses, and Baby Baskets.

Mother's Day is the busiest floral holiday of the year for Winston Flowers, followed by Valentine's Day.

Other services include corporate, residential, holiday décor, and wedding and special events.

== Philanthropy ==
In 2010, Winston Flowers launched a philanthropic platform called Charity in Bloom. Each month, 20% of the purchase price of a custom-designed floral arrangement is donated to a different non-profit organization. The initiative launched with Boston, Massachusetts-based Perkins School for the Blind as its first partner organization. Other recipients include the Breast Cancer Research Foundation (national); Greater Boston Food Bank (Boston) and City Harvest (New York); and Boys & Girls Clubs (Boston) and Madison Square Boys & Girls Clubs (New York) and all share a common focus on health and wellness, medical research, and/or mentorship.
