= West Roxbury Parkway =

Parkway in Boston, Massachusetts

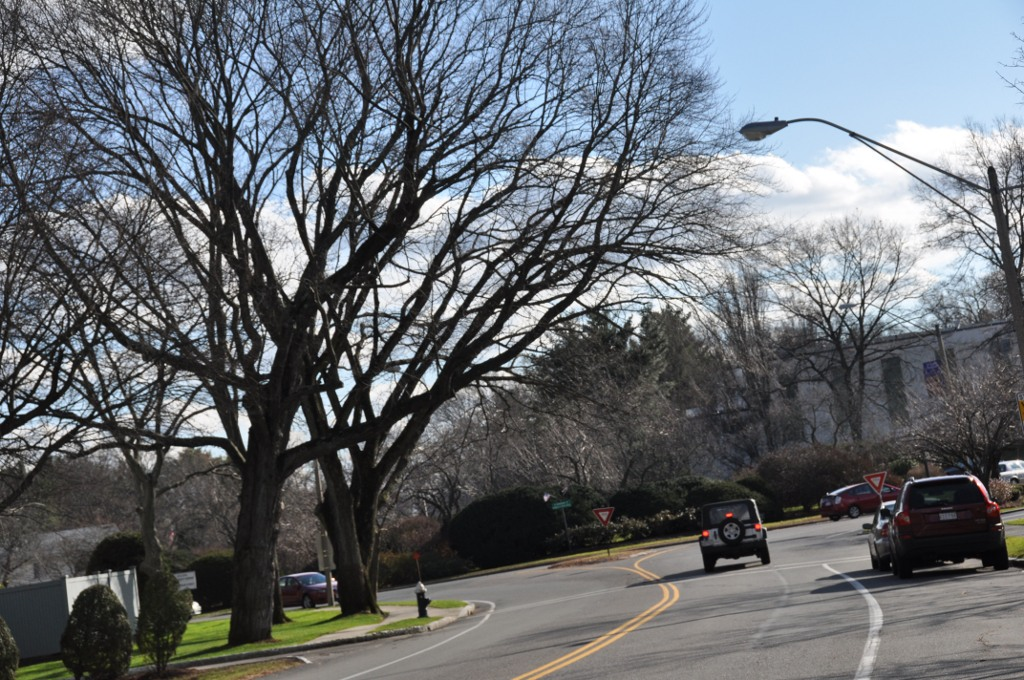
- The parkway approaching a rotary in West Roxbury
- Interactive map of West Roxbury Parkway
- Maintained by: Boston Transportation Department
- Length: 2.6 mi (4.2 km)
- Location: Boston, Massachusetts (West Roxbury and Chestnut Hill neighborhoods)
- South end: Washington Street / Enneking Parkway in West Roxbury
- North end: Newton Street in Chestnut Hill
- West Roxbury Parkway, Metropolitan Park System of Greater Boston
- U.S. National Register of Historic Places
- U.S. Historic district
- Location within Massachusetts Location within the United States
- Location: Brookline and Boston, Massachusetts
- Coordinates: 42°18′10″N 71°9′11″W
- Built: 1919
- Architect: Eliot, Charles
- MPS: Metropolitan Park System of Greater Boston MPS
- NRHP reference No.: 05001528
- Added to NRHP: January 19, 2006

West Roxbury Parkway is a historic parkway running from Washington Street in Boston, Massachusetts, where the Enneking Parkway runs south, to Horace James Circle in Chestnut Hill, where it meets the Hammond Pond Parkway. The parkway serves as a connector between Stony Brook Reservation and Hammond Pond Reservation (via Hammond Pond Parkway). West Roxbury Parkway was built between 1919 and 1929 and added to the National Register of Historic Places in 2006. The parkway is distinctive in the roadway system developed by the Metropolitan District Commission beginning around the turn of the 20th century in that it was built in collaboration with the City of Boston, and is maintained by the city.

At the northern end of the Stony Brook Reservation, the parkway runs through Bellevue Hill Park. The boundary roads of Bellevue Hill Park (Bellevue Hill Road, East Border Road, and West Border Road), which flank the parkway, are also listed as contributing properties to the West Roxbury Parkway.

The West Roxbury Parkway also intersects with the Veterans of Foreign Wars Parkway.

== History ==
Although land was taken for the construction of the parkway as early as 1894, construction did not begin on its southernmost section until 1919, when the section from Washington Street to Belgrade Avenue was built. It was extended to Centre Street in 1920, providing access via that road to the Arnold Arboretum, one of the city's objectives in the development of the parkway. The segment to Weld Street was completed in 1924, and the last section, to its terminus at Newton Street in Brookline, was completed in 1929. In 1924 construction of Bellevue Hill Road (originally called West Border Road) was completed.

During the 1930s four rotaries were built on the parkway in order to improve traffic flow with the major cross streets: Centre Street, the VFW Parkway, Grove Street, and Newton Street in Brookline. The last of these is considered a part of the Hammond Pond Parkway, and does not contribute to this parkway's historic designation.

== Major intersections ==
The entire route is in Boston, Suffolk County.

Location	mi	km	Destinations	Notes
West Roxbury	0.0	0.0	Washington Street / Enneking Parkway south – Dedham, Forest Hills, Boston	
West Roxbury/Chestnut Hill border	1.6	2.6	VFW Parkway – Downtown Boston, Cambridge	
Chestnut Hill	2.6	4.2	Newton Street	To Hammond Pond Parkway
1.000 mi = 1.609 km; 1.000 km = 0.621 mi

== See also ==
- National Register of Historic Places listings in southern Boston, Massachusetts
- National Register of Historic Places listings in Brookline, Massachusetts
- National Register of Historic Places listings in Norfolk County, Massachusetts
- National Register of Historic Places listings in Suffolk County, Massachusetts
