= Hammond Pond Parkway =

Parkway in Newton and Brookline, Massachusetts

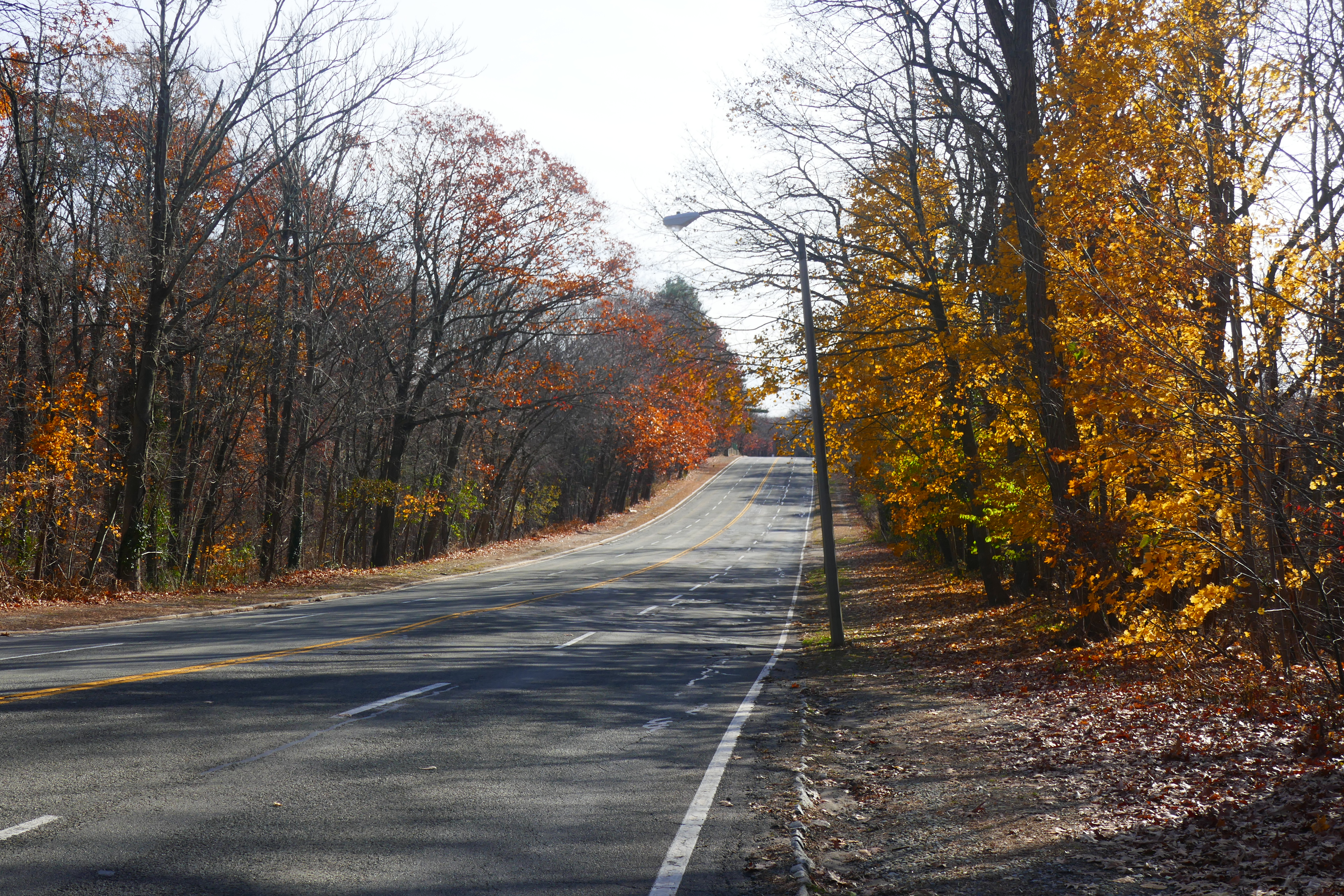
- Interactive map of Hammond Pond Parkway
- Maintained by: Department of Conservation and Recreation
- Length: 2.0 mi (3.2 km)
- Location: Hammond Pond Reservation, Massachusetts
- South end: Newton Street in Brookline
- Major junctions: Route 9 in Newton
- North end: Beacon Street in Newton
- Hammond Pond Parkway
- U.S. National Register of Historic Places
- U.S. Historic district
- Location within Massachusetts Location within the United States
- Location: Chestnut Hill, Massachusetts
- Coordinates: 42°19′16″N 71°10′21″W
- Area: 14 acres (5.7 ha)
- Built: 1928
- Architect: Eliot, Charles; Olmsted Brothers
- MPS: Metropolitan Park System of Greater Boston MPS
- NRHP reference No.: 04000250
- Added to NRHP: March 18, 2004

Hammond Pond Parkway is a historic parkway in Chestnut Hill, Massachusetts. The road, built in 1932, extends 2 miles (3.2 km) from Hobart Road (at Beacon Street) in Newton to Horace James Circle in Brookline, where it joins the West Roxbury Parkway. It was designed by Charles Eliot and the Olmsted Brothers to provide a parkway setting that provided access from Brookline, Newton, and the western portions of Boston to the southern parks of the Emerald Necklace. The parkway was listed on the National Register of Historic Places in 2004.

== Route description ==
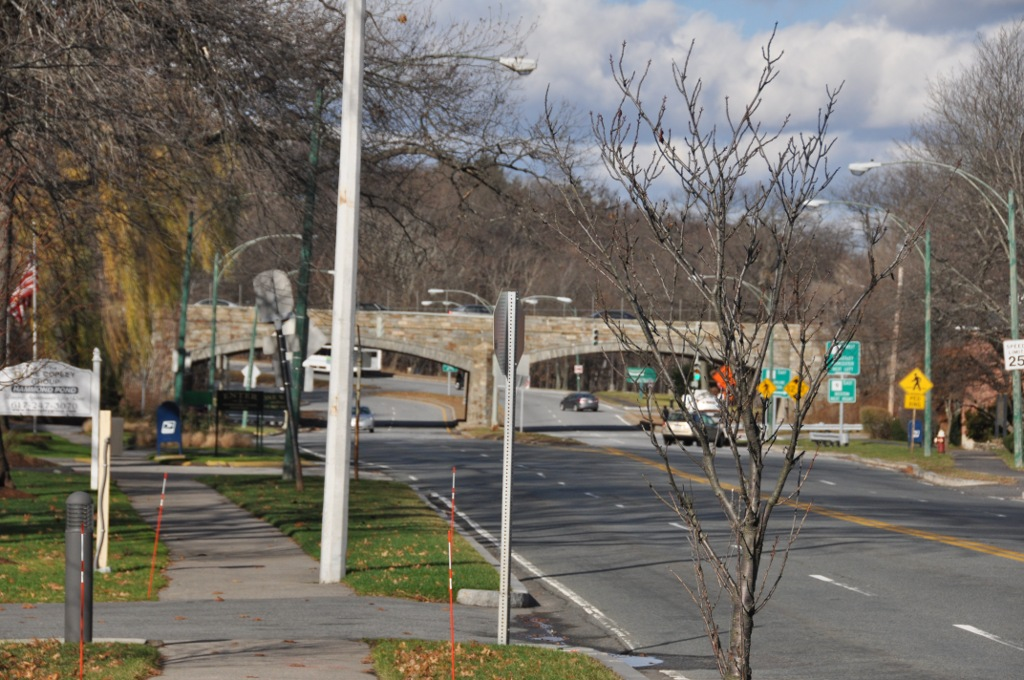
The intersection with Rte 9

The roadway is generally two lanes of paved asphalt. From its northern end at Beacon Street, it runs for roughly two-thirds of a mile with no intersections while passing through a conservation area consisting of the Hammond Pond Reservation and the Webster Conservation Area. It crosses the MBTA Green Line D branch, formerly the Highland branch of the Boston and Albany Railroad, along the way, and has at grade intersections for Boston College's Robstein Art Center, The Shops at Chestnut Hill and The Street Chestnut Hill before reaching an interchange with Massachusetts Route 9 at roughly its midpoint.

To the south of the malls, apartment and condominium buildings are on both sides. Farther to the south, the east side of the parkway has a residential area of larger homes with expansive lawns, while the west side is adjacent to the DCR Lost Pond Reservation and the Town of Brookline's Skyline Park. The parkway ends at Horace James Circle, a junction with the West Roxbury Parkway, Newton Street, LaGrange Street, and Hammond Street.

== History ==
Land acquisition for the parkway began in 1914 based on designs that were drafted in 1913. Additional land was acquired in 1920, and again in 1930-31. The northern section, between Beacon Street and Route 9, was built in 1931, and the southern section was completed in 1932. Construction was by the M. McDonough Company, and cost over $216,000. Only minor changes have been made to the parkway since its construction. The parkway construction included two significant bridges: the Route 9 overpass, and the bridge which passes over the railroad tracks.

In 2021, the Department of Conservation and Recreation proposed to redesign the portion of the parkway north of Route 9. The redesigned parkway would have just one traffic lane in each direction. A 12-foot-wide shared-use lane for bicycles and pedestrians would be built on the west side of the roadway, separated from the traffic lanes by a landscaped median.

== Major intersections ==
County	Location	mi	km	Destinations	Notes
Norfolk	Brookline	0.0	0.0	Newton Street / Lagrange Street	Traffic circle; to West Roxbury Parkway
Middlesex	Newton	0.9	1.4	Route 9 – Boston, Wellesley	Interchange with Boylston Street
Middlesex	Newton	2.0	3.2	Beacon Street	
1.000 mi = 1.609 km; 1.000 km = 0.621 mi

== See also ==
- National Register of Historic Places listings in Newton, Massachusetts
