= Hammond House (Newton, Massachusetts) =

Historic house in Massachusetts, United States

- U.S. National Register of Historic Places
- U.S. Historic district – Contributing property
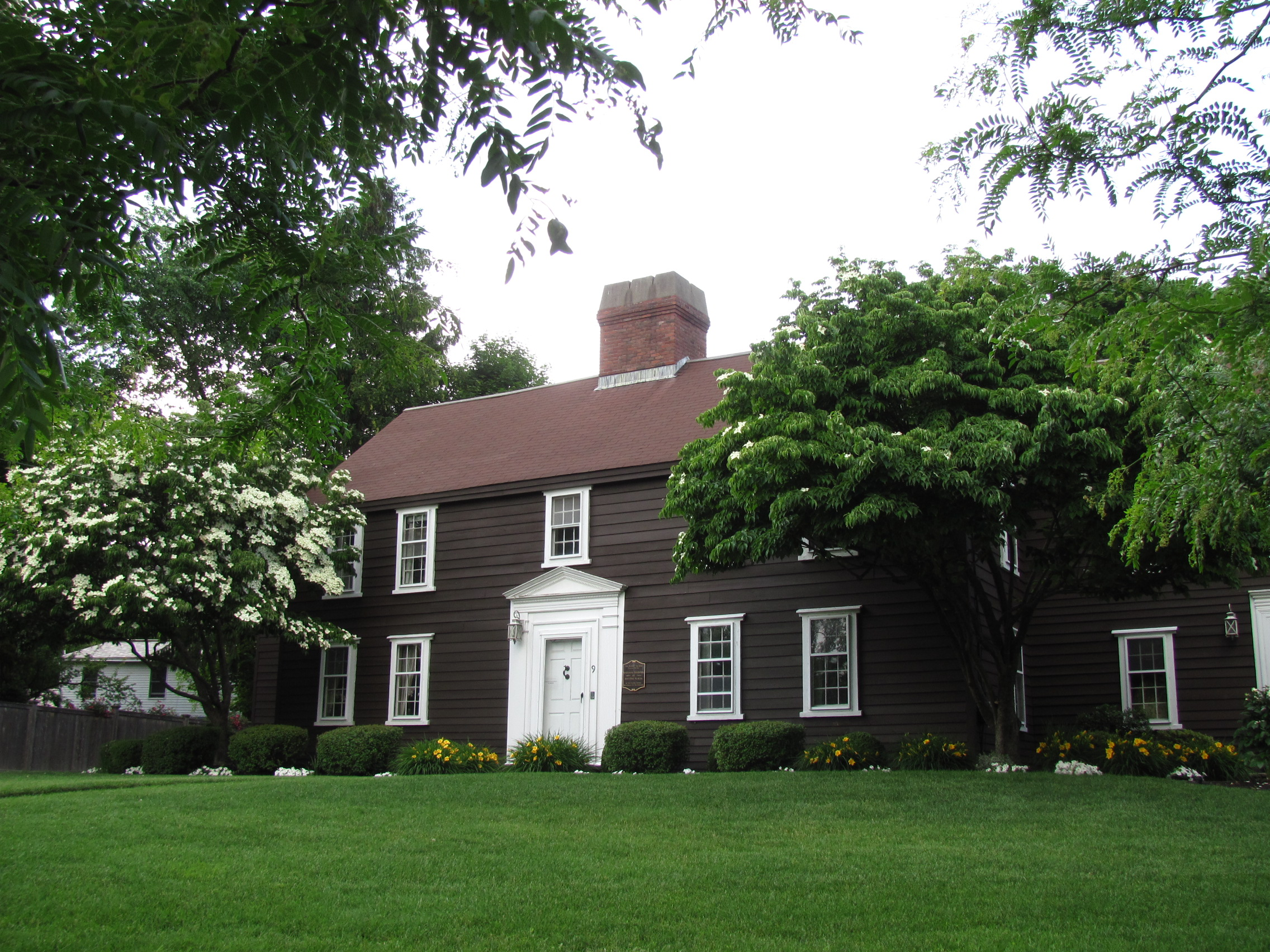
- Hammond House

- Location within Massachusetts Location within the United States
- Location: 9 Old Orchard Rd., Newton, Massachusetts
- Coordinates: 42°19′56.7″N 71°10′22.3″W
- Built: c. 1645-1730
- Architectural style: Colonial, First Period
- Part of: Old Chestnut Hill Historic District (ID86001756)
- MPS: First Period Buildings of Eastern Massachusetts TR
- NRHP reference No.: 90000175

Significant dates
- Added to NRHP: March 9, 1990
- Designated CP: September 4, 1986

The Hammond House is an historic house located at 9 Old Orchard Road in the village of Chestnut Hill in Newton, Massachusetts. With an estimated construction date of 1645-1730, it is believed to be the oldest house in Newton. It is also a rare example of a First Period house that was started as a single cell (three bays with chimney behind one bay), that was expanded to five bays later in the First Period; such expansion usually took place later in the 18th century, during the Georgian period. The house has been extended multiple times over the intervening centuries; the original core now lies just east of the main entrance. The original house was built by Hon. Ebenezer Stone when he moved from the Stone homestead at Mount Auburn in Watertown.

The house was listed on the National Register of Historic Places in 1990. In the early 2020s the house was remodeled, a project that entailed removing most of the historic interior finishes and the creation of a non-historic contemporary aesthetic.

== See also ==
- National Register of Historic Places listings in Newton, Massachusetts
- List of the oldest houses in Massachusetts
