= Chestnut Hill, Virginia =

Chestnut Hill, Virginia may refer to:

- Chestnut Hill, King George County, Virginia
- Chestnut Hill (Leesburg, Virginia)
- Chestnut Hill, Richmond County, Virginia
