= Stony Brook Reservation Parkways =

Roads in Greater Boston, Massachusetts

- Stony Brook Reservation Parkways, Metropolitan Park System of Great Boston MPS
- U.S. National Register of Historic Places
- U.S. Historic district
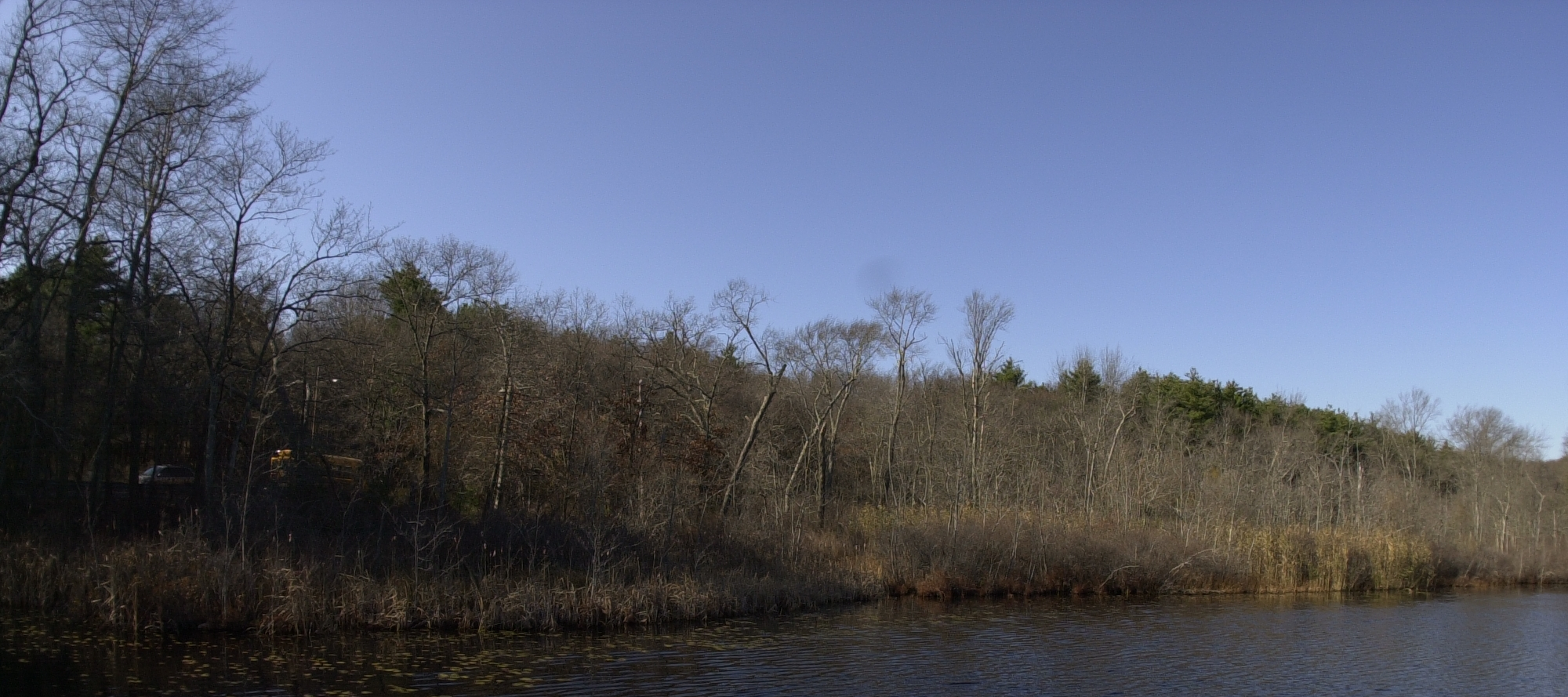
- Turtle Pond, with the Enneking Parkway in the background

- Location within Massachusetts Location within the United States
- Location: Dedham, Enneking, Turtle Pond Parkways, Smith Field, Reservation, W. Border Rds., Boston and Dedham, Massachusetts
- Coordinates: 42°15′58.5″N 71°8′38″W
- Area: 21.3 acres (8.6 ha)
- Built: 1894
- Architect: Eliot, Charles; Olmsted Bros.
- MPS: Metropolitan Park System of Greater Boston MPS
- NRHP reference No.: 05001509
- Added to NRHP: January 3, 2006

The Stony Brook Reservation Parkways are a group of historic parkways in Boston and Dedham, Massachusetts. They provide access to and within the Stony Brook Reservation, a Massachusetts state park. The roadways and the park are administered by the Massachusetts Department of Conservation and Recreation, a successor to the Metropolitan District Commission, which oversaw their construction. The roads consist of the Dedham, Enneking, and Turtle Pond Parkways and West Boundary Road. Two roads within the park, Smithfield Road and Reservation Road, are listed as non-contributing properties. The park roads were built between 1894 and 1956, and were listed on the National Register of Historic Places in 2006.

== West Boundary Road ==
When it was built in 1928, West Boundary Road skirted the western boundary of the reservation, running from Washington Street in the north to Turtle Pond Parkway in the south. This route is now interrupted by a housing development, and the southern end of the roadway ends after 0.8 miles (1.3 km) at Georgetowne Drive. Most of the rest of its former alignment has been converted to a wide hiking path.

== Dedham Parkway ==
The reservation's three main parkways meet at a junction within the park known as the Robert Bleakie Intersection, located in the southern part of the park. The Dedham Parkway, a two-lane road, extends southwest from this junction, exiting the park soon afterward. It passes a junction with Georgetowne Drive, and then with Alwin Street, before crossing into Dedham and reaching its southern terminus, a junction with Harding Terrace (the cross street), and Dedham Boulevard (its southerly continuation). The parkway was built in stages, in 1900 and 1912.

== Turtle Pond Parkway ==
Turtle Pond Parkway was built in 1897, and extends southeast from the Bleakie Intersection. It is, like the Dedham Parkway, a two-lane road. It eventually skirts the southwestern edge of the reservation, passing through an intersection with Smithfield Road and Alwin Street. It continues roughly southward, passing the southern tip of the reservation before reaching Boston's Mill Pond Reservation, and its own terminus at a junction with River Street. River Street provides a connection (on the far side of Mill Pond Reservation) to the Neponset Valley Parkway.

== Enneking Parkway ==
The Enneking Parkway, built in 1897, extends north and east from the Bleakie Intersection. The northern leg extends through much of the reservation, eventually reaching its northern terminus with Washington Street and the West Roxbury Parkway, which continues northward. The eastern leg reaches a junction with West Smithfield Road, before turning into East Boundary Road near the Smith Pond Playground.

== See also ==
- National Register of Historic Places listings in Norfolk County, Massachusetts
- National Register of Historic Places listings in southern Boston, Massachusetts
