= Chestnut Hill (Orange, Virginia) =

Historic house in Virginia, United States

- U.S. National Register of Historic Places
- Virginia Landmarks Register
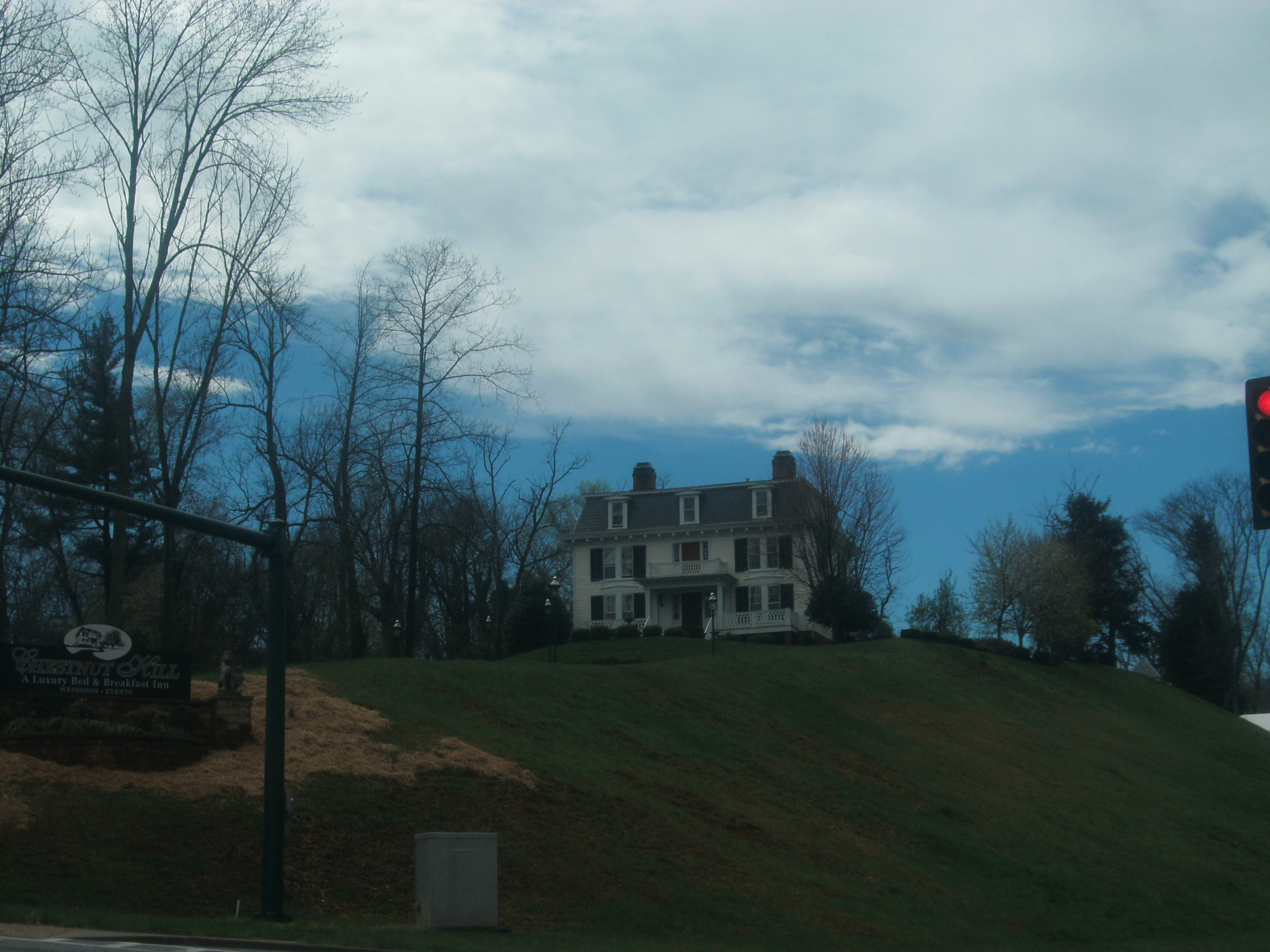
- Chestnut Hill, April 2017

- Location within Virginia Location within the United States
- Location: 236 Caroline St., Orange, Virginia
- Coordinates: 38°14′27″N 78°6′52″W
- Area: 3 acres (1.2 ha)
- Built: 1860
- Built by: Daley, Alexander
- Architectural style: Greek Revival, Italianate
- NRHP reference No.: 09000417
- VLR No.: 275-0016

Significant dates
- Added to NRHP: June 11, 2009
- Designated VLR: March 19, 2009

Chestnut Hill is a historic home located at Orange, Orange County, Virginia. It was built about 1860, and is a two-story, frame dwelling in a combination of the Italianate and Greek Revival styles. A Second Empire style mansard roof was added in 1891. The front facade features a central, one-story, one-bay porch with a balustraded deck above and balustraded decks with the same scroll-sawn balusters across the front. The historic floor plan is a double-pile center-passage plan with two interior chimneys serving four fireplaces on each floor. The house was moved to a new location, 150 feet away from its original site, when threatened with demolition in 2003. Also on the property is a small, one-story, single-bay, 19th-century contributing shed.

It was listed on the National Register of Historic Places in 2009.
