= Chestnut Hill Branch =

Chestnut Hill Branch refers to the following rail lines:

- Chestnut Hill Branch (Pennsylvania Railroad), now the Chestnut Hill West Branch
- Chestnut Hill Branch (Reading Company), now the Chestnut Hill East Branch
