= The Street Chestnut Hill =

Shopping mall near Boston, Massachusetts, U.S.

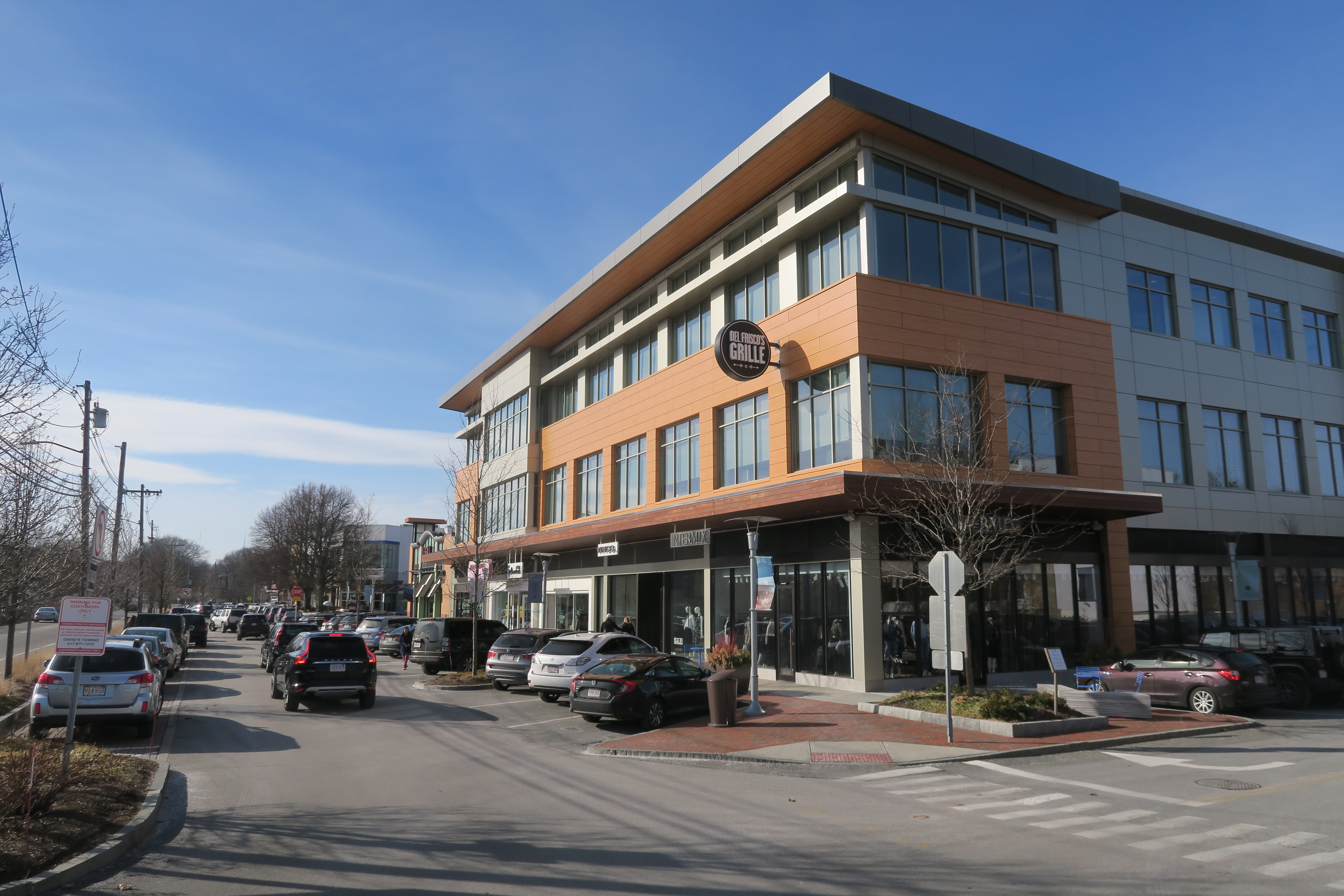
- The Street Chestnut Hill
- Location: Chestnut Hill, Massachusetts, United States
- Coordinates: 42.3232°N 71.1682°W
- Opened: sections have been open since May 2012, other areas still under development
- Developer: WS Development
- Owner: WS Development
- Floor area: 640,090 sq ft (59,466 m^{2})
- Floors: Two, three in some locations
- Website: thestreetchestnuthill.com

The Street Chestnut Hill is an open-air shopping center on Route 9 in Chestnut Hill, Massachusetts. The shopping center contains 640,090 sq ft (59,466 m^{2}) of fashion retailers, restaurants, and entertainment options. The architecture and design of the new shopping center mimics modern village-like streetscapes and overlooks neighboring Hammond Pond. The center contains a Showcase SuperLux and a Star Market.

== History ==
In 1950, a development team from C&R Management, headed by Daniel Rothenberg and Julien Cohen, built a shopping center in Chestnut Hill, six miles (9.7 km) from Boston. Chestnut Hill Shopping Center began with a variety of shops, such as Filene's, Franklin Simon & Co., and London Harness Company, adjacent to a Star Market at the intersection of Route 9 and Hammond Street. On July 27, R.H. Stearns and S.S. Pierce opened in a separate building. In 1978, the Chestnut Hill Medical Center and Bloomingdale's opened in The Shops at Chestnut Hill.
