= Chestnut Hill station =

Chestnut Hill station may refer to:

- Chestnut Hill station (MBTA), Newton, Massachusetts
- Chestnut Hill Avenue station, Boston, Massachusetts
- Chestnut Hill East station, Philadelphia, Pennsylvania
- Chestnut Hill West station, Philadelphia, Pennsylvania
