= Chestnut Hill (Leesburg, Virginia) =

Coordinates: 39.247694°N 77.536685°W

Chestnut Hill is an 18th-century Federal-style mansion north of Leesburg in Loudoun County, Virginia, United States. Chestnut Hill was the home of Thomson Francis Mason (1785–21 December 1838), a prominent jurist, lawyer, councilman, judge, mayor of Alexandria, and grandson of Founding Father of the United States George Mason. Chestnut Hill was also the home of Mason's son, Dr. John "Frank" Francis Mason (28 August 1828–4 August 1897). It is located at 13263 Chestnut Hill Lane near Leesburg.

== History ==
It is hypothesized that Thomas George constructed a stucco-covered two-story fieldstone dwelling around 1766 prior to his purchase of the Chestnut Hill property. It was this structure that comprises the earliest section of the Chestnut Hill mansion. During the American Revolutionary War, Colonel Josias Clapham purchased 200 acres (0.81 km^{2}) of property on which stood the small Chestnut Hill dwelling. The fieldstone house was further expanded in size under Colonel Clapham's ownership. His son, Samuel Clapham, a representative for Loudoun County in the Virginia General Assembly from 1797 through 1799, acquired the house upon Colonel Clapham's death. Under his ownership, Samuel Clapham doubled the size of the house at Chestnut Hill.

The two-story fieldstone mansion was also considerably enlarged by Clapham's son-in-law, Thomson Francis Mason. Mason's wife Elizabeth Clapham Price Mason, known as Betsey, owned the Chestnut Hill property for 34 years until her death in 1873, although throughout most of her ownership she resided in Alexandria. By the early 1870s, Dr. John "Frank" Francis Mason was owner of Chestnut Hill and also enlarged the mansion. Chestnut Hill, along with the adjacent 20 acres (81,000 m^{2}), is currently for sale. It is believed that an original copy of the Virginia Declaration of Rights was stored at Chestnut Hill during the Mason family's ownership of the estate until it was sold to the National Archives and Records Administration in 1930.

== American Civil War ==
Following Union Army orders to burn Chestnut Hill, the mansion was saved due to the respect the officer in charge of carrying out the orders had for the Mason family name.

== Architecture ==
Chestnut Hill is a two-story Federal-style fieldstone house with interior end chimneys and a central-passage-double-pile-plan fieldstone addition. It is the oldest surviving structure of its kind in the area. The addition of a two-story flat-roofed portico and dormers were among the modifications made by Mr. and Mrs. Coleman C. Gore after they purchased the Chestnut Hill in 1930. The home features eleven fireplaces.
