= Old Chestnut Hill Historic District =

Historic district in Massachusetts, United States

- U.S. National Register of Historic Places
- U.S. Historic district
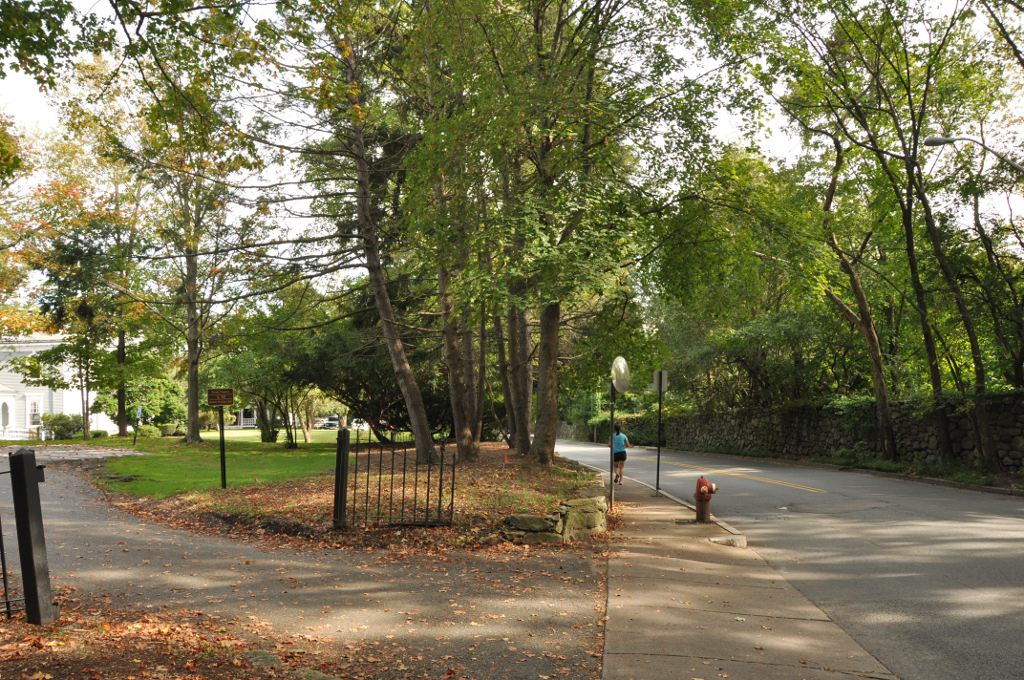
- View along Hammond Street

- Location within Massachusetts Location within the United States
- Location: Along Hammond St. and Chestnut Hill Rd. roughly bounded by Beacon St. and Essex Rd., and Suffolk Rd., Newton, Massachusetts
- Coordinates: 42°19′45″N 71°10′0″W
- Area: 98 acres (40 ha)
- Architect: Bosworth, Welles
- Architectural style: Colonial Revival, Italianate, Shingle Style
- MPS: Newton MRA
- NRHP reference No.: 86001756
- Added to NRHP: September 04, 1986

The Old Chestnut Hill Historic District encompasses the historic residential heart of the Newton portion of Chestnut Hill, Massachusetts. When first listed on the National Register of Historic Places in 1986, the district extended along Hammond Street, between Beacon Street and the MBTA Green Line right-of-way, and along Chestnut Hill Road between Hammond and Essex, including properties along a few adjacent streets. The district was expanded in 1990 to include more of Chestnut Hill Road and Essex Road, Suffolk Road and the roads between it and Hammond, and a small section south of the Green Line including properties on Hammond Street, Longwood Road, and Middlesex Road. A further expansion in 1999 added a single property on Suffolk Road.

The district consists of a residential enclave of high-quality architect-designed residences on ample, landscaped lots, that exemplified the development of Newton as a fashionable upper-class suburb. The area's colonial history begins with settlement in the 17th century by Thomas Hammond and others. Hammond was probably the builder of the c. 1700 Hammond House at 9 Old Orchard Road, considered to be Newton's oldest surviving structure. The 1723 house at 521 Hammond Street, a substantial Georgian style house, also belonged to the Hammond family.

Development of the area did not begin in a significant way until after 1886, when the Circuit Railroad brought rail service to the area. A station designed by H. H. Richardson was built at Chestnut Hill in 1883 and landscaped by Frederick Law Olmsted; it was demolished in 1960. The houses in the district are predominantly Colonial Revival in their styling, although other forms popular into the 1920s are also represented, including Tudor Revival. There has been only limited new construction in the area since 1942. The 98-acre (40 ha) district includes 132 buildings, of which 109 contribute to its significance.

== See also ==
- National Register of Historic Places listings in Newton, Massachusetts
- Chestnut Hill Historic District (Brookline, Massachusetts), which is mostly in Brookline but overlaps slightly into Newton
