= The Chestnut Hill =

- U.S. National Register of Historic Places
- U.S. Historic district – Contributing property
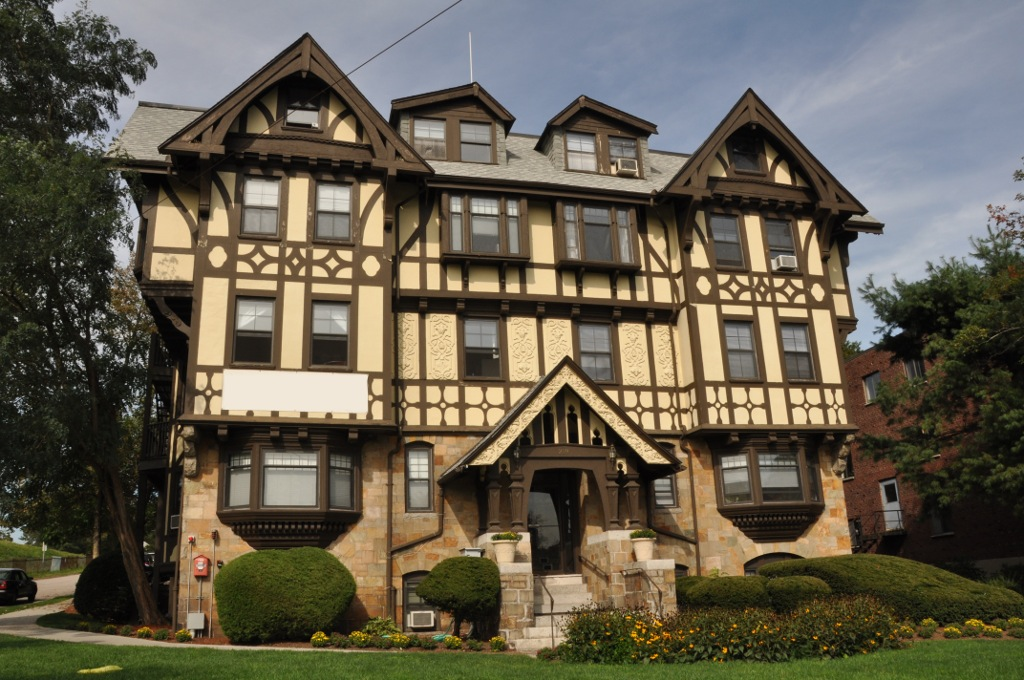

- Location within Massachusetts Location within the United States
- Location: 219 Commonwealth Avenue, Chestnut Hill, Newton, Massachusetts
- Coordinates: 42°20′16″N 71°10′31″W
- Built: 1899
- Part of: Commonwealth Avenue Historic District (ID90000012)
- NRHP reference No.: 86001782

Significant dates
- Added to NRHP: September 4, 1986
- Designated CP: February 16, 1990

The Chestnut Hill is a historic apartment building at 219 Commonwealth Avenue in the village of Chestnut Hill in Newton, Massachusetts, USA.

== History ==
Designed by the Boston architect Francis W. Chandler in the Tudor Revival style of architecture, it was built in 1899 for Dana Estes, one of the developers responsible for the extension of Commonwealth Avenue to Auburndale. On September 4, 1986, it was added to the National Register of Historic Places.

== Description ==
It is a 3 1/2-story wood-frame building with fieldstone on the ground floor, and a half-timbered stucco finish above. The wall surfaces are in places embellished by decorative mastic elements.

== See also ==
- National Register of Historic Places listings in Newton, Massachusetts
