= Chestnut Hill, Richmond, Virginia =

Unincorporated community in Virginia, US

Coordinates: 37°33′46″N 77°25′19″W

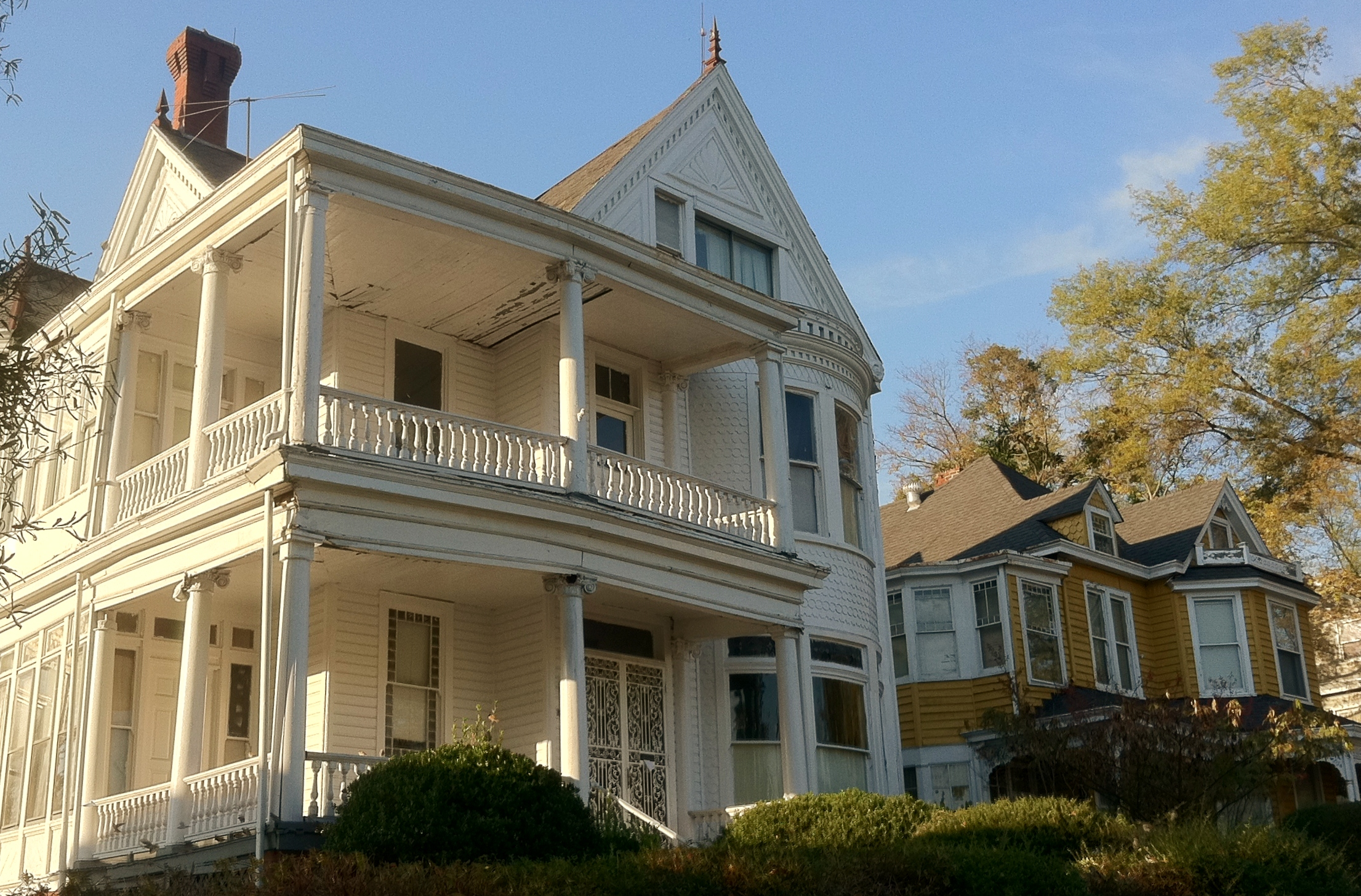
House in Chestnut Hill.

Chestnut Hill is an unincorporated community in the City of Richmond, in the U.S. state of Virginia.
