= Chestnut Hill Historic District (Brookline, Massachusetts) =

Historic district in Massachusetts, United States

- U.S. National Register of Historic Places
- U.S. Historic district
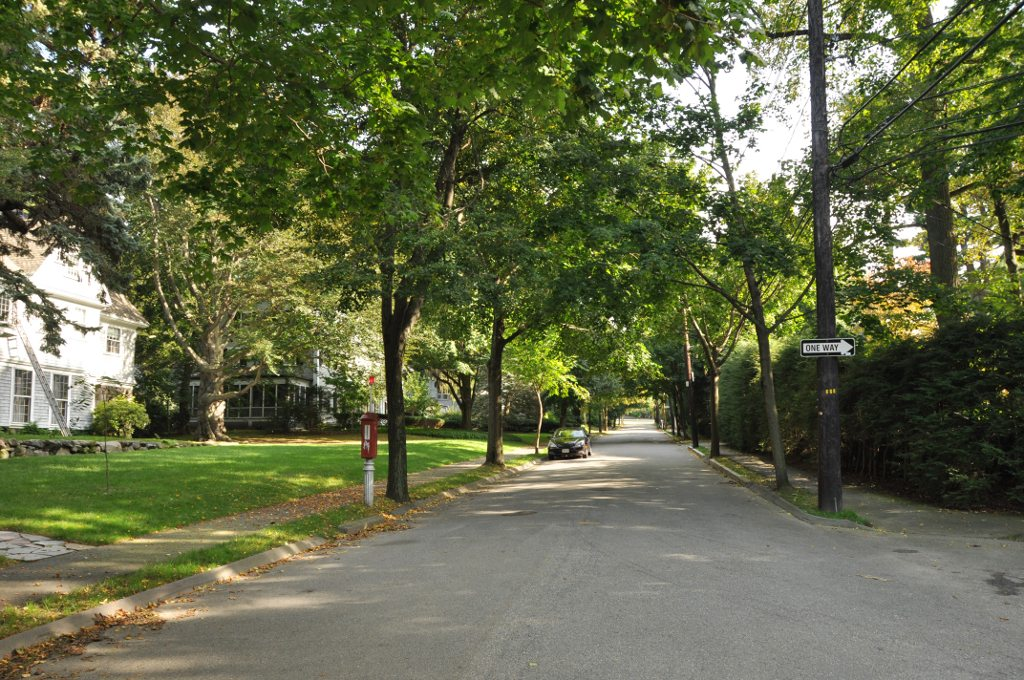

- Location within Massachusetts Location within the United States
- Location: Roughly bounded by Middlesex Rd., Reservoir Ln., Denny Rd., Boylston St. and Dunster Rd., Brookline, Massachusetts
- Coordinates: 42°19′36″N 71°9′32″W
- Area: 70 acres (28 ha)
- Architect: Chapman & Frazer; et al.
- Architectural style: Late 19th And 20th Century Revivals, Late Victorian
- MPS: Brookline MRA
- NRHP reference No.: 85003253
- Added to NRHP: October 17, 1985

The Chestnut Hill Historic District encompasses the historic portion of the village of Chestnut Hill that lies in Brookline, Massachusetts, with only slight overlap into adjacent Newton. The 70-acre (28 ha) district is bounded on the north by Middlesex Road, on the east by Reservoir Lane, on the south by Crafts Road and Massachusetts Route 9, and on the west by Dunster Road. A small portion of the district extends south of Route 9, including a few houses and the Baldwin School on Heath Street. The district was listed on the National Register of Historic Places on October 17, 1985.

The oldest portion of Chestnut Hill, including its colonial roots, lies just over the line in Newton, and was also the part of the village that was the first to be developed as a suburban residential area. When the Brookline section was being planned for development, Frederick Law Olmsted was consulted in 1888, but his plans were not executed. The area was developed between then and about 1920, with large, high-quality houses on well-proportioned lots. Most of the houses in the district are either Colonial Revival or Shingle in their styling; there are also a few earlier Queen Anne houses and a number of later Craftsman-style houses, especially in the Reservoir Lane area which was the last to be developed.

Several prominent area architectural firms were engaged in the development of properties in the district. Chapman & Frazer (later Chapman, Frazer & Blinn) were responsible for 29 of the more than 120 houses in the district; Horace Frazer lived in the district, at 471 Heath Street. Putnam & Cox designed seven homes, generally in the Arts and Crafts style, and William Putnam also lived in the district. Arthur Bowditch designed one house, as did the firm of Hartwell & Richardson.

== See also ==
- Old Chestnut Hill Historic District, encompassing the Newton portion of the village
- National Register of Historic Places listings in Brookline, Massachusetts
- National Register of Historic Places listings in Newton, Massachusetts
