= Chestnut Hill, Cumbria =

Coordinates: 54.599778°N 3.11823°W

Chestnut Hill
- Location in Allerdale, Cumbria Location within Cumbria
- Civil parish: Keswick
- Unitary authority: Cumberland
- Ceremonial county: Cumbria
- Region: North West
- Country: England
- Sovereign state: United Kingdom
- Post town: KESWICK
- Postcode district: CA
- Police: Cumbria
- Fire: Cumbria
- Ambulance: North West
- UK Parliament: Penrith and Solway

Chestnut Hill is a suburb of Keswick, England, located along the A591 road. It contains the Nether Place Nursing Home and Claremont House, a 19th-century lodge which is an AA 4 diamond hotel.
