= Hammond Pond Reservation =

Park in Newton, Massachusetts

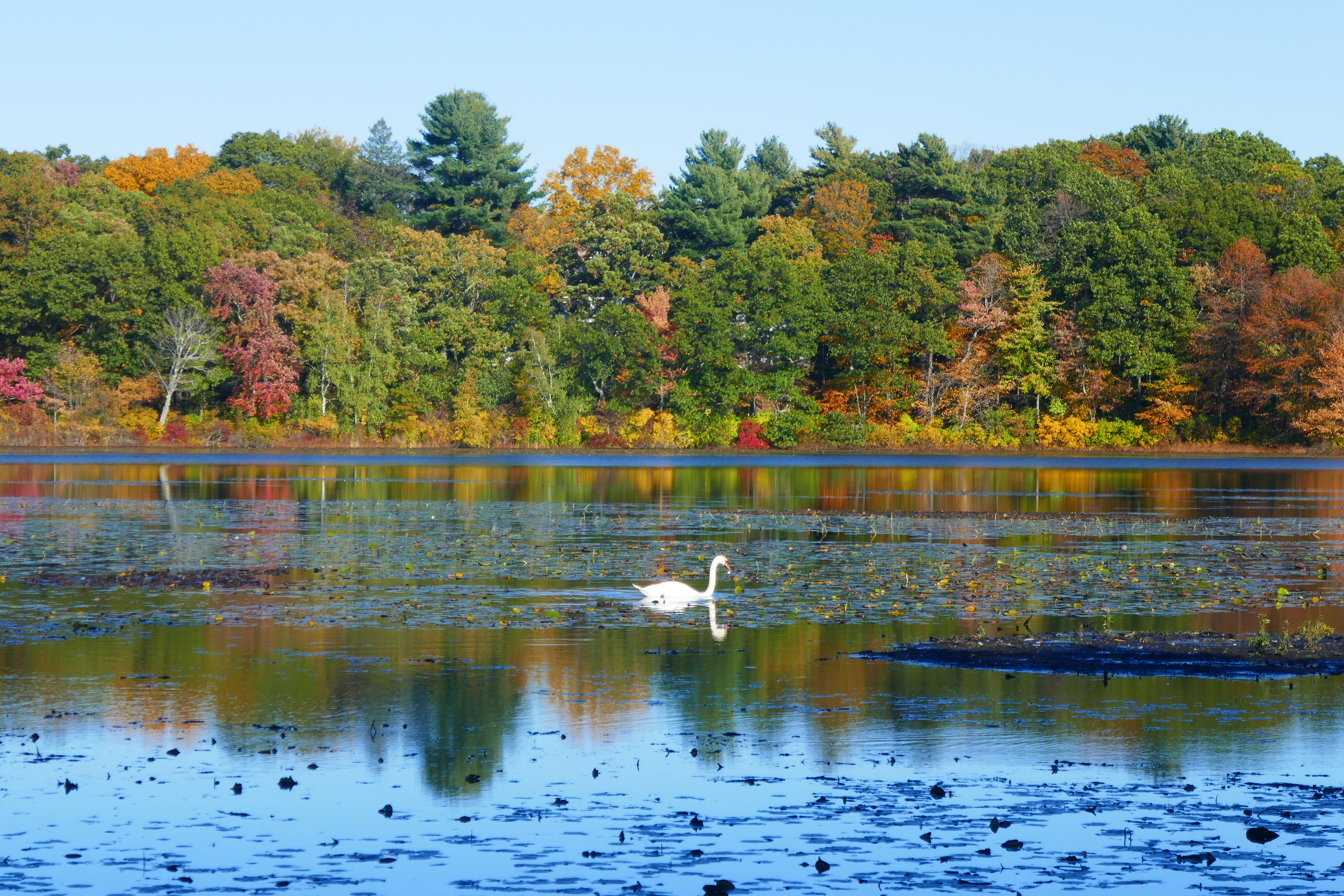

- Location within Greater Boston area Location within Massachusetts Location within the United States
- Location: Newton, Massachusetts, United States
- Coordinates: 42°19′28″N 71°10′15″W
- Area: 59 acres (24 ha)
- Elevation: 164 ft (50 m)
- Established: 1916
- Administrator: Massachusetts Department of Conservation and Recreation
- Website: Official website

Hammond Pond Reservation is a protected woodland park in Newton, Massachusetts. It features Hammond Pond, fishing and hiking trails as well as formations of sandstone conglomerate and Roxbury puddingstone which are popular for rock climbing.

The reservation is part of the Metropolitan Park System of Greater Boston. Its first parcel was acquired from John Lowell in 1916. Trails connect it to the adjacent Webster Woods and Houghton Garden. The MBTA Green Line (Riverside Branch) cuts through the connected park system from East to West, while Hammond Pond Parkway splits it from North to South.

Hammond Pond is listed as a Massachusetts "Great pond". The pond and reservation are named after the Hammond family, which settled in the area in the 17th century.

== Gallery ==
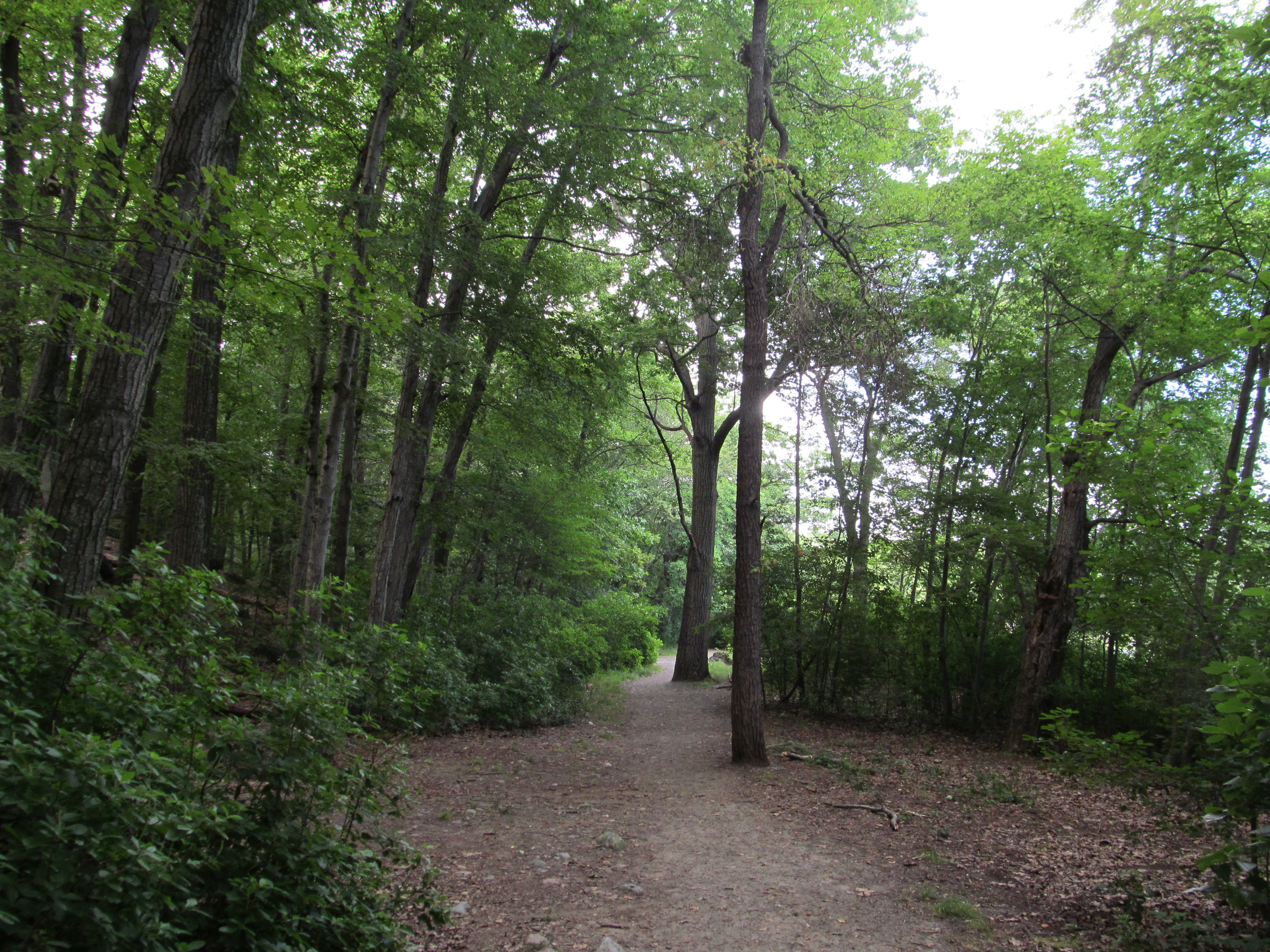
Walking trail

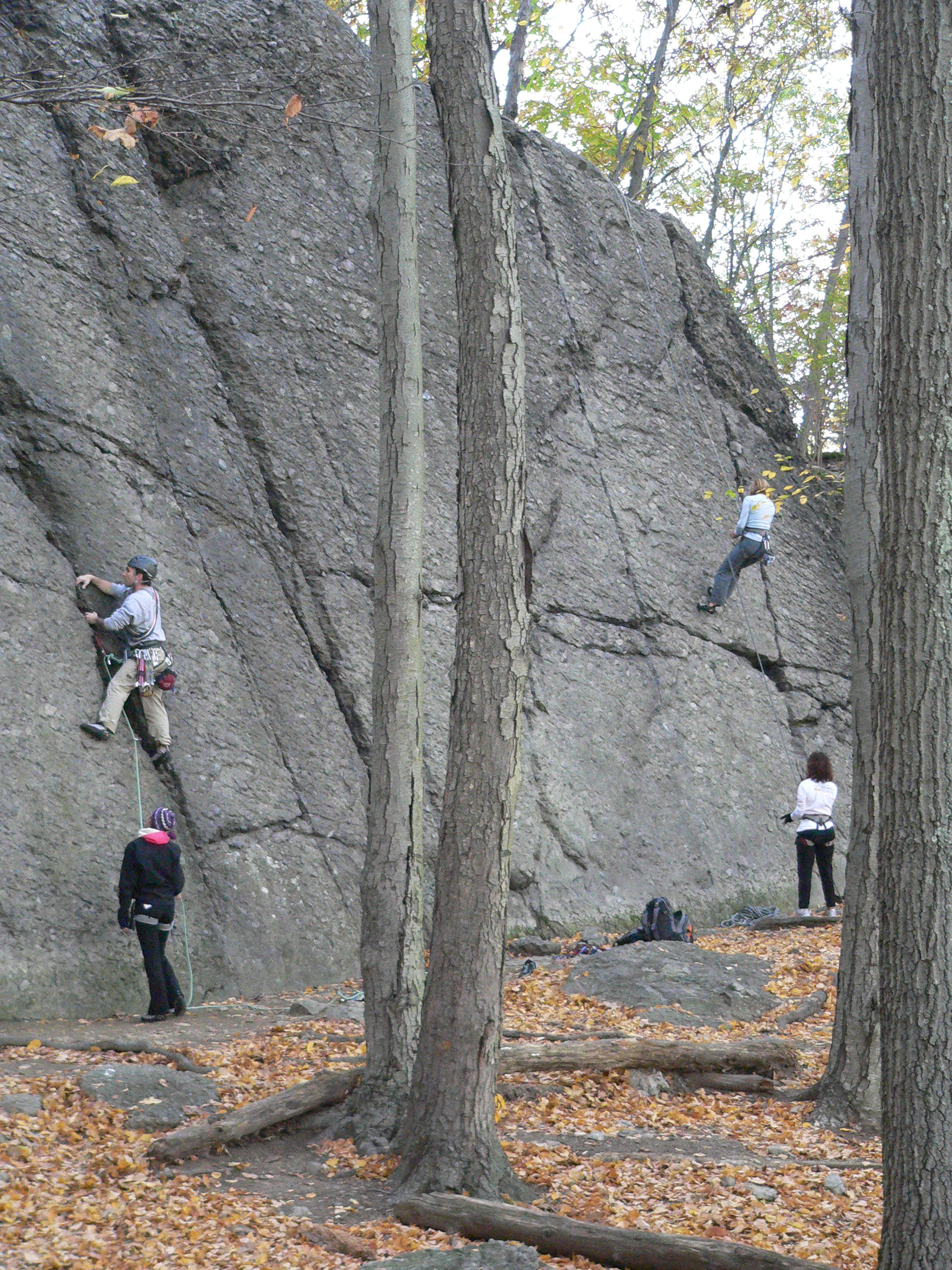
Rock climbing

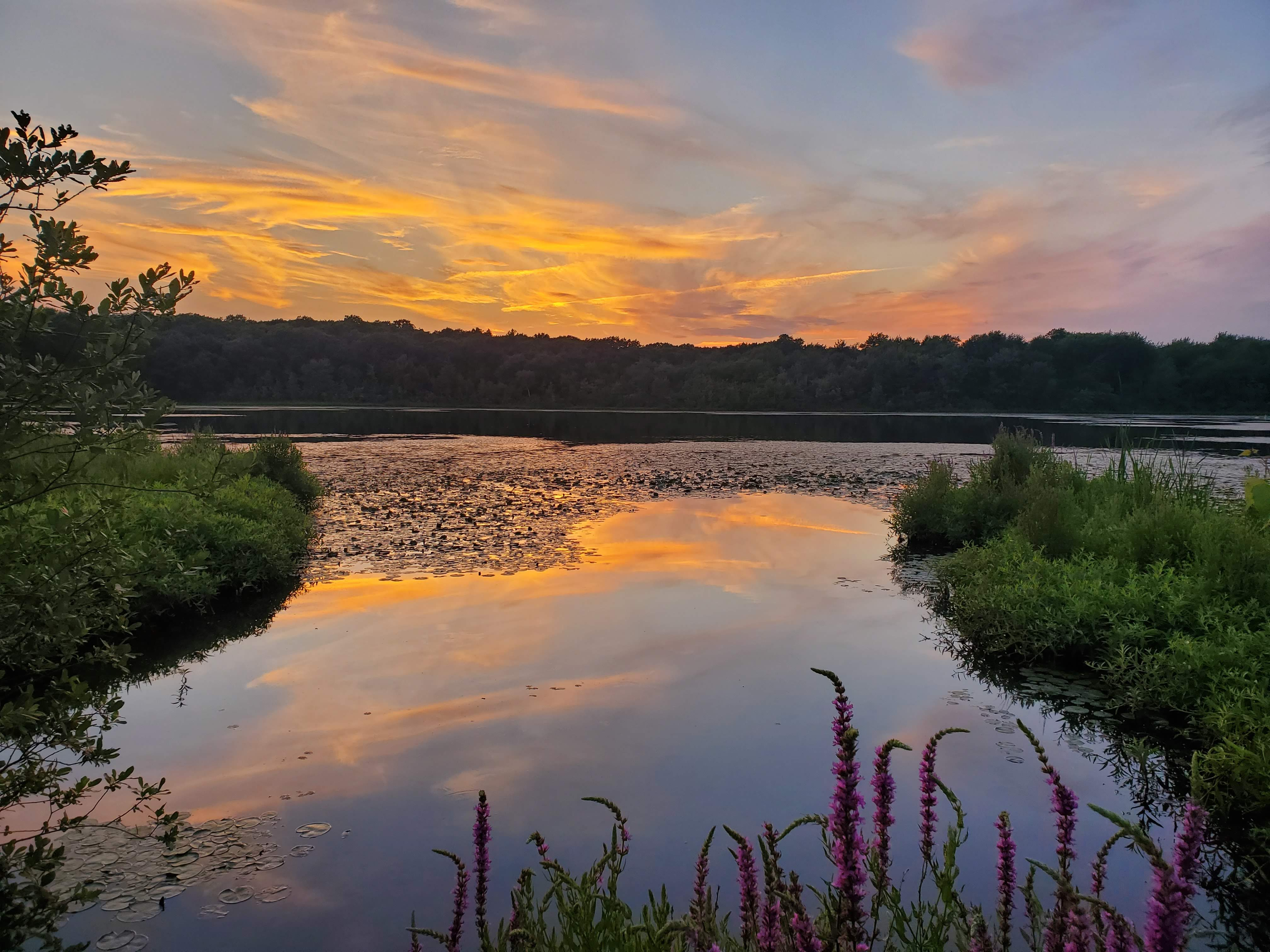
Sunset

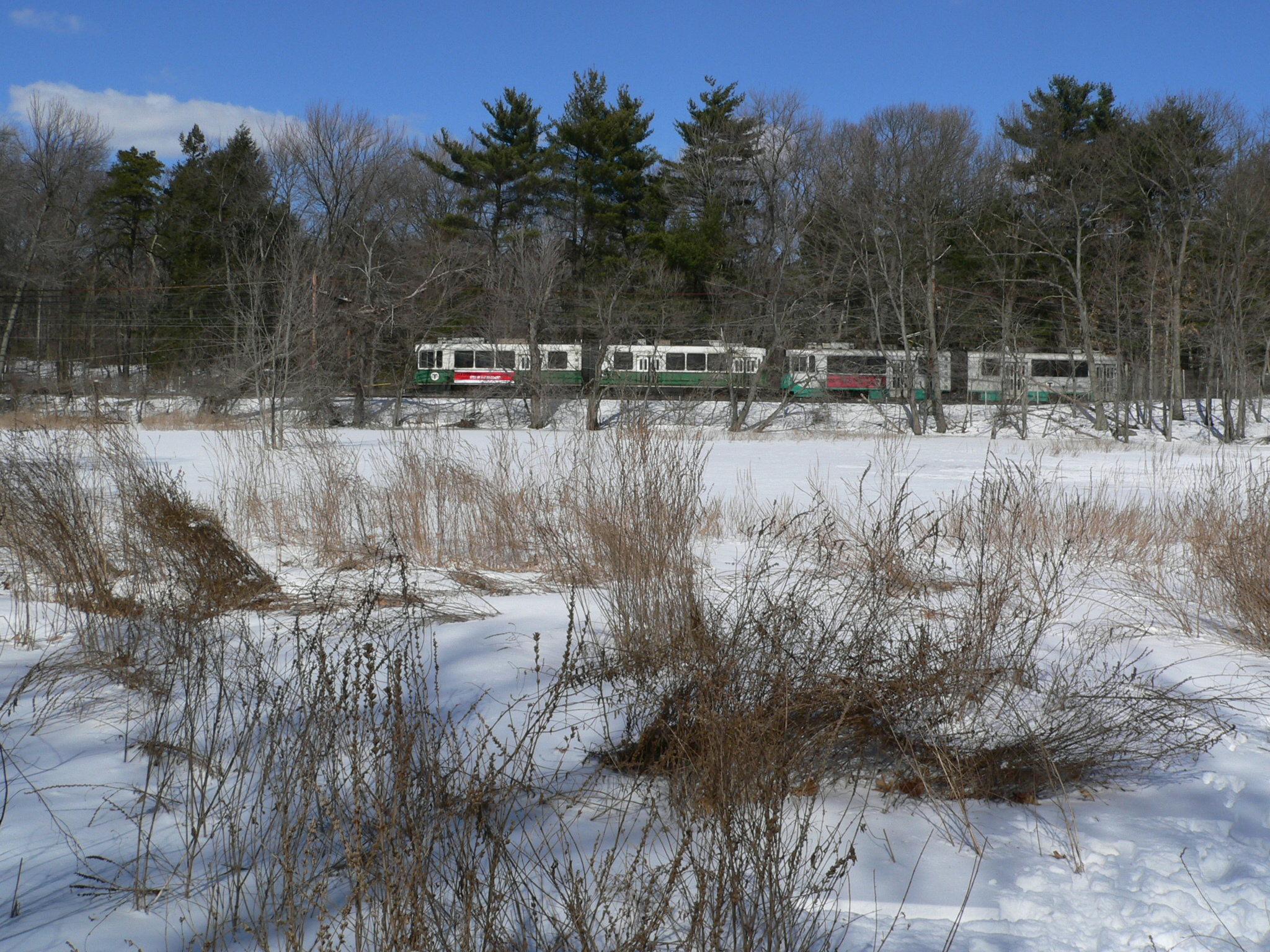
MBTA Green Line train

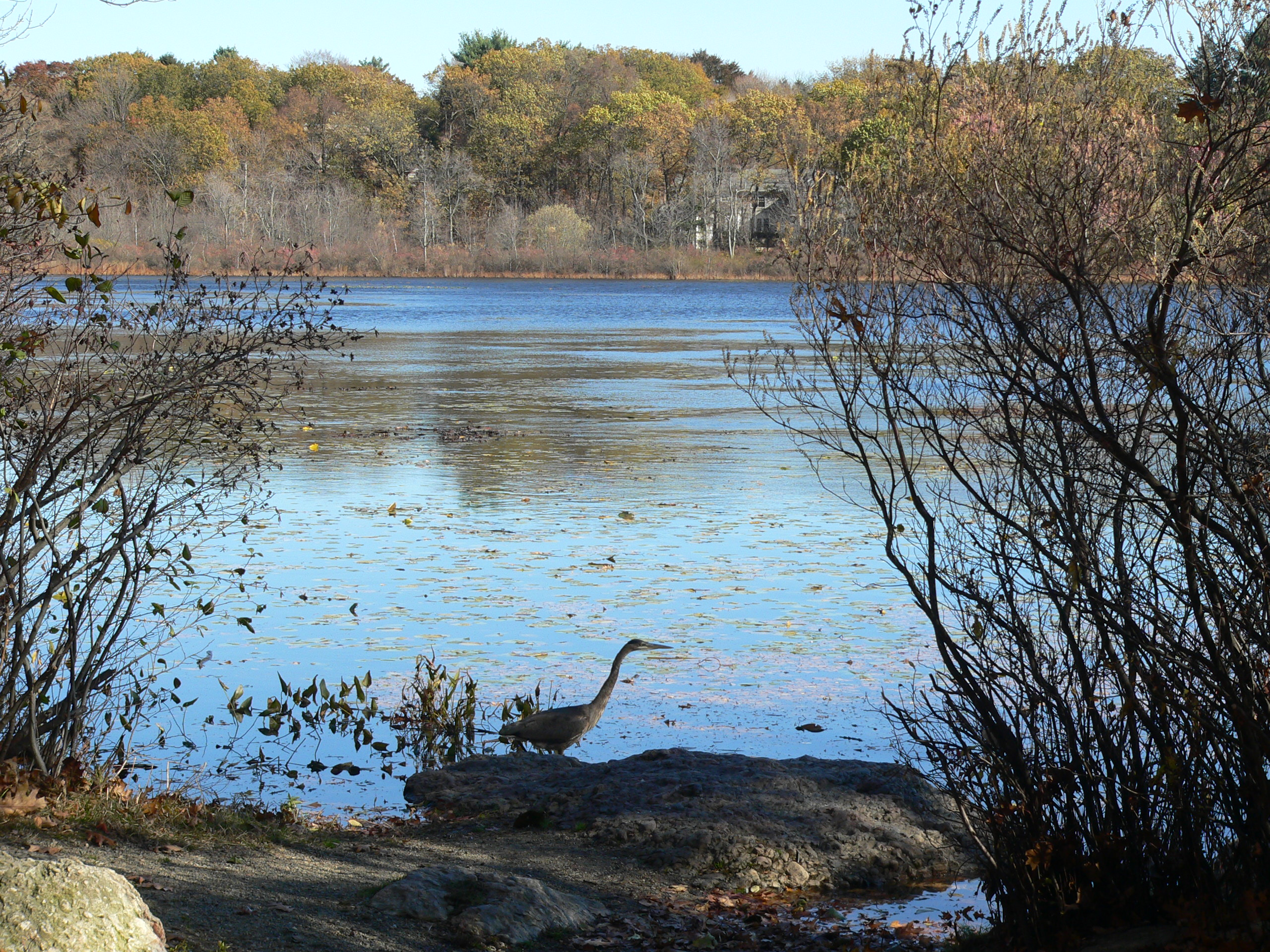
Great Blue Heron

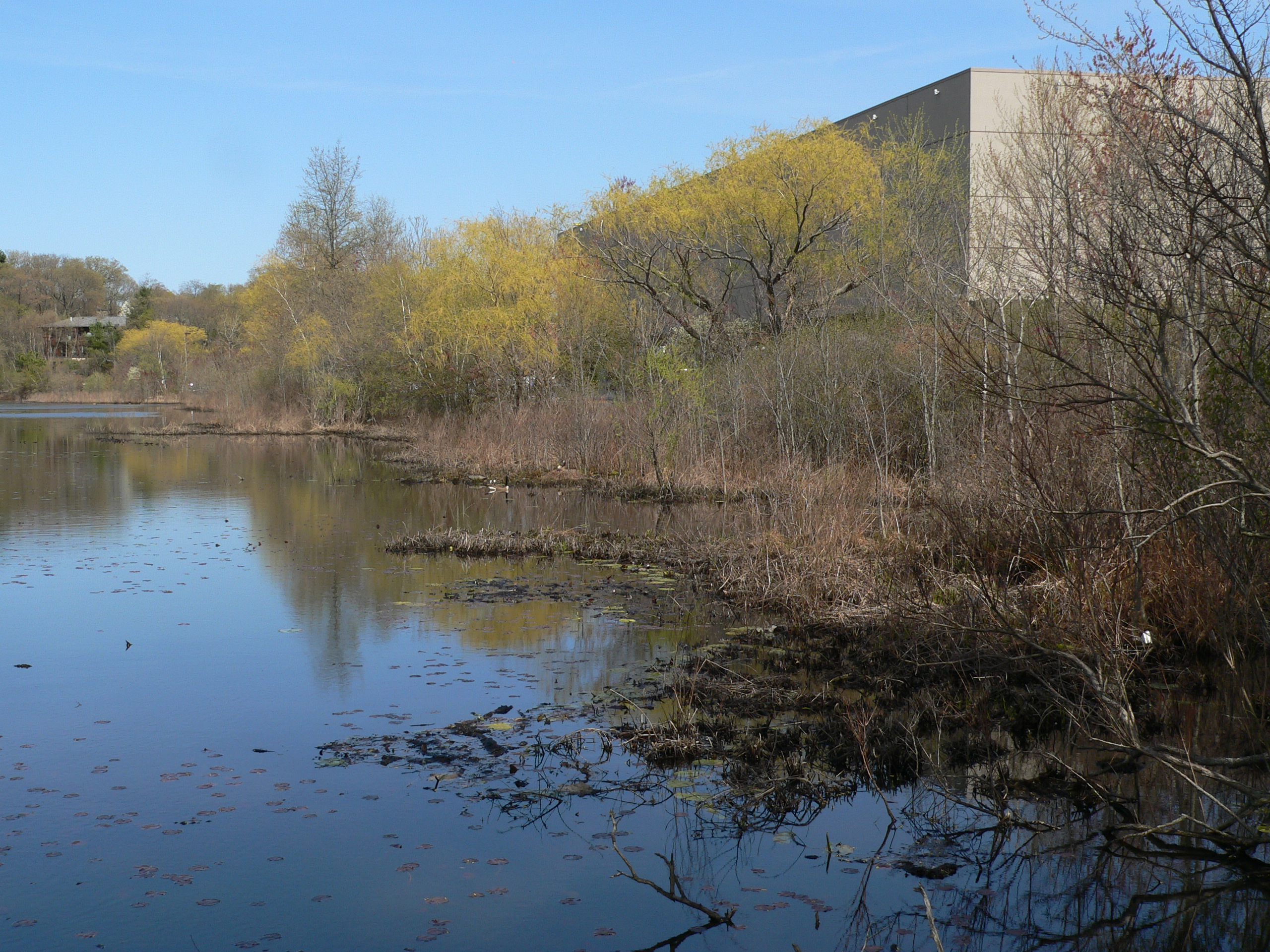
Hammond Pond and The Street at Chestnut Hill shopping center
