= The Shops at Chestnut Hill =

Shopping mall in Newton, Massachusetts

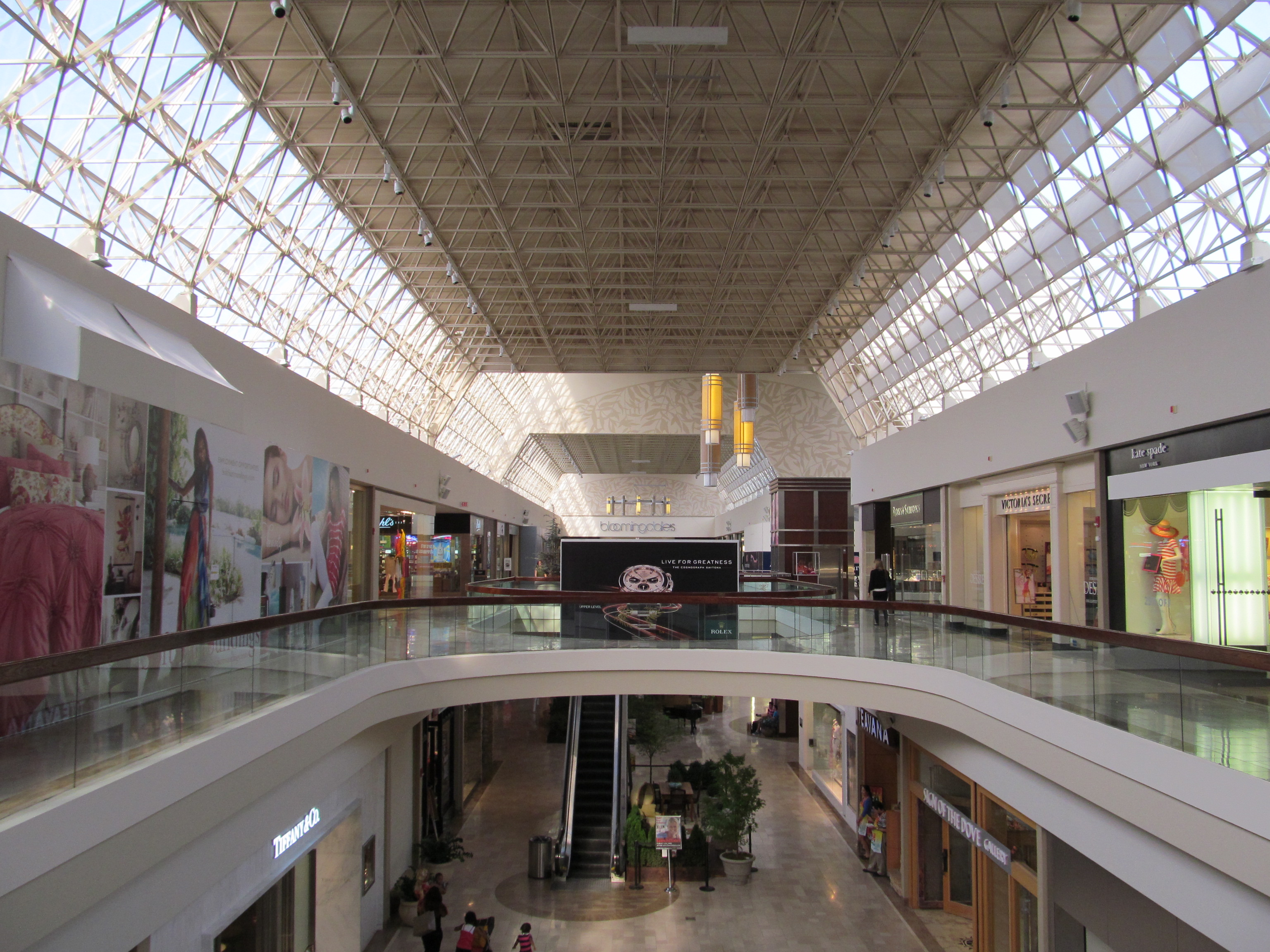
- The Shops at Chestnut Hill
- Location: Newton, Massachusetts
- Coordinates: 42°19′17.33″N 71°10′33.68″W
- Opened: 1974
- Developer: C&R Realty
- Owner: Simon Property Group (94.4%)
- Num. of stores: 55
- Num. of anchor tenants: 2
- Floor area: 470,094 ft^{2} (43,673.2 m^{2})
- Floors: 2 (3 in both Bloomingdale's locations)
- Parking: Free ample parking
- Website: www.simon.com/mall/the-shops-at-chestnut-hill

The Shops at Chestnut Hill is a two-level enclosed shopping mall, located in the Chestnut Hill section of Newton, Massachusetts, on Boylston Street (Route 9). It is managed by Simon Property Group, who owns 94.4% of it. As of 2022, the mall features two Bloomingdale's anchor tenants. Bloomingdale's Women's store is located at the west end of the complex and the Men's Home & Furnishing store anchoring the east end. These are the only Bloomingdale's locations in Massachusetts.

== History ==
=== 20th century ===
The Shops at Chestnut Hill, formerly known as The Mall at Chestnut Hill, was built into the side of a hill in 1974 and as such had ground level access on both of its two floors. A 70,000 ft^{2} (6,500 m^{2}) Bloomingdale's Home Furnishings store had opened at the site in 1973, while the two-story 180,000 ft^{2} (17,000 m^{2}) mall itself and a 123,000 ft^{2} (11,400 m^{2}) Filene's store opened in 1974. The Filene's had relocated from a neighboring 1950s-era location in the Chestnut Hill Shopping Center (which became the headquarters of General Cinema in 1975, later becoming the location of The Container Store and an AMC Theatres, which closed in 2012). Filene's expanded in size to 186,000 ft^{2} (17,300 m^{2}) in 1980 with the addition of a third floor, while the mall's Bloomingdale's home store added its own third floor and was reconfigured to include a men's department to complement a women's store it had opened across the street in 1978 at the Chestnut Hill Shopping Center.

In 1998 locally based S.R. Weiner & Associates assumed a long-term lease on the mall property from developer C&R Realty.

=== 21st century ===
In December 2001 S.R. Weiner in its turn assigned management as well as sold part of its leasehold in the mall to Rodamco North America, N.V. A few months later, with the break-up of Rodamco, Simon Property Group acquired management and an interest in the mall's leasehold.

The mall's structure and anchors remained essentially intact from 1980 until 2005, when May Department Stores (the then parent of Filene's) was acquired by Federated Department Stores (the owner of Bloomingdale's). In March 2006, Federated closed the Filene's store and spent the better part of the year renovating the space. In November 2006 Bloomingdale's relocated its Women's store from the adjacent Chestnut Hill Shopping Center to the former Filene's, thereby giving The Mall at Chestnut Hill a Bloomingdale's at both the east and west ends.

The mall was renovated in the fall of 2006 to coincide with the opening of the expanded Bloomingdale's. In addition to adding more chairs and sitting areas, a large handicapped-accessible elevator was installed in the central atrium close to the main, Route 9, entrance.

The first Massachusetts location of Frank Pepe Pizzeria Napoletana opened in December 2015 on the second level at the main entrance, at the location of the former Papa Razzi. A Simon-operated Starbucks opened Summer 2016 nearby, at the same entrance.
