= Chestnut Hill, Massachusetts =

Chestnut Hill
- Village
- Map of Chestnut Hill

- Location within Greater Boston area Location within Massachusetts Location within the United States
- Coordinates: 42°19′50″N 71°9′58″W
- Country: United States
- State: Massachusetts
- Counties: Middlesex, Norfolk, Suffolk
- ZIP Code: 02467

Chestnut Hill is a village located six miles (10 km) west of downtown Boston, Massachusetts, United States. It is best known for being home to Boston College and a section of the Boston Marathon route. Like all Massachusetts villages, Chestnut Hill is not an incorporated municipal entity. It is located partially in Brookline in Norfolk County, partially in the city of Boston in Suffolk County, and partially in the city of Newton in Middlesex County. Chestnut Hill's borders are defined by the 02467 ZIP Code. The name refers to several small hills that overlook the 135-acre (546,000 m^{2}) Chestnut Hill Reservoir rather than one particular hill.

== History ==
The boundary between Newton and Brighton was originally more or less straight northwest–southeast, following today's boundary at the east edge of the Newton Commonwealth Golf Course, and the west boundary of the MBTA rail yards. It followed what is today St. Thomas More Road and Chestnut Hill Driveway through swampland that is today the western edge of the Chestnut Hill Reservoir, and then rejoined today's city limit that runs essentially with the portion of Beacon Street that forms the western boundary of the Reservoir, and continues southeast to today's triple point between Boston, Brookline, and Newton near the intersection of Reservoir Road and Middlesex Road.

In 1874, the Lawrence farm land that is today the Boston College lower campus (bounded by Commonwealth Avenue, the slope dividing Boston College upper campus from lower campus, Beacon St., Chestnut Hill Driveway, and St. Thomas More Rd.) was ceded from Newton to Boston, so that Boston could add a western basin to the Chestnut Hill Reservoir. This area was excavated to become the Lawrence Basin of the Reservoir, paired with the surviving Bradlee Basin, to receive water from the Sudbury Aqueduct. Beacon St. was rerouted around the southern and western edges of the Bradlee Basin. The two halves of the Reservoir were separated to preserve the Cochituate Aqueduct, which ran under a causeway separating the two halves of the reservoir, now roughly St. Thomas More Rd. and Chestnut Hill Driveway, and a short stretch of Beacon Street.

While most of Chestnut Hill remained farmland well into the early 20th century, the area around the reservoir was developed in 1870 by landscape architect Frederick Law Olmsted, designer of Central Park in New York City and of the Emerald Necklace in Boston and Brookline.

Because of the significance of its landscape and architecture, the National Register of Historic Places designated parts of Chestnut Hill as historic districts in 1980s. Examples of Colonial, Italianate, Shingle, Tudor Revival, and Victorian architectural styles are evident in the village's country estates and mansions. The Boston College campus is itself an early example of Collegiate Gothic architecture.

== Parkland ==
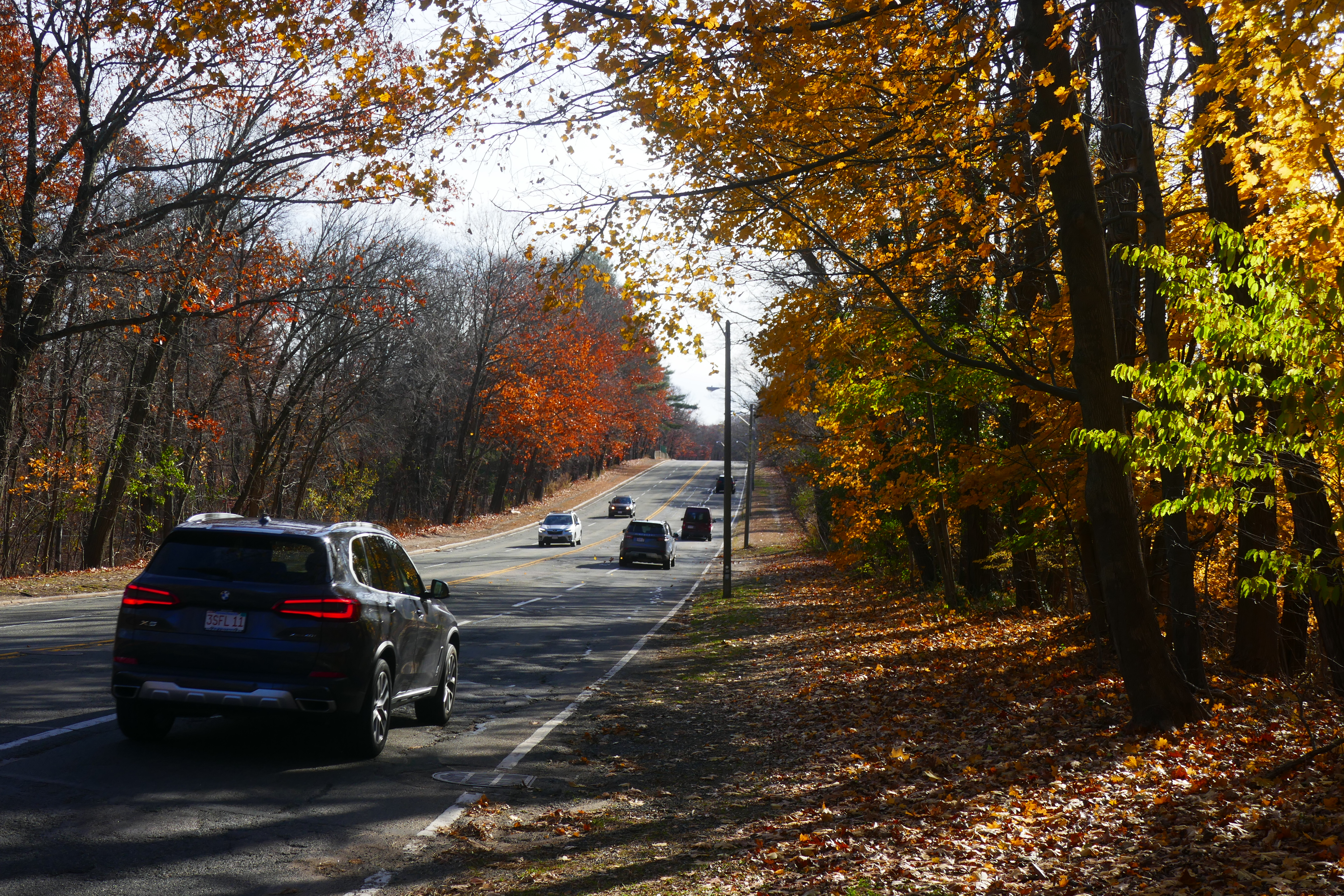
Cars on Hammond Pond Parkway, which divides the Hammond Pond Reservation in two

Hammond Pond Reservation, an extensive forest preserve and protected wetlands, goes through Chestnut Hill and Newton where it is also known as Webster Woods.

The Kennard Park and Conservation Area is a post-agricultural forest grown up on 19th century farmland. The mixed and conifer woodlands reveal colonial stone walls, a red maple swamp with century-old trees, and a sensitive fern marsh.

The Chestnut Hill Reservation embraces 120 acres adjacent to the Boston College campus, including a 1.5 mile walking trail around a reservoir. The Reservation was designed by Frederick Law Olmsted's son and constructed in the late 1860s to give Boston clean drinking water and a rural park. Just outside the park proper, the Boston Waterworks with its three gatehouses at water's edge and three majestic pump houses on Beacon Street is considered a masterpiece of 19th century engineering and landscape design.

The Heartbreak Hill Park, surrounding the Waban Hill reservoir, opened in 2015, and a major renovation was completed in 2020.

== Shopping centers ==
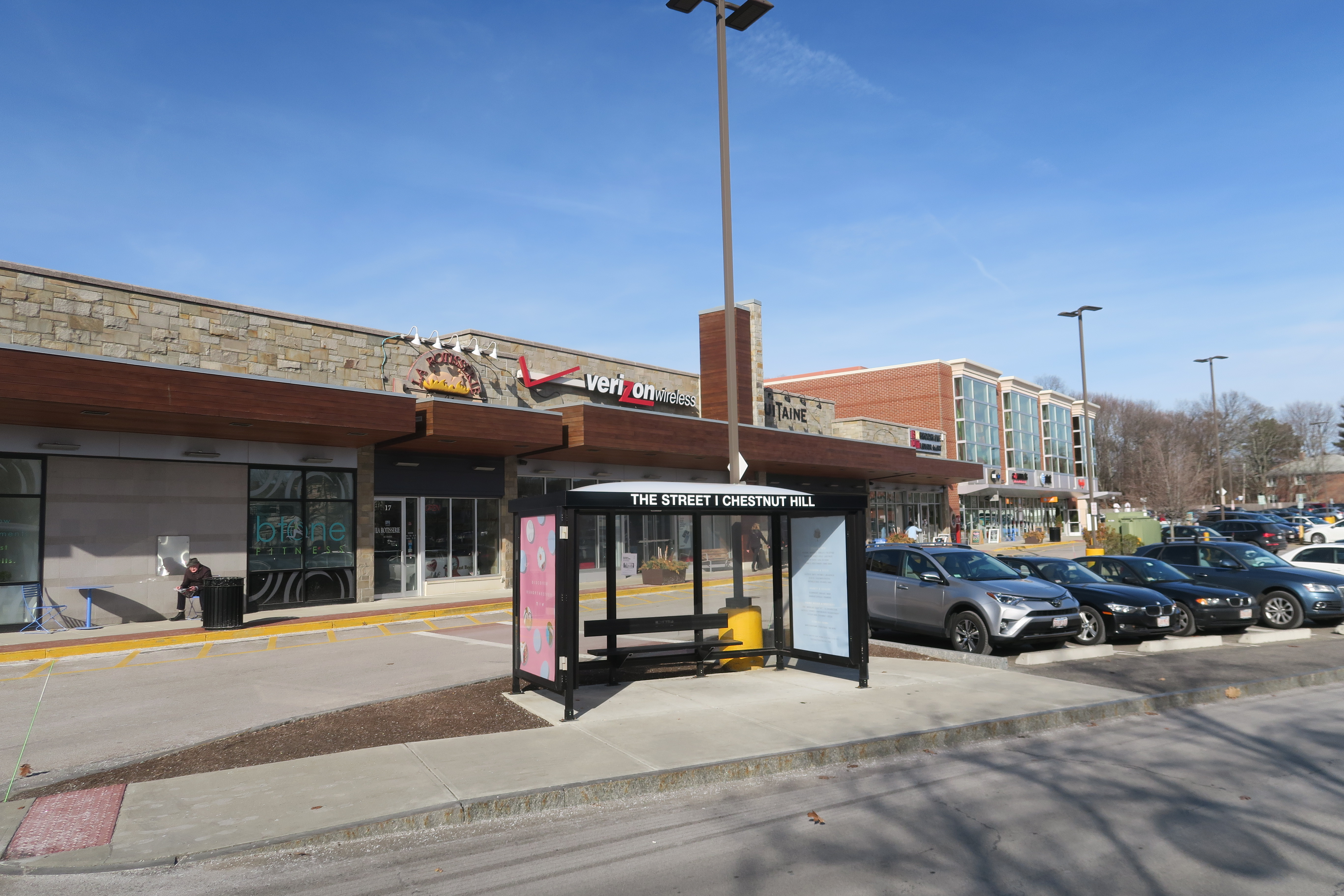
A bus stop within The Street parking lot

- The Shops at Chestnut Hill
- The Street Chestnut Hill

== Transportation ==
Chestnut Hill is served by two branches of the Green Line of the MBTA, Boston's light rail system. Stations include:

- B branch: Boston College; terminus of the line
- D branch: Chestnut Hill

The area is also served by the 51 and 60 MBTA buses.

Massachusetts Route 9 runs through the area from west to east and serves as the main retail corridor for Chestnut Hill and many surrounding communities. Hammond Pond Parkway connects the area from north to south as a four-lane road through conservation areas, bypassing the busy retail areas and residential neighborhoods.

== Registered historic districts ==
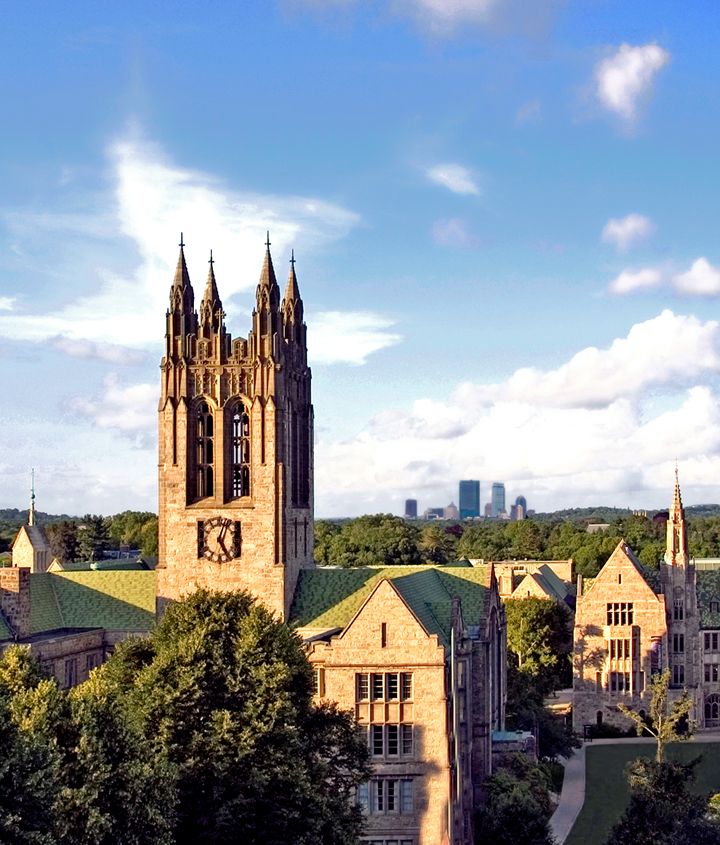
Boston College, with Boston's skyline seen in the background

- Boston College Main Campus Historic District – 140 Commonwealth Ave. (in Newton)
- Chestnut Hill Historic District – roughly bounded by Middlesex Rd., Reservoir Ln., Denny Rd., Boylston St. and Dunster Rd. (added November 17, 1985) (mostly in Brookline, but includes a few properties that spill into Newton)
- Chestnut Hill Reservoir Historic District – within Boston city limits
- Old Chestnut Hill Historic District – along Hammond St. and Chestnut Hill Rd. roughly bounded by Beacon St. and Essex Rd., and Suffolk Rd. (added October 4, 1986), within Newton city limits

== Education ==
The village is served by the Brookline Public Schools, Newton Public Schools, and Boston Public Schools, depending on the city or town in which a particular residence is located. The neighborhood also features several private schools including Brimmer and May School (non-denominational, K–12), The Chestnut Hill School, and Beaver Country Day School.

Chestnut Hill is home to both Boston College and Pine Manor College (formerly).

== Notable people ==
- Jane Alexander, actress. Brookline High School graduate.
- Larry Bird, NBA power forward, Boston Celtics 1979–1992, Chestnut Hill Resident 1979–1992
- Tom Brady, NFL quarterback
- Michael Dukakis, former governor of Massachusetts and 1988 Democratic nominee for President, Brookline High School graduate.
- Mary Baker Eddy, founder of The First Church of Christ, Scientist and The Christian Science Monitor newspaper, 1908–1910
- Theo Epstein, former general manager of the Chicago Cubs, former general manager of the Boston Red Sox, Brookline High School graduate.
- Reginald Fessenden, called "the father of broadcast radio", the Reginald A. Fessenden House in Chestnut Hill (Newton) is a US National Landmark as well as a US Historic Place.
- Paul Fireman, purchased American distribution rights to Reebok, Chairman of Fireman Capital Partners, Inc. Tabor Academy graduate.
- Terry Francona, former manager of the Boston Red Sox, current manager of the Cincinnati Reds
- John W. Henry, principal owner of the Boston Red Sox and Liverpool F.C.
- Jarome Iginla, former NHL player
- Kennedy Family, prominent national, Irish political family. Birthplace of John F. Kennedy, Theodore "Ted" "Edward" Kennedy, Robert Kennedy, Eunice Kennedy and other children
- Seth Klarman, Founder and CEO of the Baupost Group
- Karolyn Kirby, World Champion Women's beach volleyball, winner of the 1992 Summer Olympic beach volleyball tournament. Brookline High School graduate.
- Robert Kraft, owner of the New England Patriots, Brookline High School graduate.
- Philip Leder, cytogeneticist, died in Chestnut Hill
- Jeffrey Lurie, owner of the Philadelphia Eagles
- Conan O'Brien, TV host, "Conan (talk show)", Brookline High School graduate
- David Ortiz, Hall of Fame baseball player for the Boston Red Sox, 2002–2008
- Alice Hathaway Lee Roosevelt, the first wife of Theodore Roosevelt, and mother of Alice Roosevelt Longworth
- Leverett Saltonstall, Governor of Massachusetts (1939–1945) and United States Senator (1945–1967)
- Lew Schneider, Hollywood producer of Everybody Loves Raymond and American Dad! Brookline High School graduate
- Alan Rachins, TV actor, Dharma and Greg, L.A. Law. Brookline High School
- Thomas G. Stemberg, founder of Staples Inc.
- Alan Trefler, founder and CEO of Pegasystems
- Mike Wallace, TV host CBS, 60 Minutes, Brookline High School graduate
- John A. Wilson, sculptor

== See also ==
- List of Registered Historic Places in Brookline, Massachusetts
- List of Registered Historic Places in Newton, Massachusetts
- List of Registered Historic Places in Suffolk County, Massachusetts
