= House at 15 Davis Avenue =

Historic house in Massachusetts, United States

- U.S. National Register of Historic Places
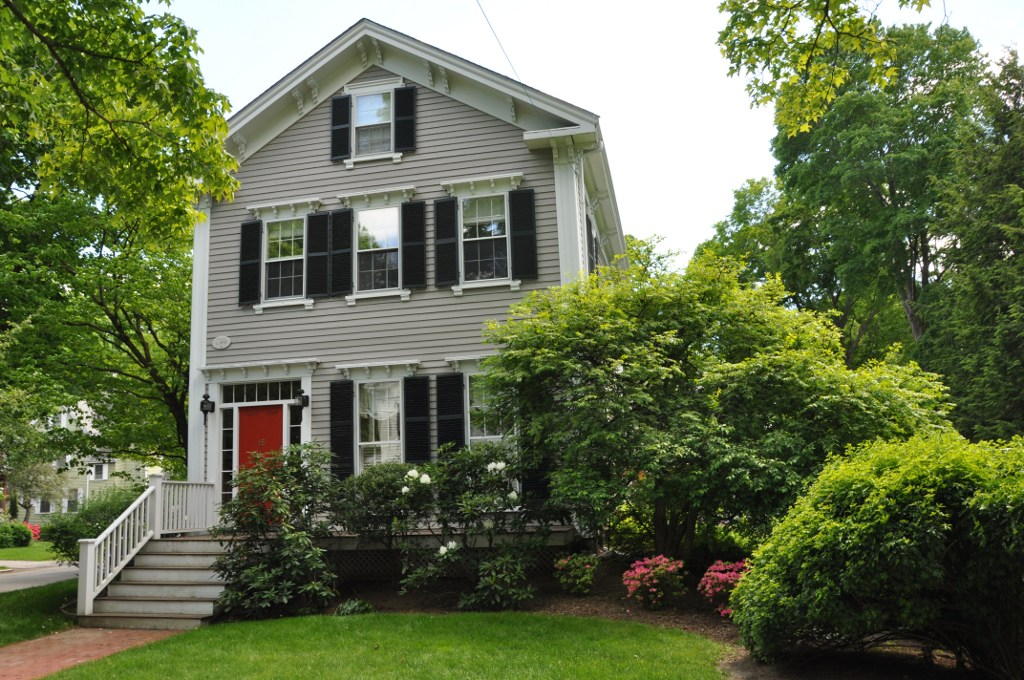

- Location within Massachusetts Location within the United States
- Location: 15 Davis Ave., Newton, Massachusetts
- Coordinates: 42°21′07.2″N 71°13′28.4″W
- Built: 1850
- Architectural style: Italianate
- MPS: Newton MRA
- NRHP reference No.: 86001817
- Added to NRHP: September 04, 1986

The House at 15 Davis Avenue in Newton, Massachusetts, is a well-preserved modest Italianate house.

== Description ==
It is a 2 1/2-story wood-frame structure, whose features include paired brackets in the eaves, bracketed lintels above the doors and windows, and paneled corner pilaster strips. The main entrance is flanked by sidelight windows and topped by a transom. Asphalt shingles were used as the roofing material, while wood and wooden clapboards were used for the walls and stones cuts for the foundation.

Likely built in the 1850s, this was probably one of the first houses built when Seth Davis (whose house stands on Eden Avenue) began to sell off some of his landholdings.

The house was listed on the National Register of Historic Places in 1986.

== See also ==
- House at 3 Davis Avenue
- National Register of Historic Places listings in Newton, Massachusetts
