= House at 3 Davis Avenue =

Historic house in Massachusetts, United States

- U.S. National Register of Historic Places
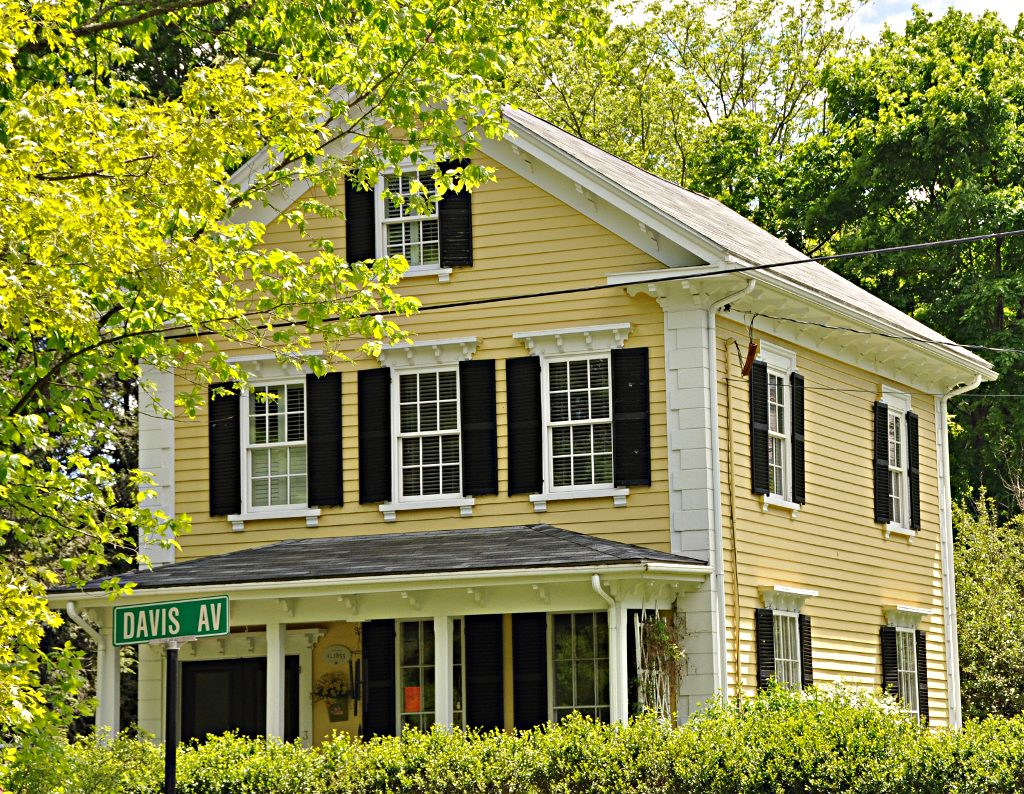

- Location within Massachusetts Location within the United States
- Location: 3 Davis Ave., Newton, Massachusetts
- Coordinates: 42°21′07.5″N 71°13′29.9″W
- Built: 1853
- Architectural style: Italianate
- MPS: Newton MRA
- NRHP reference No.: 86001826
- Added to NRHP: September 04, 1986

The House at 3 Davis Avenue in West Newton, Massachusetts, is a well-preserved modest Italianate residence. It is a 2 1/2-story wood-frame house, three bays wide, with a front-facing gable roof. It was built c. 1853, and has an unusual amount of decorative trim for a modest house. The eaves and gables are studded with brackets, and the corners have quoining blocks. The front parlor windows, sheltered by a porch also studded with brackets, are of extended length.

The house was listed on the National Register of Historic Places in 1986.

== See also ==
- House at 15 Davis Avenue
- National Register of Historic Places listings in Newton, Massachusetts
