= Hultman Aqueduct =

Aqueduct between Southborough and Weston, Massachusetts

Coordinates: 42.330°N 71.390°W

The Hultman Aqueduct forms part of the water supply system of eastern Massachusetts, managed by the Massachusetts Water Resources Authority (MWRA). The aqueduct extends from Southborough to Weston, connecting the Cosgrove Tunnel to the distribution network in the Greater Boston area. Opened in 1939, it replaced the Weston Aqueduct. It is now itself a secondary system, having been supplanted as the primary conduit in 2003 by the MetroWest Water Supply Tunnel. From 2009 to 2014, it was rehabilitated and taken offline to repair leaks which were causing losses of at least 400,000 US gallons (1,500,000 L) of water per day in the 1990s.

The aqueduct is a pressurized pipe system, consisting of 9,700 feet (3,000 m) of steel-reinforced pipe at its western end, 3 miles (4.8 km) of bored tunnel under the Sudbury Reservoir, and 13 miles (21 km) of steel-reinforced concrete pipe to the Norumbega Reservoir, which acts as a pressure regulation facility. Its western end is an intake, with semicircular diversion dam, on the open channel of the Wachusett Aqueduct in Southborough, near the later-constructed John J. Carroll Water Treatment Plant. Above-ground features of the aqueduct include the intake structure and diversion dam, a headhouse for a shaft at the Sudbury Reservoir (in what is now the Sudbury Dam Historic District), and the gatehouse and dams of the Norumbega Reservoir.
