= John J. Carroll Water Treatment Plant =

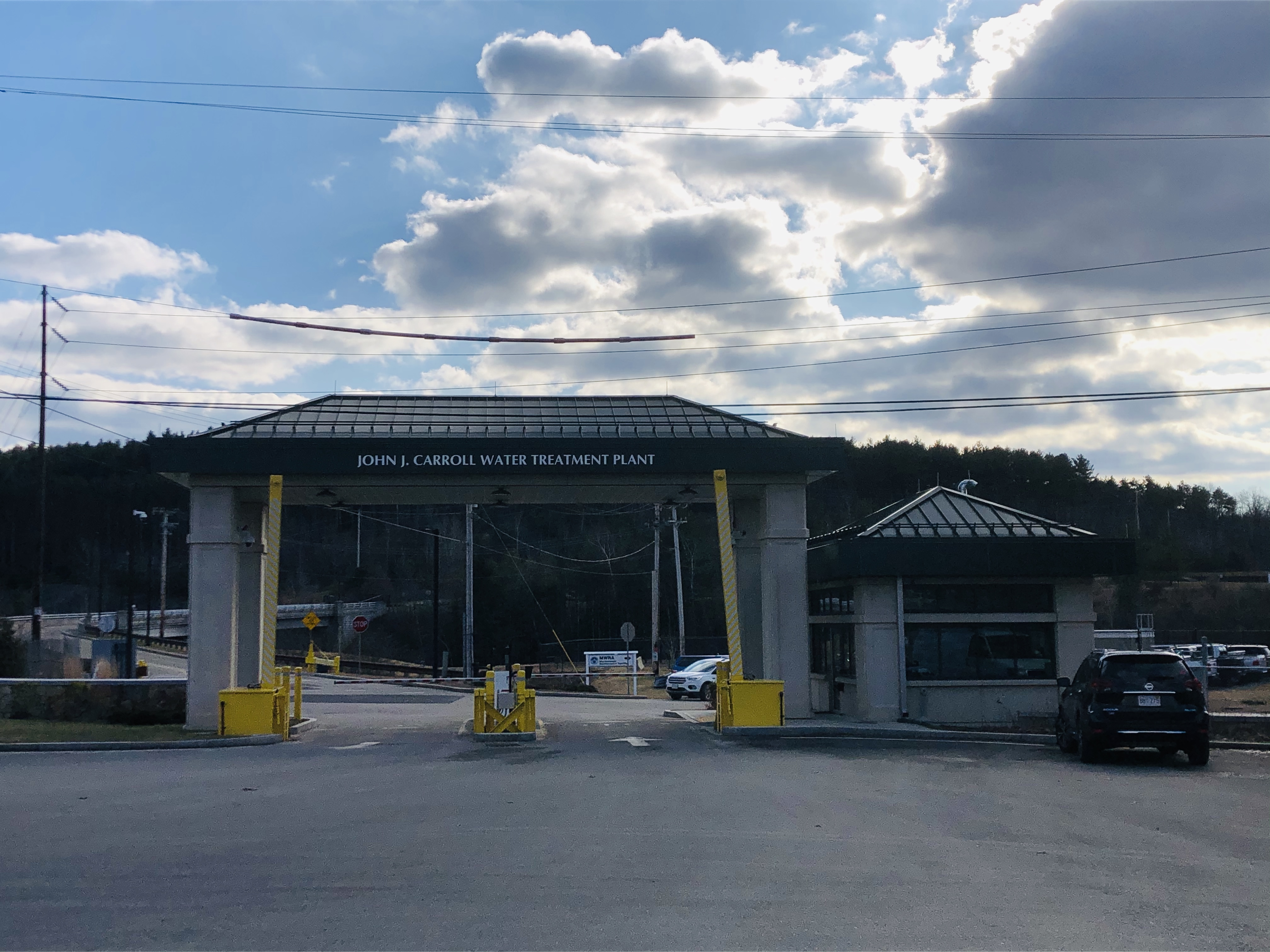
- Main entrance
- Interactive map of the John J. Carroll Water Treatment Plant area

General information
- Status: In operation
- Location: 84 D’Angelo Drive, Marlborough, Massachusetts, United States
- Coordinates: 42.313052°N 71.584402°W
- Construction started: March 1999
- Completed: March 2005
- Opened: July 27, 2005
- Cost: US$340 million
- Owner: Massachusetts Water Resources Authority

The John J. Carroll Water Treatment Plant (CWTP) is a water treatment plant operated since 2005 by the Massachusetts Water Resources Authority (MWRA) to treat water bound for Greater Boston. The plant is located at the town lines of Marlborough, Northborough, and Southborough, Massachusetts.

== History ==
CWTP is named after John J. Carroll, an original member of the Massachusetts Water Resources Authority (MWRA) board of directors. It was constructed from 1999 to 2005, and opened in July 2005. It replaced a prior facility only used for pH control. In addition to water treatment, CWTP has five concrete contact chambers capable of storing 11.3 million US gallons (43 million litres). Its construction budget was US$340 million.

== Operation ==
For water treatment, CWTP utilizes four ozone generators, designed to handle an average capacity of 275 million US gallons (1,040 million litres) per day—although average daily consumption is lower, at approximately 200 million US gallons (760 million litres)—and a peak level of 405 million US gallons (1,530 million litres) per day. Ultraviolet light treatment was added in April 2014. A 500 kW photovoltaic array is used to harness solar energy, reducing operational cost.

As of February 2019, water treatment performed at CWTP consists of:

Treatment	Purpose
Ozone	Cryptosporidium inactivation, Giardia inactivation
Sodium bisulfite	Ozone removal
Ultraviolet light	Water disinfectant
Sodium hypochlorite	Residual disinfection
Hydrofluorosilicic acid	Dental health
Aqueous ammonia	Residual disinfection
Sodium carbonate	Increase alkalinity for pH buffering
Carbon dioxide	Adjust pH level

Water for CWTP comes from the Wachusett Reservoir, primarily via the Cosgrove Tunnel, with the Wachusett Aqueduct as a standby backup. Treated water then flows towards Boston primarily via the MetroWest Water Supply Tunnel, with the Hultman Aqueduct as a secondary system. The Sudbury Aqueduct and Weston Aqueduct serve as emergency backups.
