= Weston Reservoir =

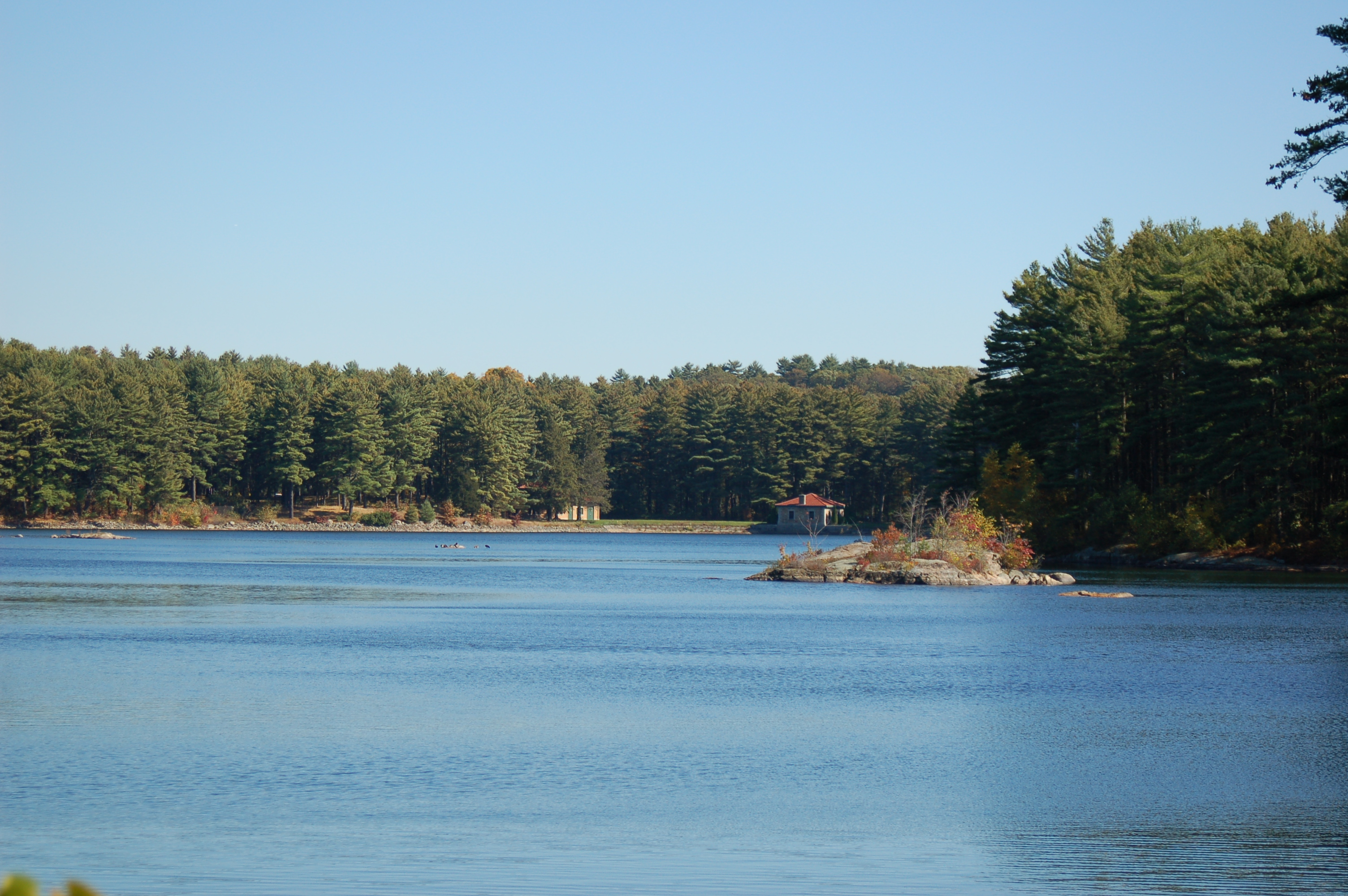

- Location within Massachusetts Location within the United States
- Location: Weston, Massachusetts, United States
- Coordinates: 42°20′53″N 71°17′31″W
- Type: Reservoir
- Primary inflows: 240 million US gallons per day (910 ML/d)
- Primary outflows: 240 million US gallons per day (910 ML/d)
- Catchment area: 60 acres (24 ha)
- Basin countries: United States
- Max. length: ≈2.2 mi (3.5 km)
- Max. width: ≈1.6 mi (2.6 km)
- Surface area: ≈3.5 sq mi (9.1 km^{2})
- Average depth: 58 ft (18 m)
- Max. depth: 110 ft (34 m)
- Water volume: 200×10^{6} US gal (0.76 hm^{3})
- Shore length^{1}: ≈4 mi (6.4 km)
- Surface elevation: 200 ft (61 m)
- Settlements: Weston
- ^{1} Shore length is not a well-defined measure.

The Weston Reservoir is part of the greater Boston water supply maintained by the Massachusetts Water Resources Authority. It is located in central Weston, with its principal public access point on Ash Street.

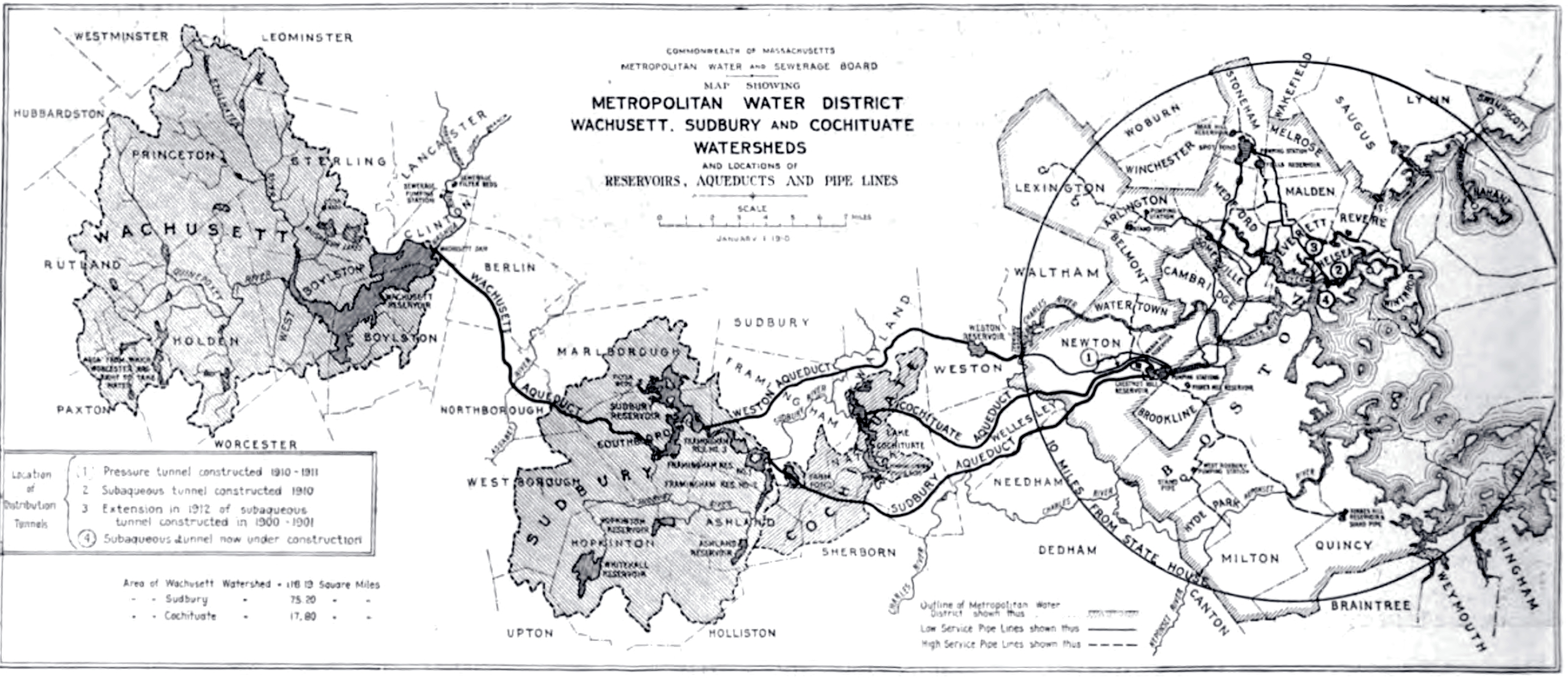
Metropolitan Water District map, 1910

Until the 1960s, the Weston Reservoir was one of two primary distribution reservoirs close to Boston, receiving water from the Sudbury Reservoir via the Weston Aqueduct (placed in service in December 1903). In the 1930s the system was extended to include water from the Quabbin Reservoir, delivered to the Sudbury Reservoir via the Wachusett Reservoir and Wachusett Aqueduct. This system has since the mid-20th century been upgraded to use completely underground facilities downstream of the Wachusett Reservoir. The Weston Reservoir remains a backup connection to two underground storage tanks near the Massachusetts Turnpike elsewhere in Weston.

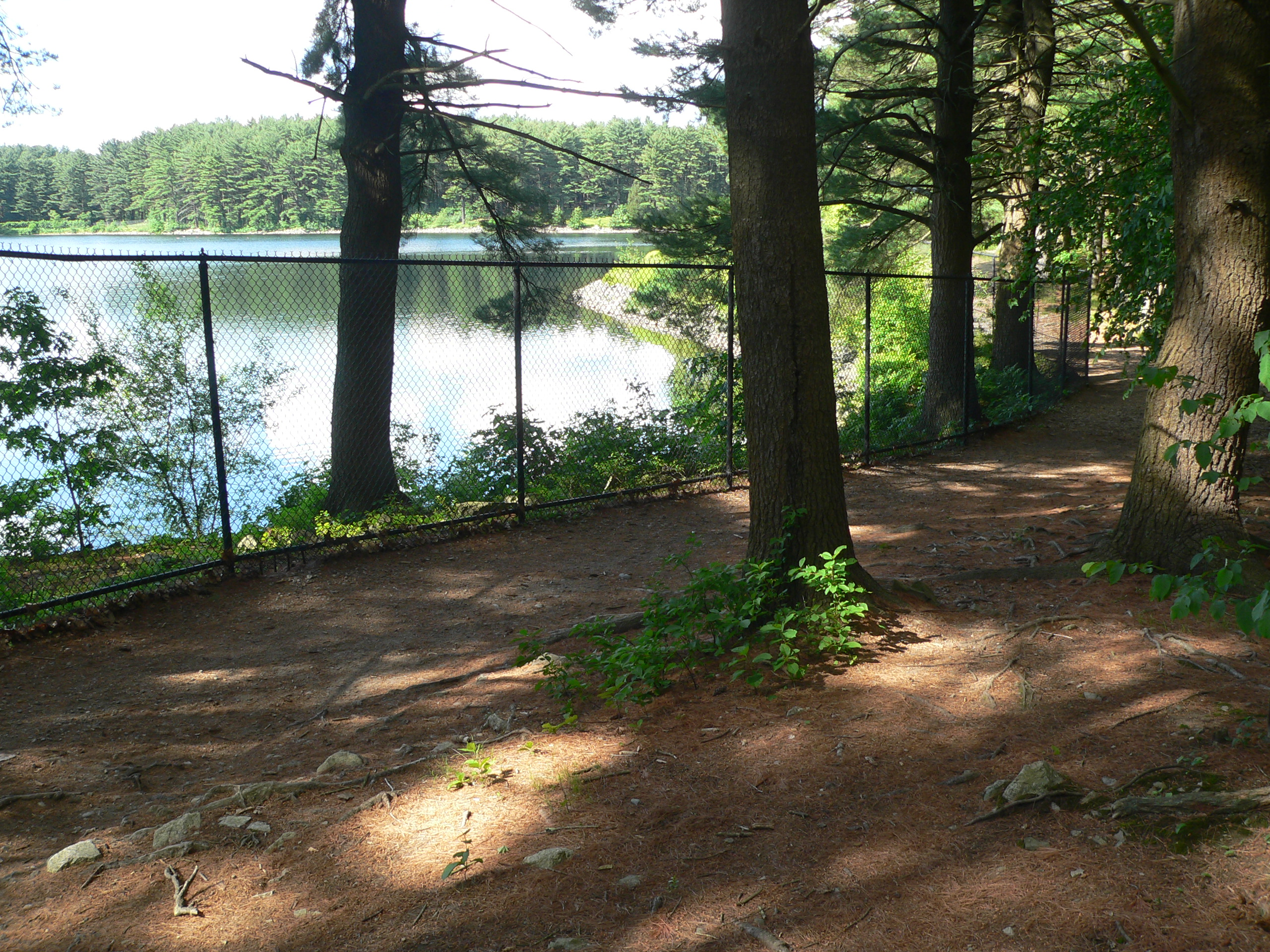
Path beside the reservoir

Walkers extensively use the area around the Weston Reservoir. This reservoir is maintained by the MWRA along with other open distribution reservoirs (Sudbury, Foss, Brackett, Stearns, Norumbega, Waban, Spot Pond, Chestnut Hill and Middlesex Fells) as a backup distribution system. The grounds of this reservoir are also used by the MWRA's Emergency Service Unit for training and storage of emergency trucks and equipment.
