= 2010 Boston water emergency =

Flood caused by a burst pipe in Massachusetts

The 2010 Boston water emergency occurred on May 1, 2010, when a water pipe in Weston, Massachusetts, broke and began flooding into the Charles River. This led to unsanitary water conditions in the greater Boston area, which resulted in Governor Deval Patrick declaring a state of emergency and an order for residents to boil drinking water. The leak was stopped on May 2. On May 4, the order was lifted. President Barack Obama signed an emergency disaster declaration offering federal help, authorizing the Department of Homeland Security and Federal Emergency Management Agency to coordinate disaster relief efforts with Massachusetts.

MWRA executive director Frederick Laskey called the break "catastrophic" and "everyone's worst nightmare in the water industry".

== Chronology ==
At about 10:00 am on May 1, a collar connecting two sections of 10-foot-wide (3.0 m) pipe ruptured in Weston, Massachusetts, disrupting the connection between the MetroWest Water Supply Tunnel and the City Tunnel.

With the water supply cut off, the emergency water supply reserve system from surrounding ponds was routed to the main water supply.

The rupture worsened as the afternoon progressed, eventually resulting in the loss of access to clean water from the Quabbin and Wachusett Reservoirs for approximately two million residents of 31 cities and towns, including Boston. At the height of the spill, approximately 8 million US gallons (30,000 m^{3}) of water entered the Charles River per hour. By evening, the Massachusetts Water Resources Authority had activated the backup water system, which was drawing water from the Chestnut Hill Reservoir, and Spot Pond Reservoir. The Sudbury Aqueduct supplied additional water to the Chestnut Hill reservoir from the Sudbury Reservoir and the Framingham #3 reservoir. Because water from these older surface reservoirs is not treated, the MWRA issued a boil order for the affected communities.

The Massachusetts Water Resources Authority (MWRA) issued an emergency water notice for the Boston area. Governor Deval Patrick issued a state of emergency and a boil-water advisory for Boston and a dozen surrounding communities, affecting nearly two million people.

Local agency officials used a variety of means to inform locals about the situation including location based SMS, Boston's reverse 911 citizen alert system, highway alert signs, driving through affected neighborhoods with bullhorns, and other emergency management systems. As a result of the water boil order, many residents rushed to purchase bottled water at local stores. Many stores quickly sold out of water, and bottled water companies increased shipments at the request of the Massachusetts Emergency Management Agency, maintaining availability at other stores.

Local stores quickly sold out their supplies of bottled water, and the Massachusetts National Guard was dispatched to deliver additional bottled water. The state government also asked bottled-water suppliers to increase their deliveries to the area. Many cafes such as Starbucks and Dunkin' Donuts that depended on municipal water for coffee production were closed or forced to operate with limited functionality.

By May 2, workers had stopped the spill and begun repairs on the pipe and MWRA officials reported steady water pressure on the night of May 2.

Experts and officials associated with the MWRA interviewed by reporters stated that the boil-water order was necessary because the backup reservoirs were untreated and unmonitored by bacterial cultures, which take a few days to run; similar situations had resulted in bacterial contamination bad enough to cause distressing gastrointestinal symptoms in otherwise healthy adults.

On May 4, 2010, at 3:00 am, Massachusetts Water Resources Authority announced that Governor Patrick had lifted the water-boil order for all but one of affected communities, Saugus. In a press conference later that morning, Patrick stated that tests had since cleared the water in Saugus as well.

The test results indicated that the bacteria levels in the emergency supply were not atypical for a normal day. If this had been known earlier, the boil-water order would have been unnecessary. No health effects for vulnerable classes, such as infants, pregnant women, and those with a compromised immune system, were reported in secondary sources during this event.

The engineering investigation following the incident found that the break was caused by failure of the coupling bolts. Inspection of recovered bolts and bolt fragments found that the bolts were poorly manufactured and sized incorrectly for the load.

== Affected communities ==
- Allston
- Arlington
- Belmont
- Boston
- Brighton
- Brookline
- Canton
- Chelsea
- Everett
- Hanscom Air Force Base
- Lexington
- Lynnfield W.D.
- Malden
- Marblehead
- Medford
- Melrose
- Milton
- Nahant
- Newton
- Norwood
- Quincy
- Reading
- Revere
- Saugus
- Somerville
- Stoneham
- Swampscott
- Waltham
- Wakefield
- Watertown
- Winchester
- Winthrop
