= Quincy Water Company Pumping Station =

- U.S. National Register of Historic Places
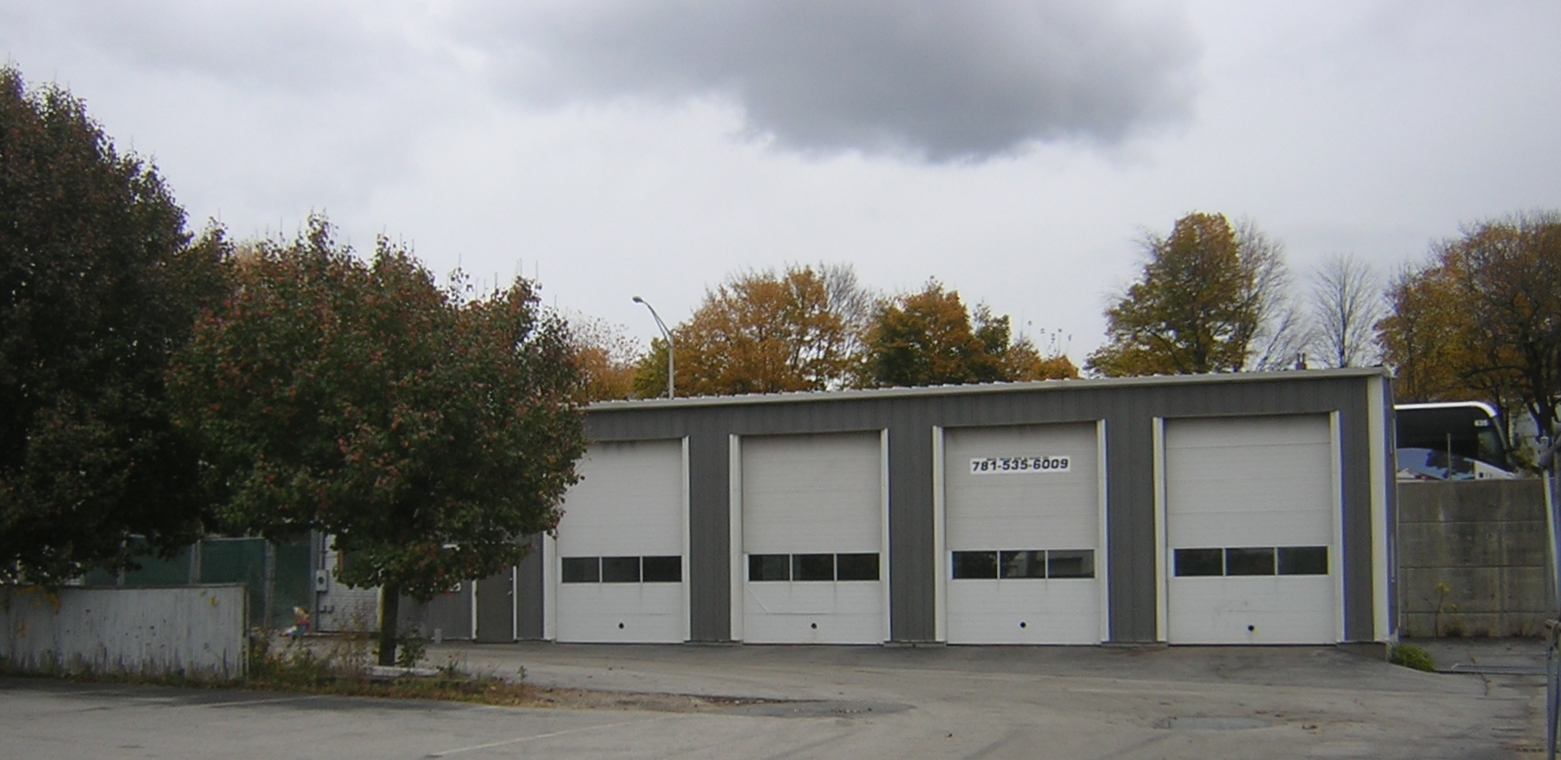
- Garage on the former site of the station

- Location within Massachusetts Location within the United States
- Location: 106 Penn St., Quincy, Massachusetts
- Coordinates: 42°14′8.8″N 71°0′26″W
- Area: 0.7 acres (0.28 ha)
- Built: 1883
- Architectural style: Italianate
- MPS: Quincy MRA
- NRHP reference No.: 89001361
- Added to NRHP: September 20, 1989

Quincy Water Company Pumping Station was a historic pumping station at 106 Penn Street in Quincy, Massachusetts. The two-story brick Italianate building was built in 1883 to meet the demand of Quincy's growing population for water. In addition to the pumping facilities, the building house offices and an apartment for the superintendent. Its use as a pumping station was discontinued in 1899 after Quincy joined with what is now called the MWRA.

The building was listed on the National Register of Historic Places in 1989, but has since been demolished.

== See also ==
- National Register of Historic Places listings in Quincy, Massachusetts
