= Weston Aqueduct =

- Weston Aqueduct Linear District
- U.S. National Register of Historic Places
- U.S. Historic district
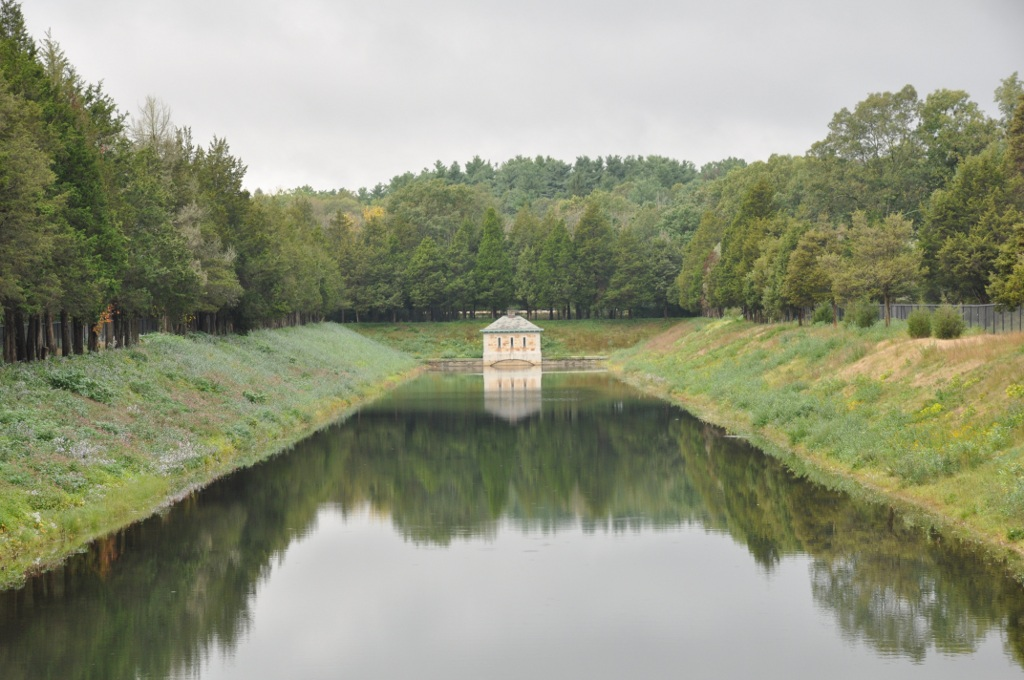
- The channel chamber house and open channel leading to the Weston Reservoir

- Location within Massachusetts Location within the United States
- Location: Southborough, Framingham, Wayland, and Weston
- Coordinates: 42°20′0″N 71°22′32″W
- Area: 300 acres (120 ha)
- Architect: Stearns, Frederick P.; et al.
- Architectural style: Renaissance
- MPS: Water Supply System of Metropolitan Boston MPS
- NRHP reference No.: 89002274
- Added to NRHP: January 18, 1990

The Weston Aqueduct is an aqueduct operated by the Massachusetts Water Resources Authority (MWRA). Now part of the MWRA backup systems, it was designed to deliver water from the Sudbury Reservoir in Framingham to the Weston Reservoir in Weston. The 13.5-mile (21.7 km) aqueduct begins at the Sudbury Dam, and passes through the towns of Southborough, Framingham, Wayland, and Weston. In 1990, the route, buildings and bridges of the aqueduct were added to the National Register of Historic Places as the Weston Aqueduct Linear District.

== History ==
The Weston Aqueduct was built early in the 20th century during the third phase of the evolution of the Greater Boston water supply system, now administered by the Massachusetts Water Resources Authority (MWRA). During this phase, the other major elements of the water supply included the Sudbury Dam and Reservoir, and the Wachusett Aqueduct and Reservoir. The purpose of the aqueduct and Weston Reservoir were to channel water to the suburbs north of Boston via Spot Pond in Stoneham. The aqueduct was built between 1901 and 1903, under the supervision of Frederic P. Stearns, the chief engineer of the MWRA predecessor, the Metropolitan Water Board. The buildings that shelter the aqueduct's above-ground elements were designed by Shepley, Rutan and Coolidge. The landscaping of the aqueduct's open channel was (along with other elements of the Weston Reservoir) designed by the Olmsted Brothers.

The functions of the Weston Aqueduct and Reservoir have been taken over by the Hultman Aqueduct, built in 1941, and the MetroWest Water Supply Tunnel, completed in 2003. They continue to be held by the MWRA as emergency-use facilities along with the Chestnut Hill Reservoir and Sudbury Aqueduct.

== Description ==
The aqueduct is a water channel that runs mostly underground, through a structure that is about 13 feet (4.0 m) high and 12 feet (3.7 m) wide. The cross section is roughly horseshoe-shaped, with a concrete base, side walls lined in brick, and an unlined concrete arch. There are two chambers where water flow through the aqueduct is metered: both are located in Framingham, and consist of a concrete substructure, on top of which stands a small building housing equipment. These are 14 feet (4.3 m) square, made of ashlar granite, with predominantly orange coloring, and pink-gray quoins.

There are two siphon sections where the aqueduct cross low spots in the terrain. The western of these crosses the Sudbury River, and consists of a steel pipe 3,605 feet (1,099 m) in length that is built over the river as an arch mounted on stone abutments; the eastern one crosses Happy Hollow and under Massachusetts Route 126, and is 1,100 feet (340 m) long. At each end of the siphons stands a control house that is 21 feet (6.4 m) square, styled similarly to the metering chambers. At the Weston end of the aqueduct is a channel chamber, a 17-by-24-foot (5.2 m × 7.3 m) hip-roofed structure from which the flow into the open channel can be regulated. The open channel is 1,500 feet (460 m) feet long and about 20 feet (6.1 m) wide, and is lined with riprap. The open channel is spanned by the Ash Street Bridge, a concrete arch bridge faced in stone. The Weston Reservoir was carefully designed by the Olmsted Brothers to appear natural; the final element of the aqueduct is the terminal chamber near the reservoir outlet, from which distribution pipes channel the water onward. The building housing the terminal chamber is larger and more elaborate than the other structures, but is similarly styled.

== See also ==
- National Register of Historic Places listings in Weston, Massachusetts
- National Register of Historic Places listings in Framingham, Massachusetts
- National Register of Historic Places listings in Middlesex County, Massachusetts
- National Register of Historic Places listings in Worcester County, Massachusetts
