= Chicopee Valley Aqueduct =

Bridge in Massachusetts, United States

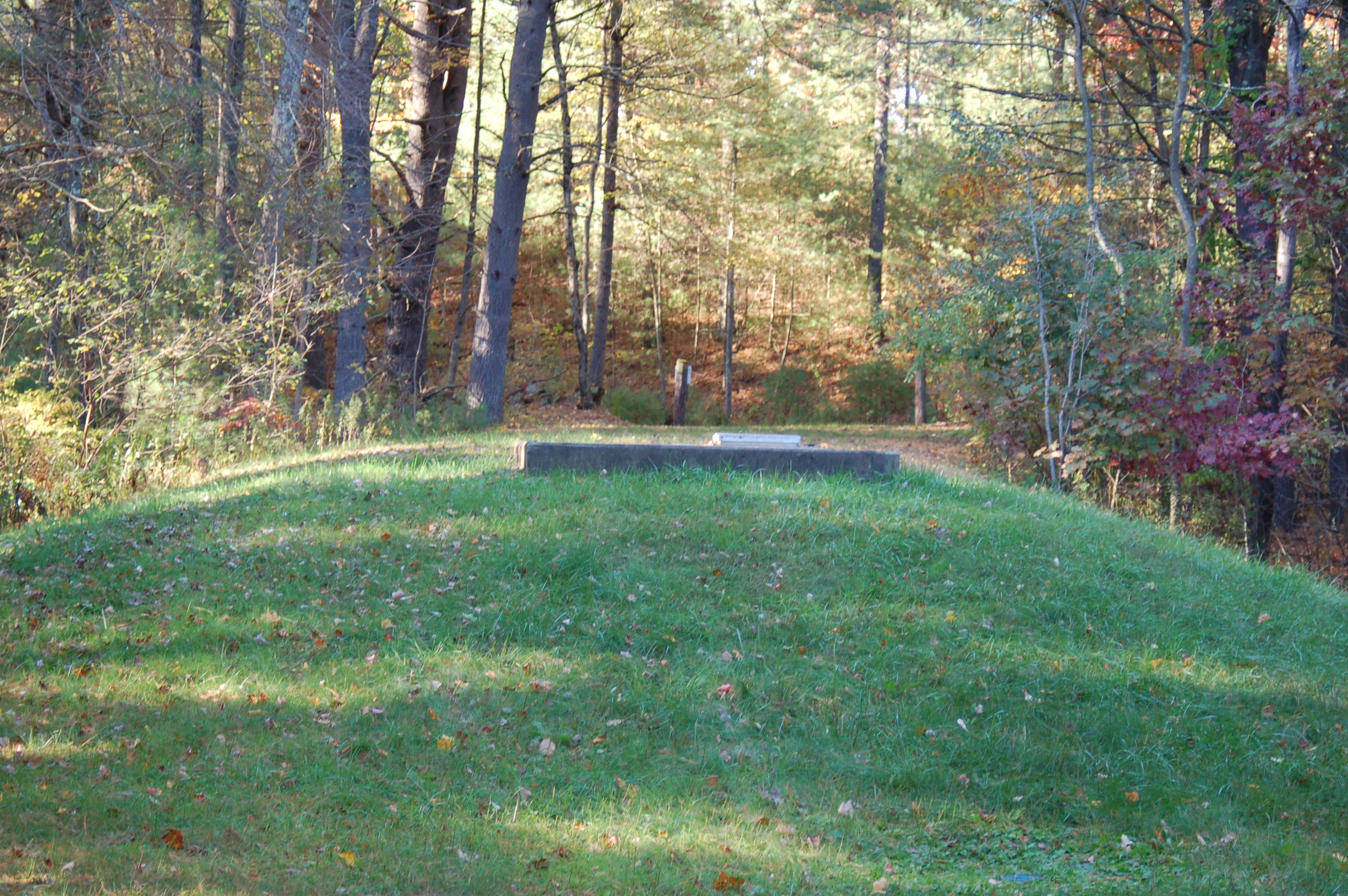
- Chicopee Valley Aqueduct access shaft
- Coordinates: 42°16′59″N 72°20′36″W
- Begins: Quabbin Reservoir
- Ends: Chicopee
- Official name: Chicopee Valley Aqueduct
- Maintained by: MWRA

Characteristics
- Total length: 13.1 mi (21.08 km)
- First section length: 4.5 mi (7.24 km)
- First section diameter: 48 in (121.92 cm)
- Second section length: 8.6 mi (13.84 km)
- Second section diameter: 36 in (91.44 cm)
- Capacity: 20 cu ft/s (0.566 m^{3}/s)

History
- Construction start: 1947
- Opened: 1950

The Chicopee Valley Aqueduct carries water from the Quabbin Reservoir in the U.S. state of Massachusetts to the Chicopee city line. It delivers Quabbin water to Wilbraham, South Hadley fire district #1, and Chicopee. It is part of the Chicopee River Watershed.

== History ==
In 1947, the Massachusetts Legislature authorized the construction of the aqueduct, which was completed three years later.

== Present day ==
The Massachusetts Water Resources Authority initiated the Chicopee Valley Aqueduct Pipeline Redundancy project to provide redundancy and to improve reliability to the Chicopee Valley Aqueduct water transmission system to the three already served communities. The design phase was completed in 2001. Construction of a redundant barrel was substantially completed in 2008.
