= Boston Water and Sewer Commission =

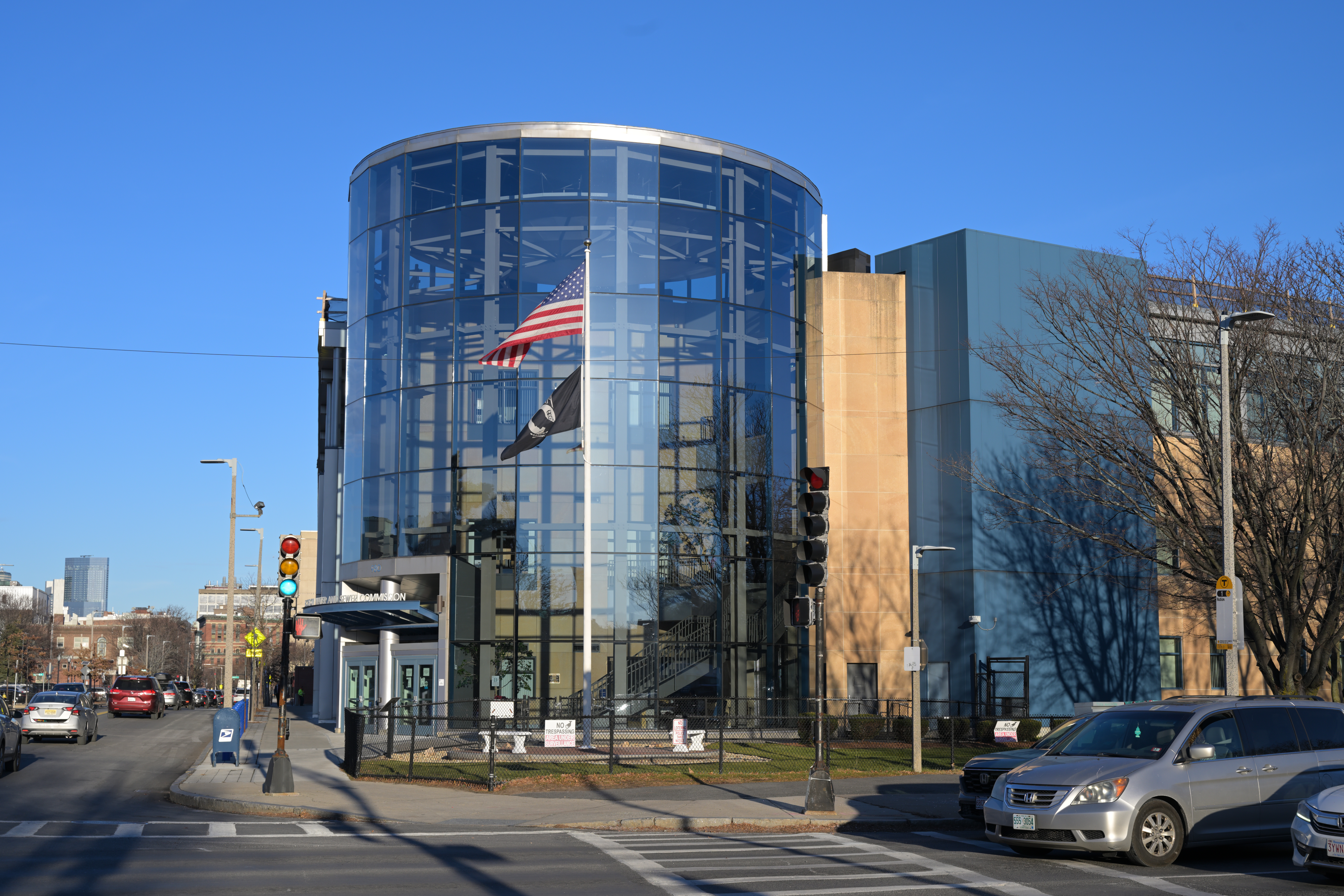
- Headquarters in Roxbury, Boston

Agency overview
- Formed: 1977
- Website: bwsc.org

The Boston Water and Sewer Commission (BWSC) serves retail customers with water services in Boston, Massachusetts. It purchases water wholesale from the Massachusetts Water Resources Authority (MWRA).

The largest retail water and wastewater utility in New England, BWSC owns and operates the drinking water distribution, wastewater collection and stormwater drainage systems; which utilise 1,015 miles (1,633 km) of water main and 1,435 miles (2,309 km) of sewer pipe and storm drain. It was created in 1977 taking control of the city operated sewer system and the state operated treatment facilities.

== History ==
The basic Boston water distribution system opened in 1848, and the wastewater collection system in 1883. In a response to the dangers posed to Boston by severely deteriorated water distribution and wastewater collection systems, BWSC was created in 1977 by an act of the Massachusetts legislature as a public instrument, a corporate separate and apart from the City of Boston. The Enabling Act empowered the BWSC to independently set rates and charges for the water distribution and wastewater collection services it provides and entrusted BWSC to improve and maintain the integrity of its systems.

== Services and infrastructure ==
BWSC purchases water from the Massachusetts Water Resources Authority (MWRA), a wholesale supplier of water and wastewater services. MWRA collect water in the Quabbin Reservoir, connected by a 65 miles (105 km) tunnel to Boston, and enters BWSC distribution system at 27 metered sites. When full, the Quabbin Reservoir holds 412 billion US gallons (1.56×10^{9} m^{3}), making it one of the largest man-made public water supplies in the country.

In the 40 years since its creation, BWSC has relaid or relined over 300 miles (480 km) of aging pipe, and claims to have reduced the amount of water being lost through system leaks by 50 million US gallons (190,000 m^{3}) per day. It has also, in conjunction with the MWRA, eliminated 81 miles (130 km) of combined sewer overflows to Boston Harbor. In 2003, BWSC installed an automated reading device on every meter, that allows it to track daily consumption.

The BWSC is home to the largest solar array in the City of Boston. In June 2007, the City of Boston became one of thirteen inaugural Solar America Cities under the Solar American Initiative led by the U.S. Department of Energy and launched Solar Boston, a half-million-dollar program to encourage the widespread adoption of solar energy in Boston. Through Solar Boston, the City will:

(a) Develop a strategy for the installation of solar technology throughout Boston including mapping feasible locations, preparing a project-labor agreement, and planning the citywide bulk purchase, financing, and installation of solar technology, (b) Work with local organizations to maximize Boston 's participation in state incentive programs and innovative financing initiatives (c) Create a successor non-profit organization to implement the long-term goals of the partnership, (d) Solar Boston partners include the U.S. Department of Energy, the Massachusetts Technology Collaborative, local utilities and unions, an anonymous foundation, and a broad range of local, regional, and national clean energy stakeholders including the US Department of Energy.

== 2015 Water and sewer rates ==
Consumption (Cu ft/day)	Water rate Per 1000 Cubic feet	Water Rate Per 1000	Sewer rate Per 1000 Cubic feet	Sewer Rate Per 1000
First 19	49.00	6.550	63.43	8.480
Next 20	51.29	6.856	65.38	8.741
Next 50	53.41	7.140	66.70	8.917
Next 260	56.79	7.592	70.37	9.408
Next 950	59.25	7.921	74.26	9.928
Over 1,299	61.33	8.199	76.82	10.270

Table of rates effective January 1, 2015

The typical customer pays just over a penny per gallon: 'The average one family customer using 180 US gallons (680 L) per day ("GPD”) in 2015 will be charged $84.30 per 31-day month or $992.56 annually. A multi-unit residence using 600 GPD will be charged $291.20 per 31-day month or approximately $3,428.64 annually. A small commercial property using 4,000 GPD will be charged $2,119.45 per 31-day month or approximately $24,954.81 annually.'
