= Boil-water advisory =

Drinking water safety directive

A boil-water advisory (BWA), boil-water notice, boil-water warning, boil-water order, boil ban, or boil order is a public-health advisory or directive issued by governmental or other health authorities to consumers when a community's drinking water is or could be contaminated by pathogens.

Under a BWA, the Centers for Disease Control and Prevention recommends that water be brought to a rolling boil for one minute before it is consumed in order to kill protozoa, bacteria, and viruses. At altitudes above 2,000 metres (6,600 ft), boiling should be extended to 3 minutes, as the lower boiling point at high altitudes requires more time to kill such organisms. A boil water advisory usually lasts up to 24-48 hours, but sometimes more.

BWA's are typically issued when monitoring of water being served to consumers detects E. coli or other microbiological indicators of sewage contamination. Another reason for a BWA is a failure of distribution system integrity evidenced by a loss of system pressure. While loss of pressure does not necessarily mean the water has been contaminated, it does mean that pathogens may be able to enter the piped-water system and thus be carried to consumers. In the United States, this has been defined as a drop below 20 pounds per square inch (140 kPa).

== History ==
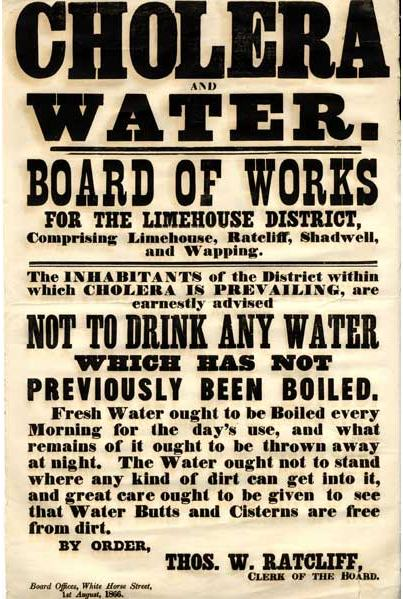
First known science-based boil-water advisory (1866)

John Snow's 1849 recommendation that water be "filtered and boiled before it is used" is one of the first practical applications of the germ theory of disease in the area of public health and is the antecedent to the modern boil water advisory. Snow demonstrated a clear understanding of germ theory in his writings. He first published his theory in an 1849 essay On the Mode of Communication of Cholera, in which he correctly suggested that the fecal-oral route was the mode of communication, and that the disease replicated itself in the lower intestines. Snow later went so far as to accurately propose in his 1855 edition of the work that the structure of cholera was that of a cell. Snow's ideas were not fully accepted until years after his death in 1858.

The first known modern boil-water advisory based solely on germ theory and unfettered by extraneous and irrelevant advice was distributed in 1866 during the last of three major cholera outbreaks that ravaged London in the 19th century.

== Notable instances ==
A boil-water advisory occurred in Asheville, North Carolina as a result of Hurricane Helene. This was put in place on October 15, 2024. It was issued due to "loss of pressure in distribution system pipes and levels of particles in the water". Asheville Water Services Recovery announced the boil-water advisory would be in effect until October 19, 2024 as the water quality did not adhere to that defined by the Safe Drinking Water Act.

== See also ==
- 2010 Boston water emergency
- 1998 Sydney water crisis
- Walkerton E. coli outbreak
- Water supply
- Water pollution
