= Wachusett Reservoir =

Second largest body of water in the state of Massachusetts

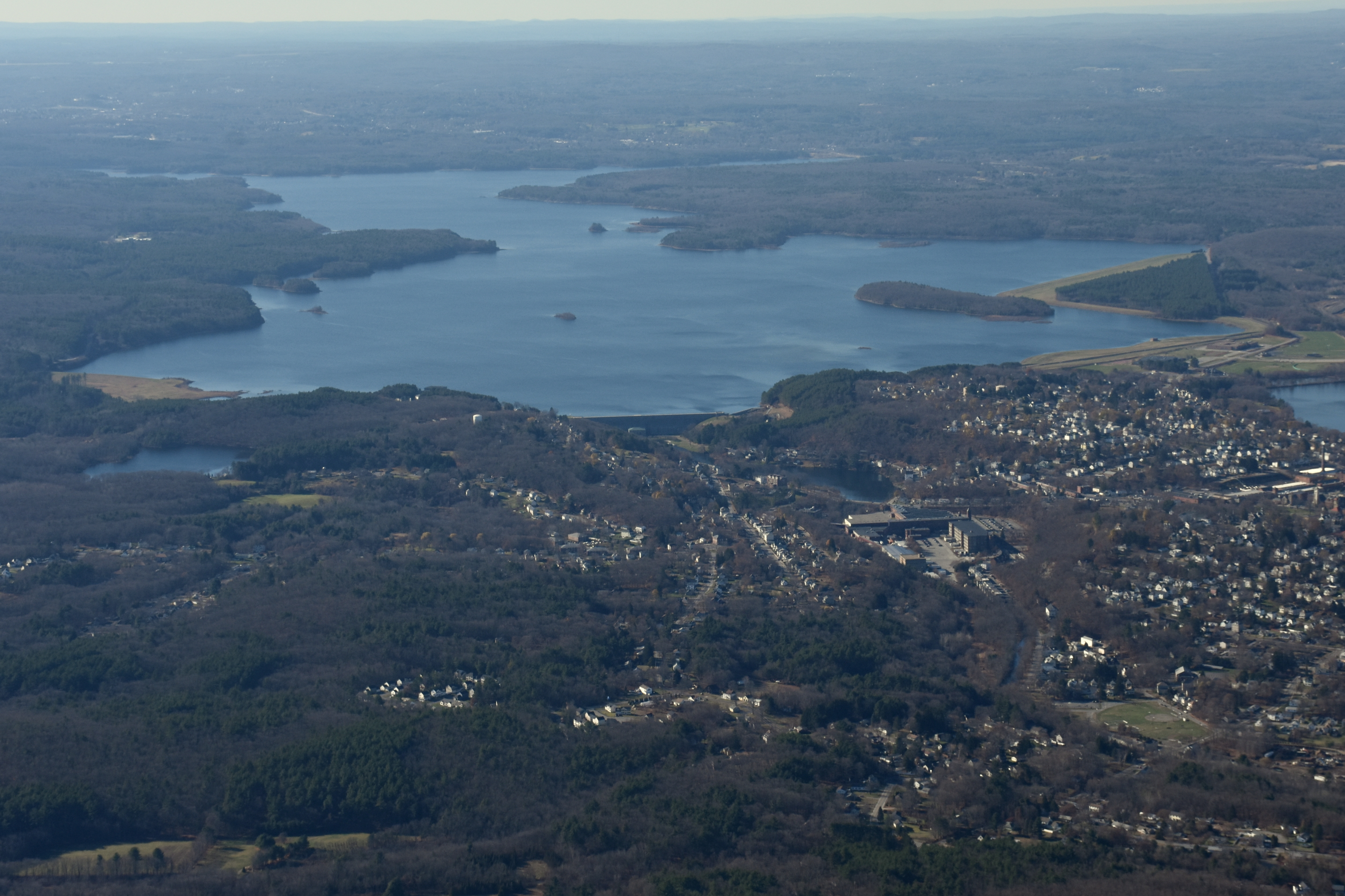
- Wachusett Reservoir and Dam from above Clinton, Massachusetts

- Location within Massachusetts Location within the United States
- Location: Worcester County, Massachusetts, United States
- Coordinates: 42°22′10″N 71°44′18″W
- Type: Reservoir
- Primary inflows: Quinapoxet River, Stillwater River, Quabbin Aqueduct
- Primary outflows: Wachusett Aqueduct, Cosgrove Tunnel, South Nashua River
- Catchment area: 108 mi^{2} (280 km^{2})
- Basin countries: United States
- Max. length: 7 mi (11 km)
- Max. width: 1.1 mi (1.8 km)
- Surface area: 7 mi^{2} (18 km^{2})
- Average depth: 48 ft (15 m)
- Max. depth: 120 ft (37 m)
- Water volume: 65,000,000,000 US gal (0.25 km^{3})
- Shore length^{1}: 21 mi (34 km)
- Surface elevation: 384 ft (117 m)
- Settlements: Clinton, West Boylston, Boylston, Sterling
- ^{1} Shore length is not a well-defined measure.

The Wachusett Reservoir is the second largest body of water in the state of Massachusetts. It is located in central Massachusetts, northeast of Worcester. It is part of the water supply system for metropolitan Boston maintained by the Massachusetts Water Resources Authority (MWRA). It has an aggregate capacity of 65 billion US gallons (250,000,000 m^{3}) and an area of almost 7 square miles (18 km^{2}). Water from the reservoir flows to the covered Norumbega Storage Facility via the Cosgrove Tunnel and the MetroWest Water Supply Tunnel. The reservoir has a maximum depth of 120 feet (37 m) and a mean depth of 48 feet (15 m).

The reservoir serves as both an intermediate storage reservoir for water from the Quabbin Reservoir, and a water source itself, fed by its own watershed. The reservoir is fed by the Quinapoxet and Stillwater rivers, along with the Quabbin Aqueduct, which carries water from the Quabbin Reservoir. It is part of the Nashua River watershed, forming the headwaters of the river. Because it is an intermediate storage reservoir, its water levels are kept relatively constant while the Quabbin Reservoir fluctuates based on precipitation and demand. At times when the Wachusett Reservoir becomes high due to its own watershed producing a large amount of runoff such as during snow melting, the flow from the Quabbin is shut off and water from the Ware River flows backwards down the Quabbin Aqueduct into the Quabbin Reservoir for storage.

== History ==
In 1897, the Nashua River above the town of Clinton was impounded by the Wachusett Dam; 4,380 acres (17.7 km^{2}) were flooded in the towns of Boylston, West Boylston, Clinton, and Sterling. Work was completed in 1905 and the reservoir first filled in May 1908 (118 years ago). Its water was originally delivered to the Sudbury Reservoir via the Wachusett Aqueduct, with the Cosgrove Tunnel (completed in 1965) providing redundancy. Interconnections at the Sudbury Reservoir eventually delivered the water to the Weston Reservoir via the Weston Aqueduct; these downstream facilities were relegated to backup roles in the late 20th and early 21st century by the construction of the MetroWest Water Supply Tunnel and covered storage facilities.

West Boylston's prominent landmark—the Old Stone Church—was left remaining as a reminder of those who lost their homes and jobs to the building of the reservoir. It is one of the most photographed sites in the area.

When it was built, the Wachusett Reservoir was the largest public water supply reservoir in the world and the largest body of water in Massachusetts. It has since been surpassed by the Quabbin Reservoir (see that article for a history of reservoir building in Massachusetts).

== Recreation and fishing ==
Because the reservoir is the water supply for Boston, not all areas around it are open to the public. Regulations designed to ensure pure water include the prohibition of boats, ice fishing, wading, swimming, overnight camping, alcoholic beverages, littering, animals, bikes, and motor vehicles from the reservoir and abutting property. These regulations are controversial to recreation and fishing proponents, who argue the rules are not needed to protect water quality. A network of fire roads provides easy access for hikers and cross-country skiers.

In 1999, the reservoir contained twelve native and twelve introduced species of fish. The limited access, combined with abundant, high-quality habitat, produced state records for brown trout, land-locked salmon, smallmouth bass, and white perch. The Wachusett Reservoir is one of only two locations in Massachusetts to support lake trout, a North American native trout species which has been known to reach 20 plus pounds in the reservoir. In addition stocked rainbow trout are known to "holdover" (live through multiple summers) in Wachusett. Rainbow smelt are also present although their numbers are greatly reduced when compared to many years ago. Lake trout are a major draw to fishermen.

Approximately 80% of the 37-mile (60 km) shoreline is usually open to angling from April 1 through November 30, depending on ice conditions.

== Image gallery ==
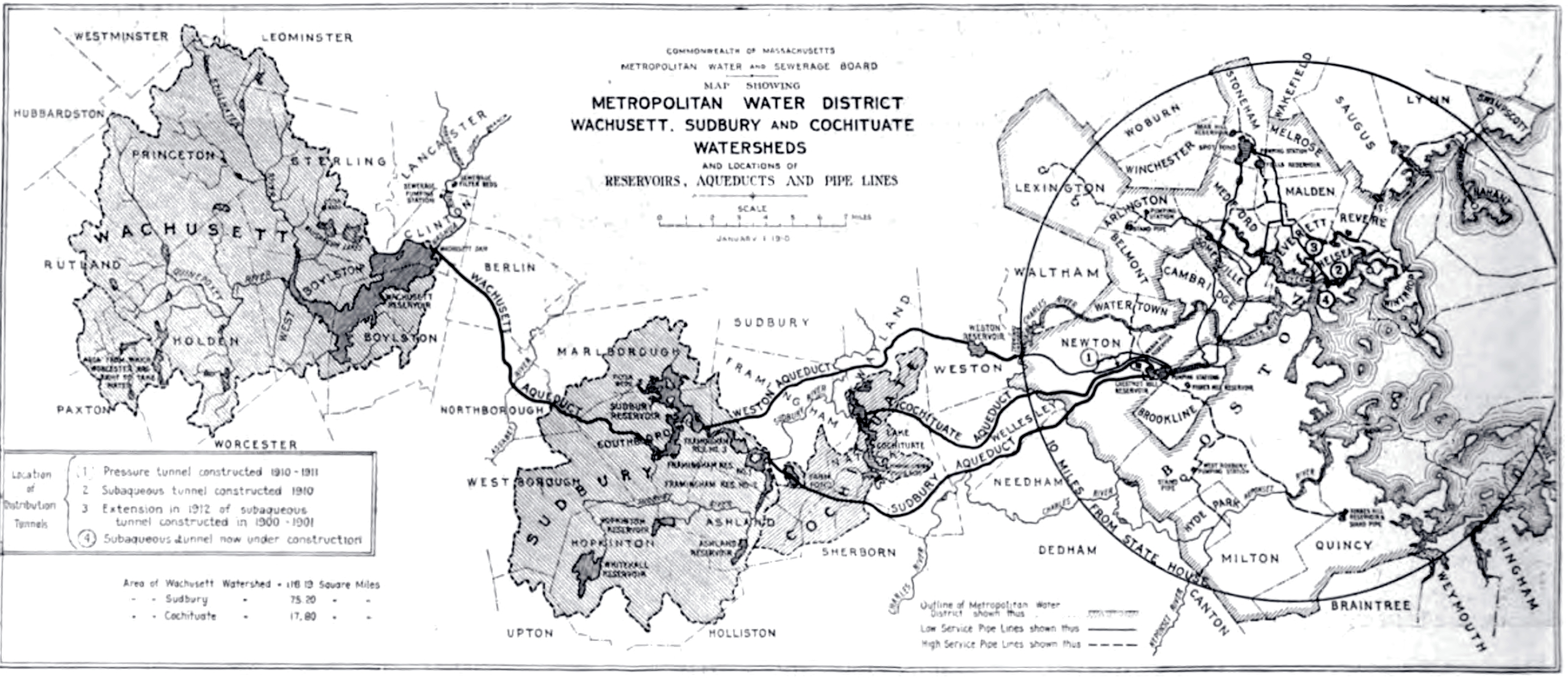
Metropolitan Water District map, 1910

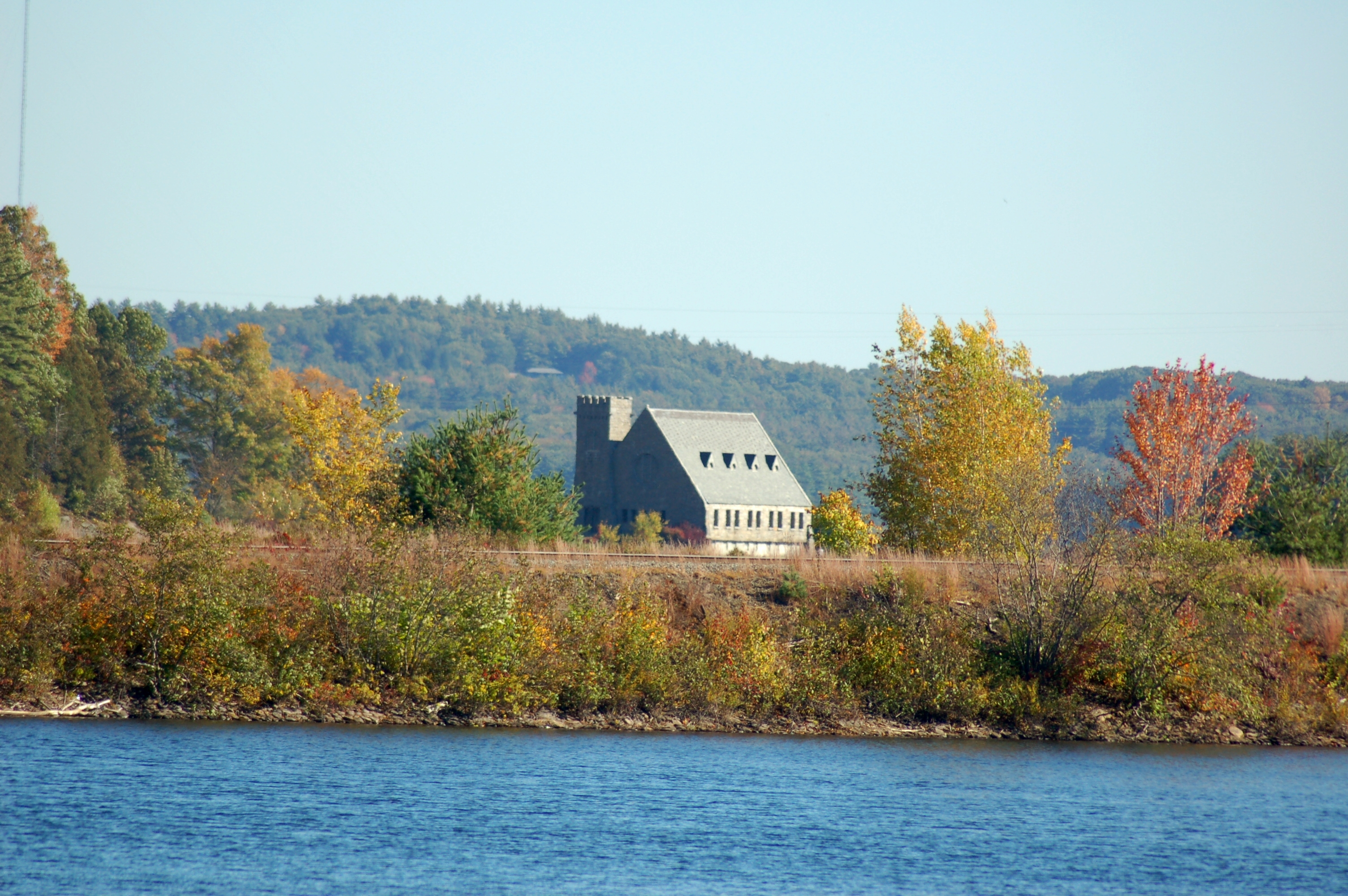
Old Stone Church on the reservoir, viewed from the Stillwater River

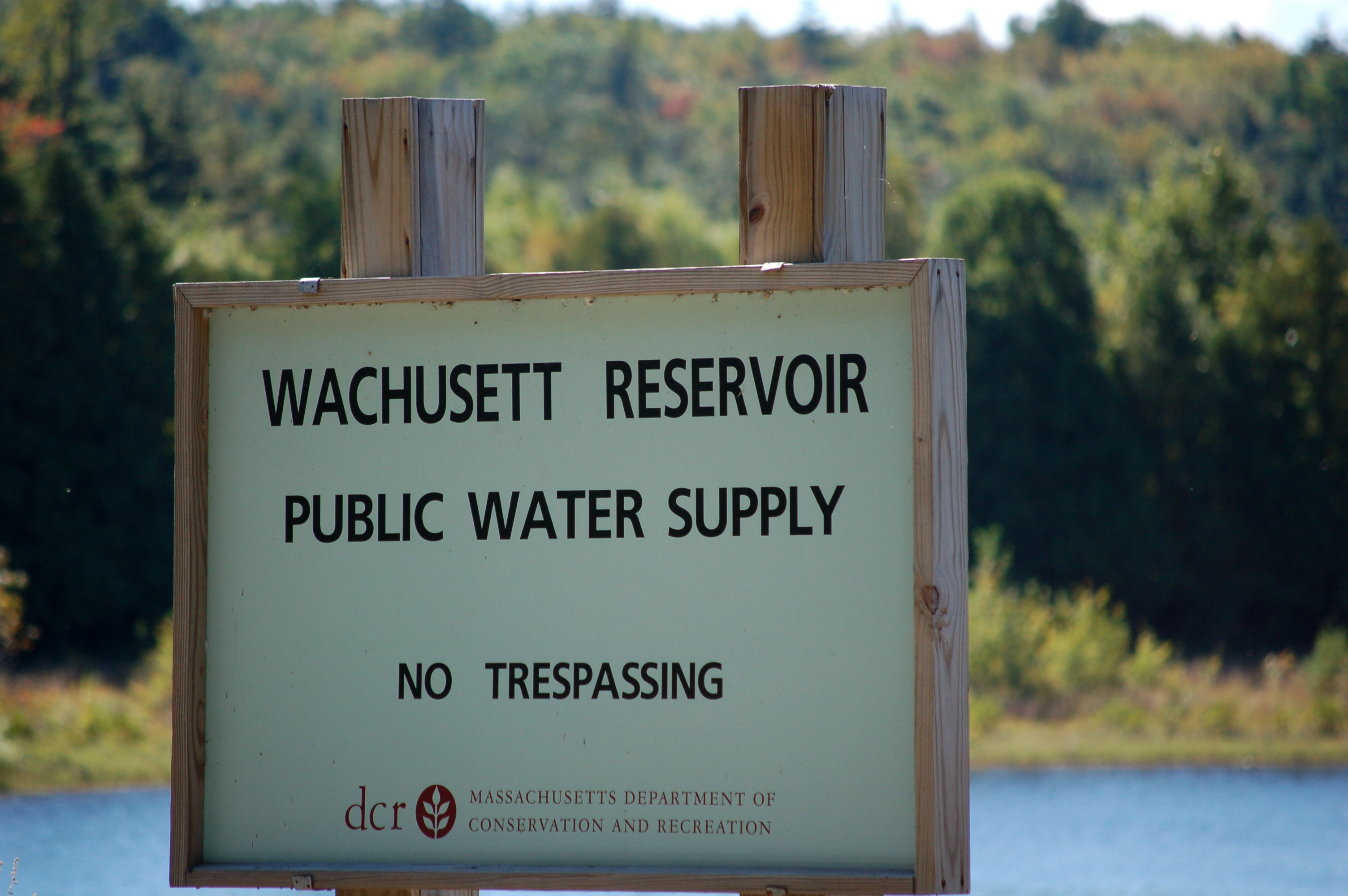

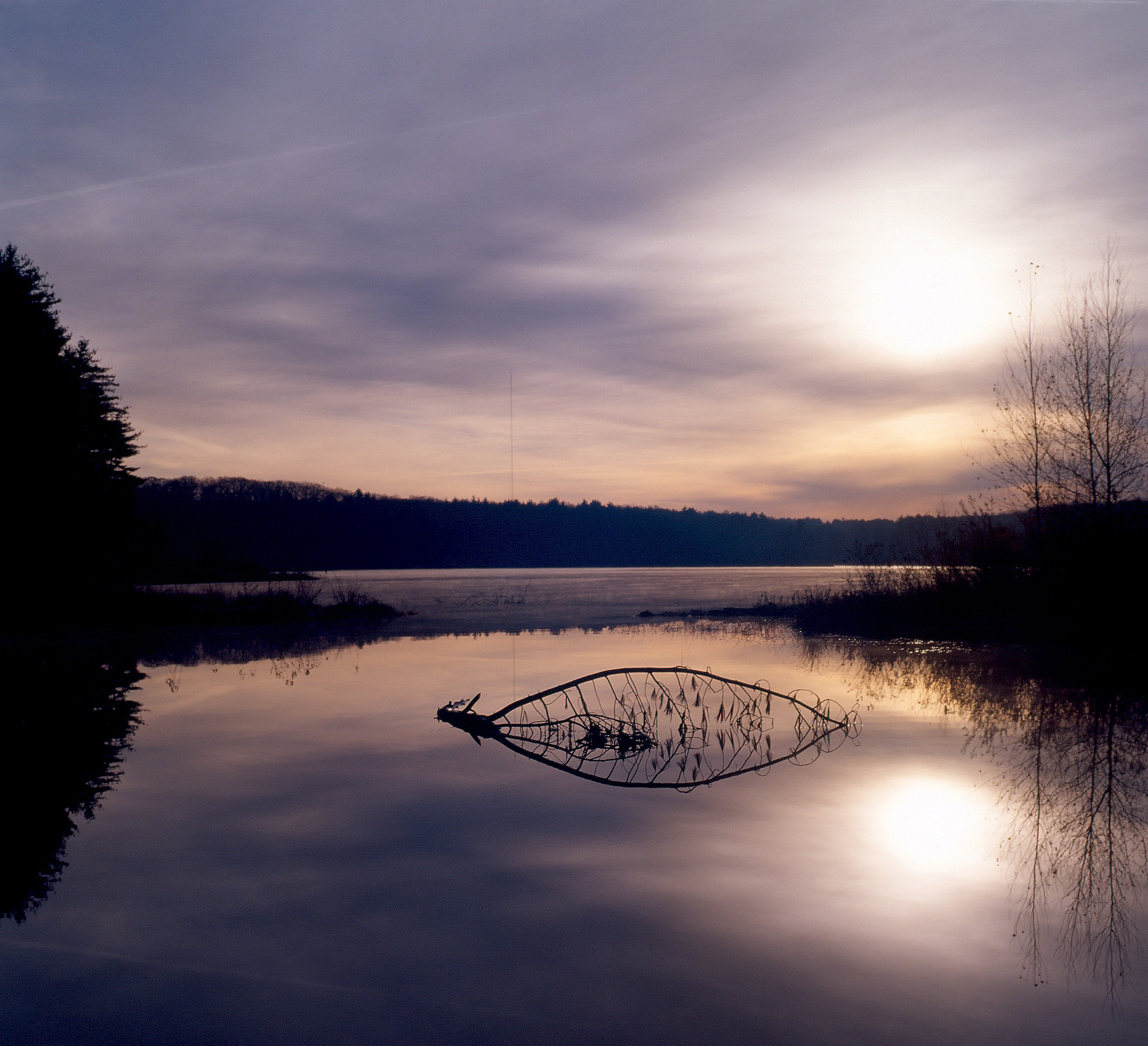
Wachusett Reservoir at sunrise

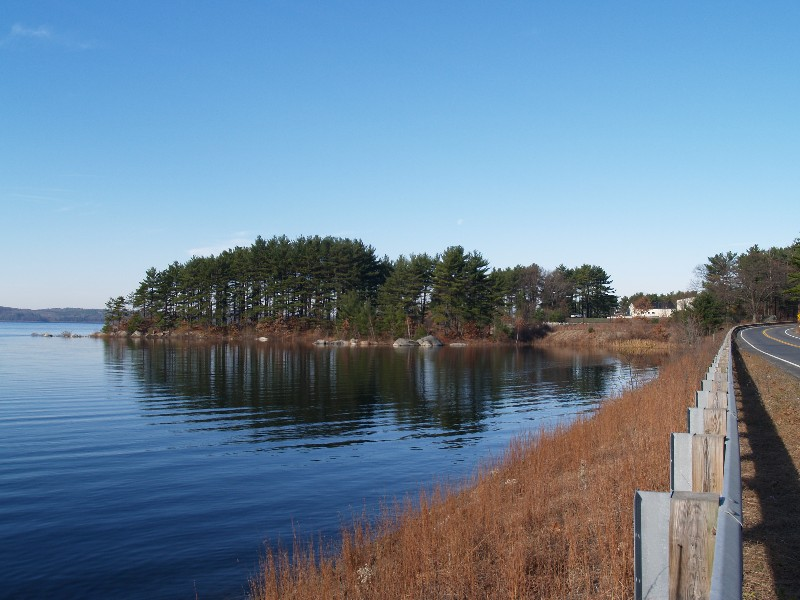
Reservoir from Route 70

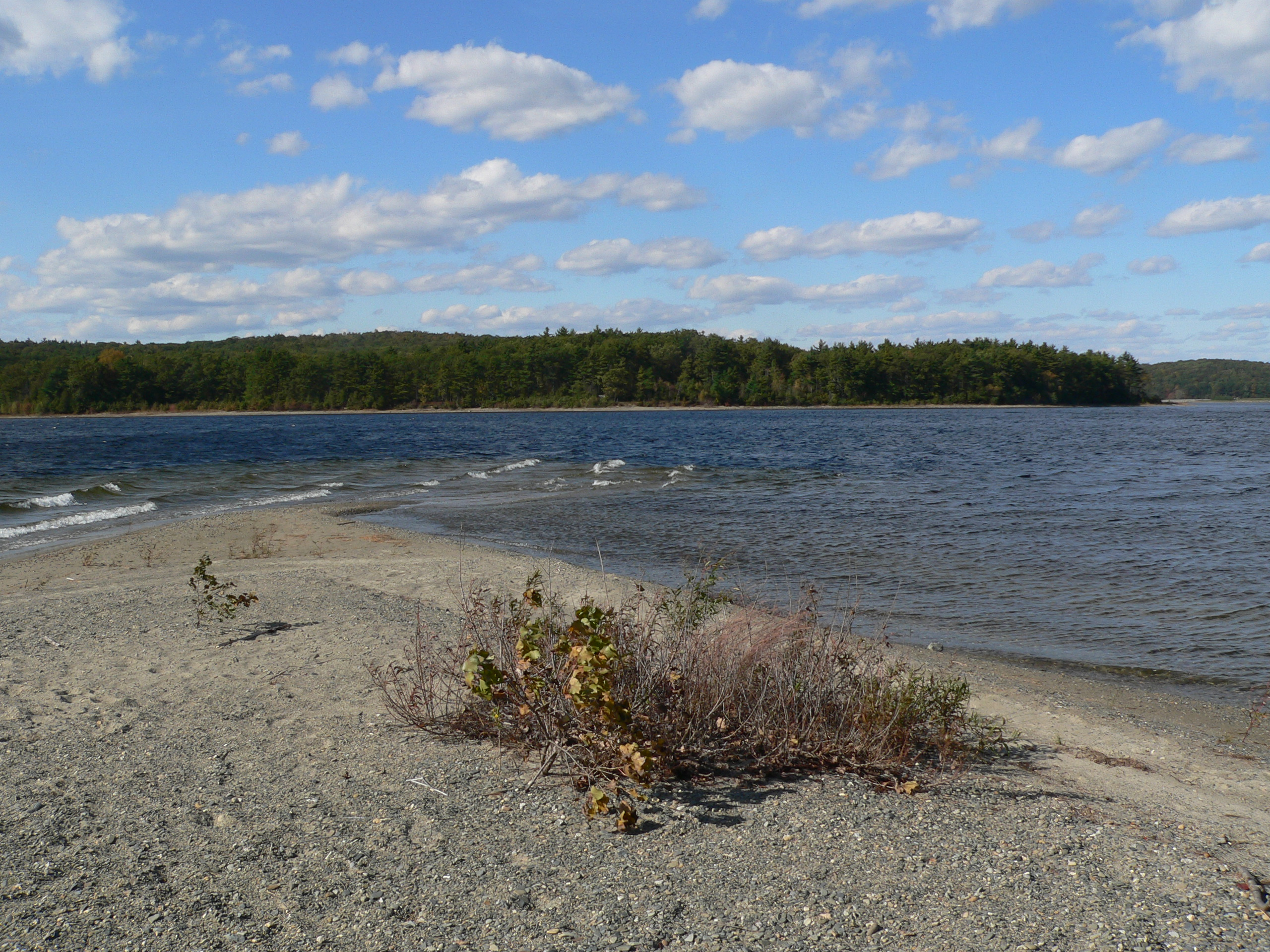

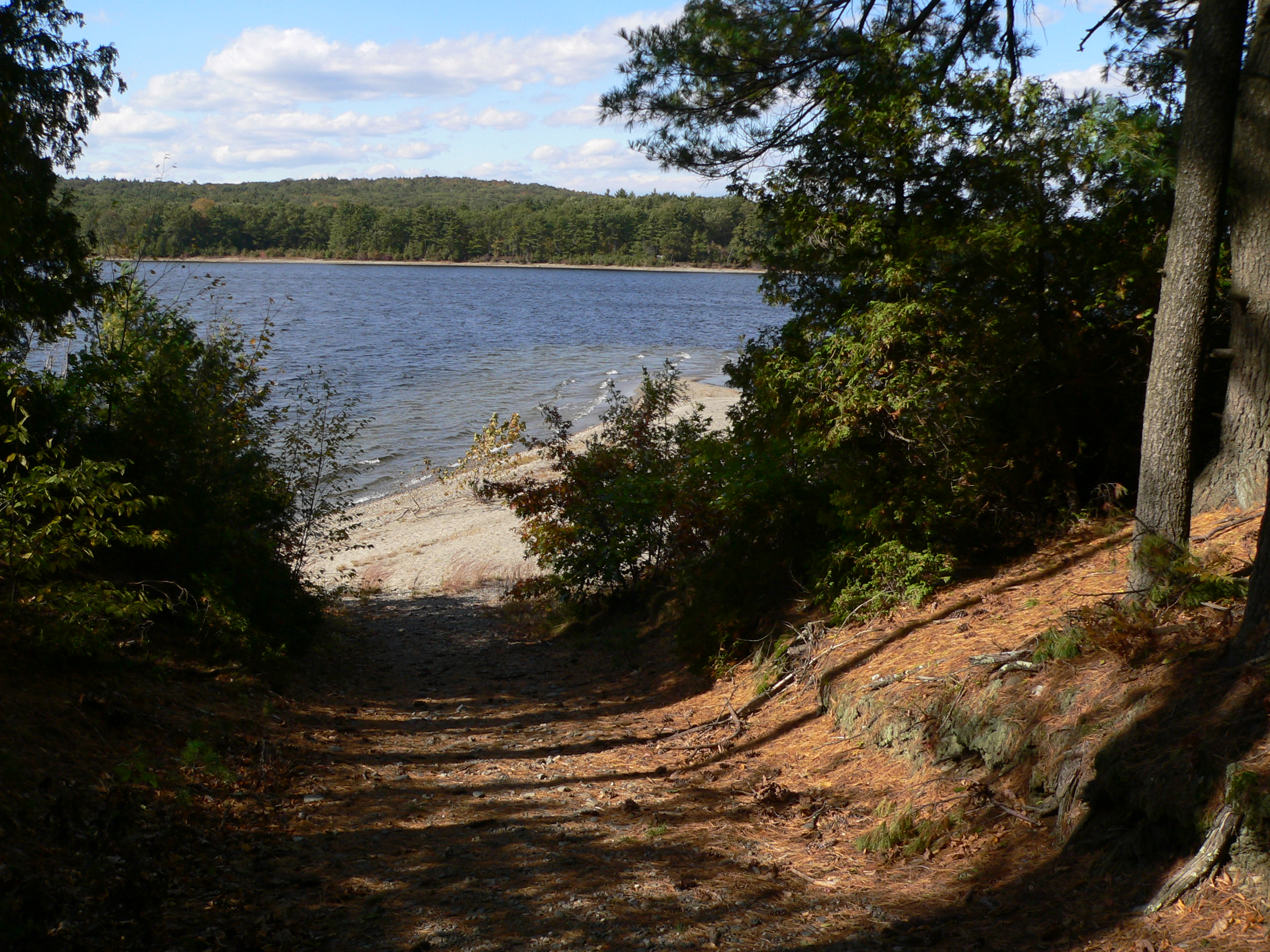
