= Cosgrove Aqueduct (Massachusetts) =

Water supply conduit for Greater Boston

Coordinates: 42°23′08″N 71°39′43″W

The Cosgrove Aqueduct, also called the Cosgrove Tunnel, forms part of the water supply system for the communities of the Greater Boston area in eastern Massachusetts that are served by the Massachusetts Water Resources Authority. It is a man-made tunnel connecting the eastern end of the Wachusett Reservoir to the John J. Carroll Water Treatment Plant in Marlborough. From the treatment plant, water is delivered to the Boston area primarily by the MetroWest Water Supply Tunnel.

The tunnel came on line in 1965, replacing the Wachusett Aqueduct as the main conduit used to deliver water from the Wachusett Reservoir. It has a capacity of 600 million US gallons (2.3 billion litres) per day. The Wachusett Aqueduct now forms part of the backup water supply system, and was briefly reactivated in 2003 to facilitate the interconnection of the Cosgrove Tunnel to the MetroWest Water Supply Tunnel.
