= Chestnut Hill Reservoir =

- View of Gasson Hall (Boston College) from across the reservoir

- Location within Massachusetts Location within the United States
- Location: Chestnut Hill, Boston, Massachusetts
- Coordinates: 42°20′6.30″N 71°9′30.52″W
- Type: reservoir
- Basin countries: United States

Chestnut Hill Reservoir is a reservoir located in the Chestnut Hill section of Boston, Massachusetts. It was created in 1870 on existing marshes and meadowland to supplement the city’s water needs. A 1.56 mile jogging loop abuts the reservoir. Chestnut Hill Reservoir was taken offline in 1978 as it was no longer needed for regular water supply distribution, but is maintained in emergency backup status. It is recognized today on the National Register of Historic Places and was designated as a Boston Landmark by the Boston Landmarks Commission in 1989.

On May 1, 2010, the Chestnut Hill Reservoir was temporarily brought back online during a failure of a connecting pipe at the end of the MetroWest Water Supply Tunnel. The Sudbury aqueduct was also activated to feed Chestnut Hill from the Foss and Sudbury reservoirs to keep the supply going. Separately the Spot Pond reservoir, also an emergency source, was tapped during the pipe break incident. Though a boil-water order was issued for fear that the water would not be safe to drink, following heavy treatment with chlorine later tests showed the water to be completely safe for drinking.

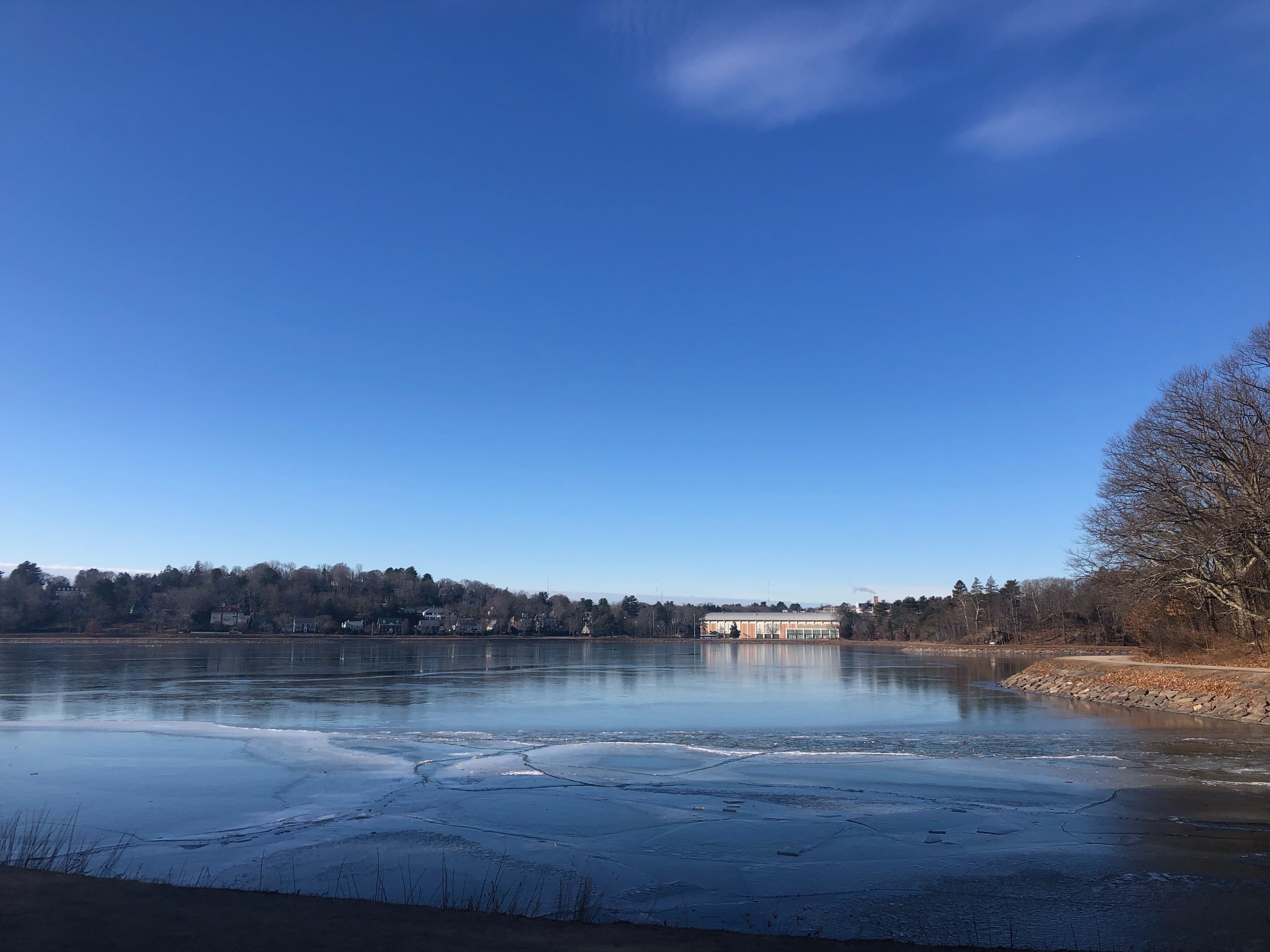
The reservoir in January. View of Boston College's Alumni Stadium across the water.

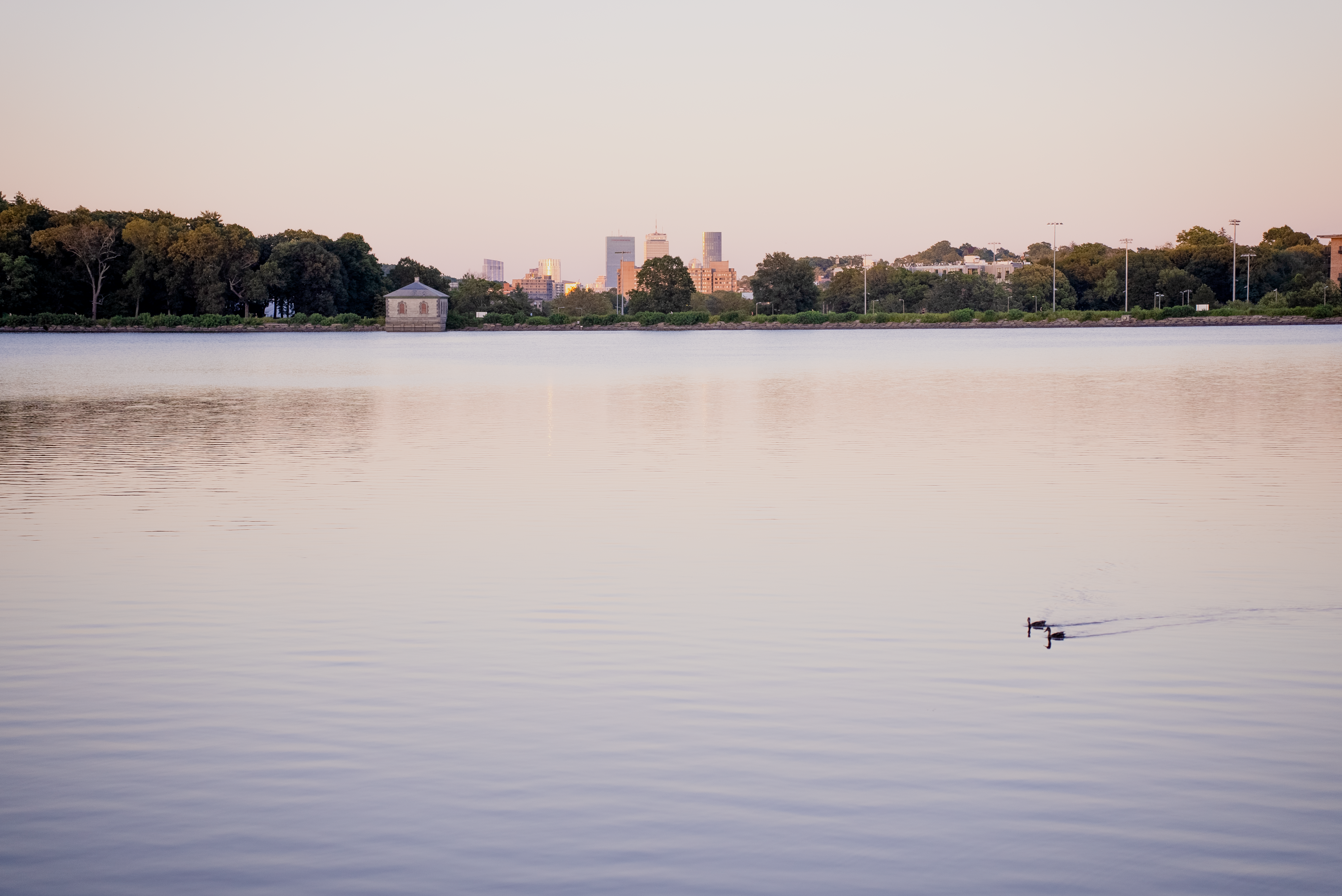
The Chestnut Hill Reservoir with Boston Skyline in background (August 2023)

== Transportation ==
- Reservoir, Green Line (D) (MBTA)
- Cleveland Circle, Green Line (C) (MBTA)
- Chestnut Hill Avenue, Green Line (B) (MBTA)

== See also ==
- Chestnut Hill Reservoir Historic District
- Chestnut Hill Reservation
