= Wachusett Aqueduct =

Aqueduct in the Greater Boston area

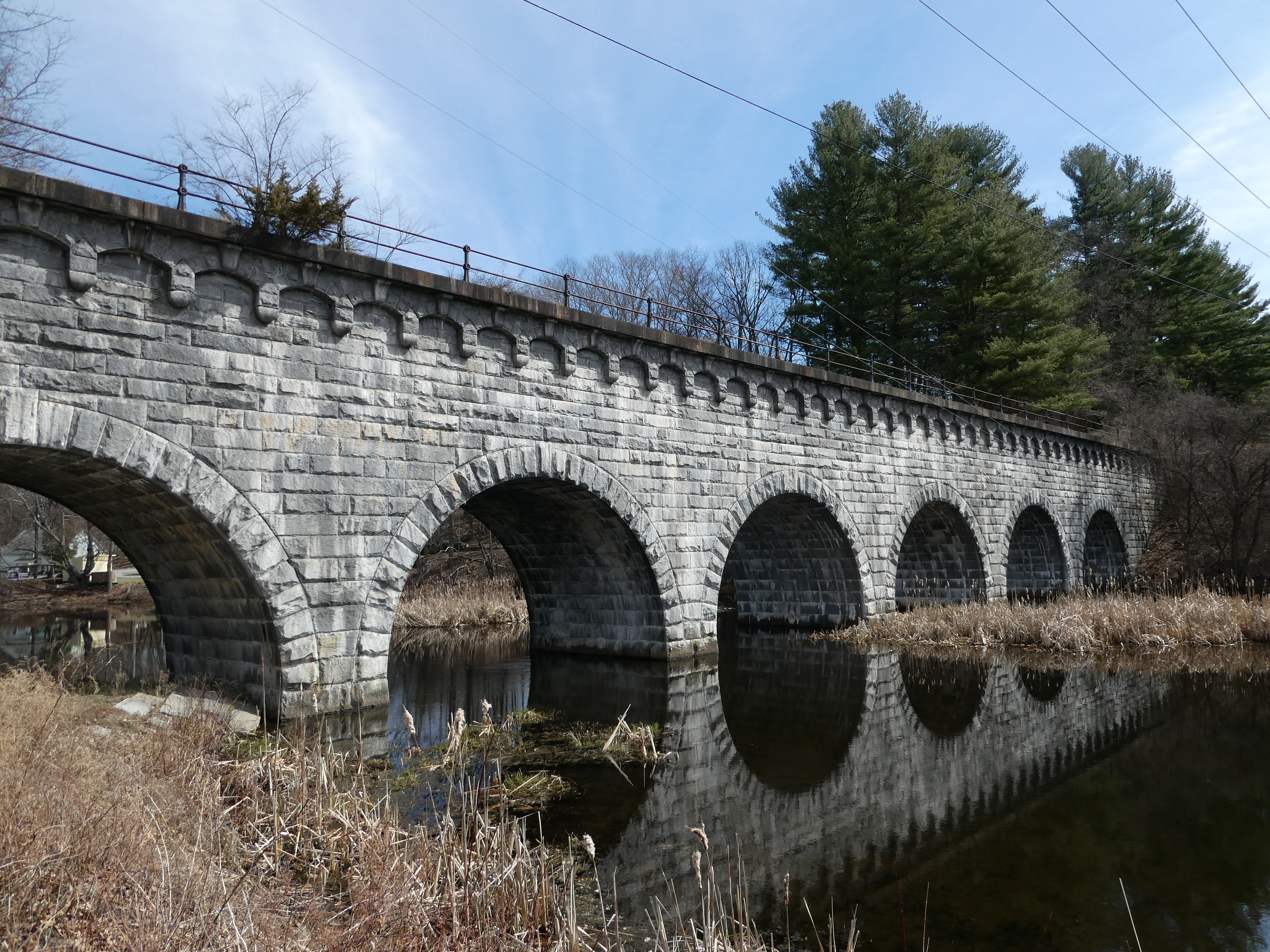
- Wachusett Aqueduct at Northborough spanning over the Assabet River
- Coordinates: 42°23′57″N 71°41′22″W
- Begins: Wachusett Reservoir
- Ends: Marlborough, Massachusetts
- Official name: Wachusett Aqueduct
- Maintained by: MWRA

Characteristics
- Total length: 9 mi (14.5 km)
- Width: 12 ft (3.7 m)
- Height: 11 ft (3.4 m)
- Capacity: 400 cu ft/s (11.33 m^{3}/s)

History
- Construction start: 1897
- Opened: 1905
- Wachusett Aqueduct Linear District
- U.S. National Register of Historic Places
- U.S. Historic district
- Built: 1896
- Architect: Frederick P. Stearns
- MPS: Water Supply System of Metropolitan Boston MPS
- NRHP reference No.: 89002276
- Added to NRHP: January 18, 1990

Location
- Interactive map of Wachusett Aqueduct

The Wachusett Aqueduct is a secondary aqueduct that carries water from the Wachusett Reservoir to the John J. Carroll Water Treatment Plant at Walnut Hill in Marlborough, Massachusetts. It is part of the public water supply system for the communities of Greater Boston that are served by the Massachusetts Water Resources Authority (MWRA), which manages the aqueduct. The aqueduct serves as a standby backup to the Cosgrove Tunnel.

== Physical characteristics ==
The Wachusett Aqueduct extends from the Wachusett Reservoir in Clinton, through Berlin and Northborough, to the John J. Carroll Water Treatment Plant at Walnut Hill in Marlborough, Massachusetts. This 9-mile (14 km) long water system consists of 2 miles (3 km) of hard rock tunnel and 7 miles (11 km) of 11-foot (3.4 m) high horseshoe-shaped underground aqueduct constructed of non-reinforced concrete with a brick-lined invert. It is not constructed entirely underground and there are several elevated sections. The final portion of the aqueduct, taken out of service in 2005 with the opening of the treatment plant, is an open channel running from near the treatment facility to Sudbury Reservoir.

== Modern use ==
Until the 1960s, the Wachusett Aqueduct was the main conduit used to deliver water from the Wachusett Reservoir. At that time, it carried 300 million US gallons (1,100,000 m^{3}) of water each day (13 m^{3}/s). The Cosgrove Tunnel replaced it in 1965 as the primary water transmission aqueduct. Because of the construction of the Walnut Hill Water Treatment Plant in Marlborough, the Cosgrove Tunnel was shut down in 2003 in order to make the large piping connection between the new treatment plant and the MWRA's new MetroWest Water Supply Tunnel. The MetroWest Tunnel extends east 18.6 miles (29.9 km) from Walnut Hill to Weston. During that shutdown, the Wachusett Aqueduct was the primary method of transmission of about 240 million US gallons (910,000 m^{3}) of water per day. The section of the Wachusett Aqueduct between the Wachusett Reservoir and the treatment plant remains a standby backup transmission path in the event the Cosgrove Tunnel is unavailable, while the open channel between the treatment plant and the Sudbury Reservoir remains an emergency backup transmission path in the event of a major problem with the treatment plant or the primary transmission pathways between the treatment plant and the water system.

The aqueduct's route and supporting structures were added to the National Register of Historic Places in 1990.

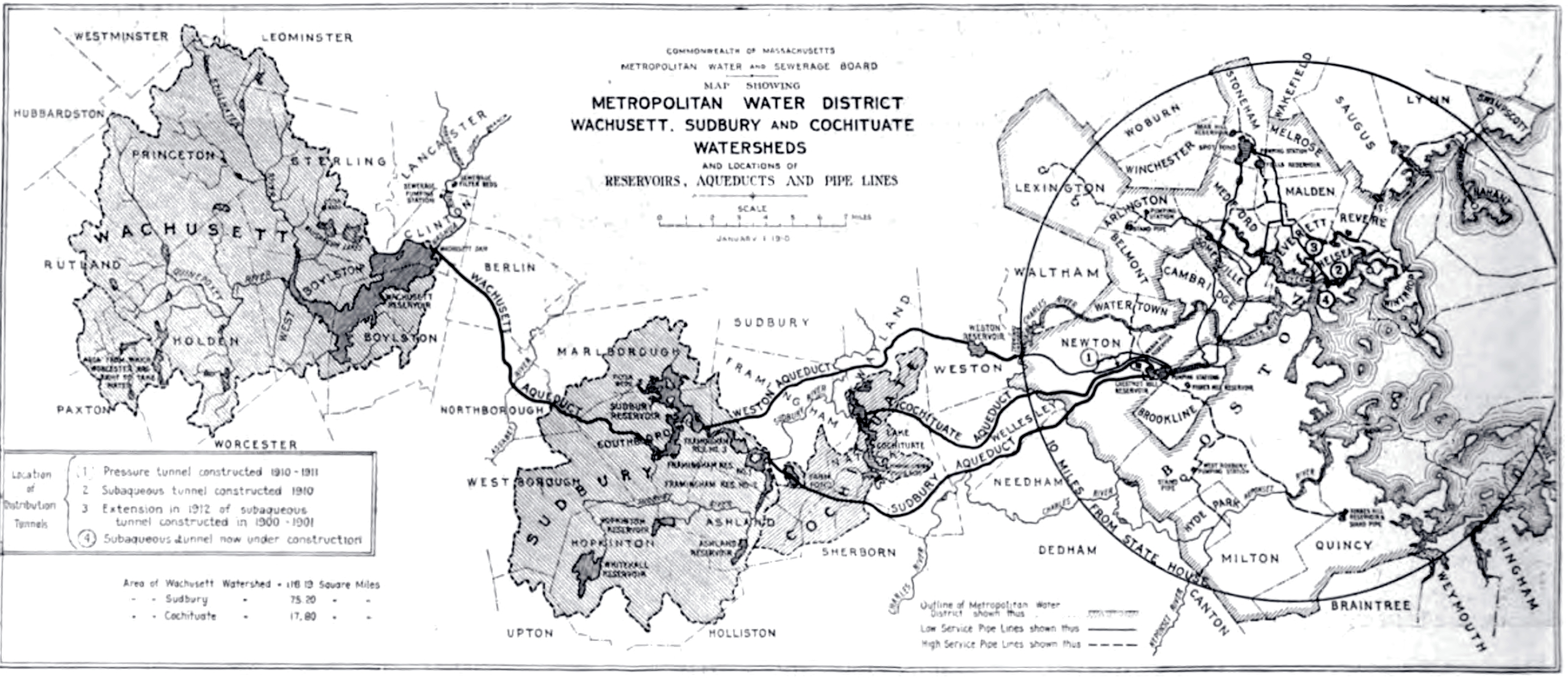
Wachusett Aqueduct in context

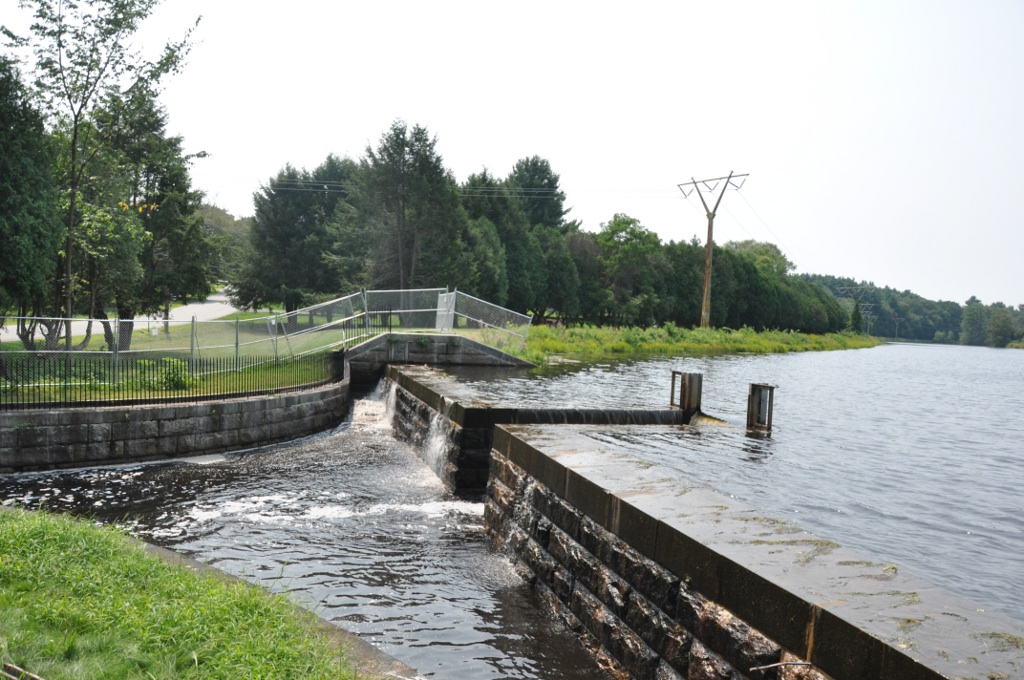
The lower dam across the open portion of the aqueduct in Southborough

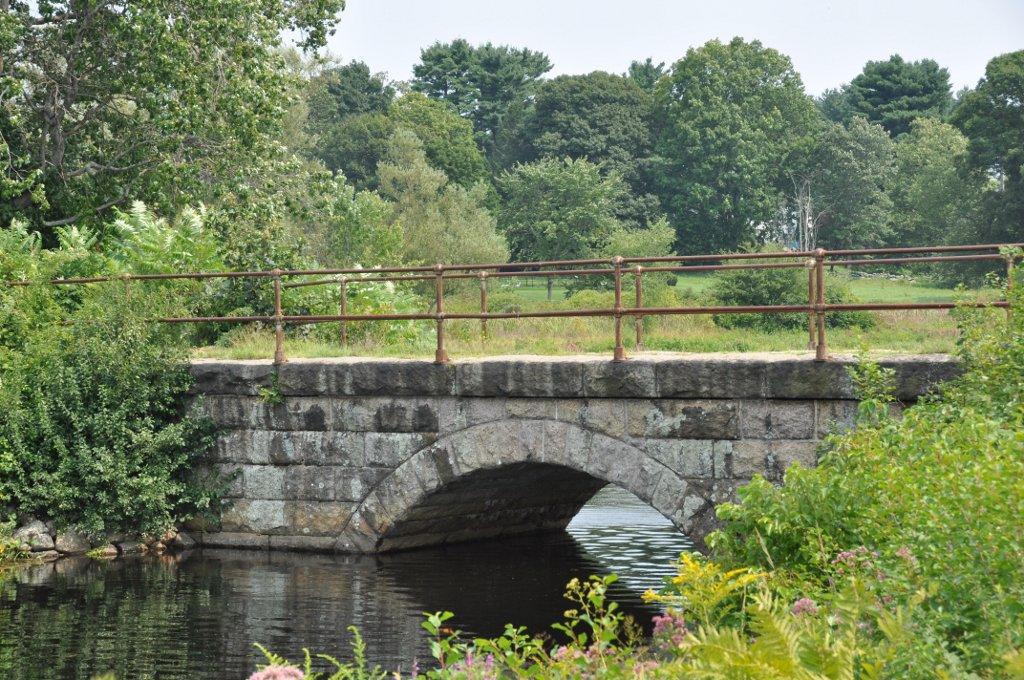
A bridge (now only carrying foot traffic) over the open portion of the aqueduct
