= MetroWest Water Supply Tunnel =

Underground aqueduct in Greater Boston

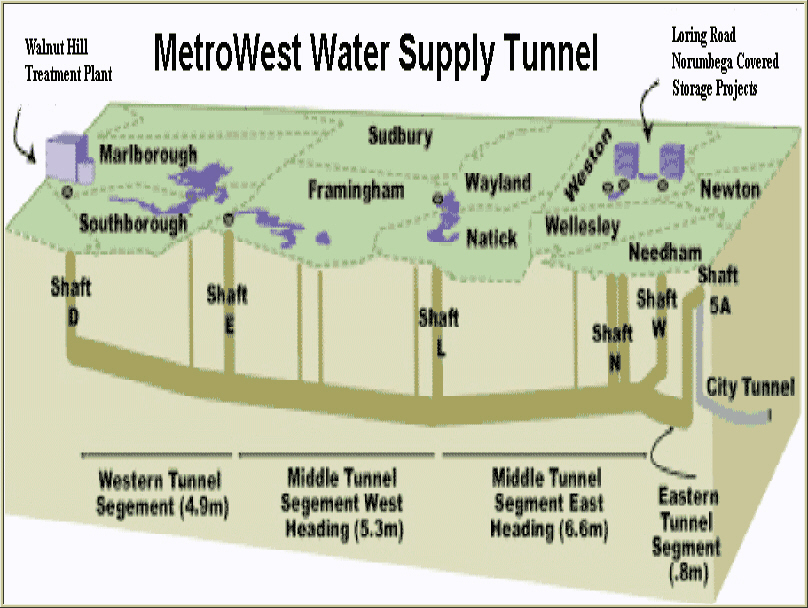
- MetroWest Water Supply Tunnel
- Coordinates: 42°18′40″N 71°35′06″W
- Begins: Marlborough
- Ends: Weston
- Official name: MWWST
- Maintained by: MWRA

Characteristics
- Total length: 17.6 mi (28.3 km)
- Diameter: 14 ft (4.3 m)
- Capacity: 1.893×10^{6} m^{3} per day (500×10^{6} US gal)

History
- Construction start: 1996
- Opened: November 2003

Location
- Interactive map of MetroWest Water Supply Tunnel

The MetroWest Water Supply Tunnel (MWWST) is an advanced underground aqueduct that supplies potable water to residents of much of Greater Boston. It is part of the Massachusetts Water Resources Authority (MWRA) water supply system, having entered operation in November 2003.

This aqueduct starts at the John J. Carroll Water Treatment Plant in Marlborough, Massachusetts, and ends at an MWRA terminal in Weston, Massachusetts. It is about 17.6 miles (28.3 km) long (28.3 km) and is constructed far below ground level, mostly in bedrock. It includes several vertical risers called shafts, lined with steel, used to make connections throughout the system. It is built underneath portions of Marlborough, Southborough, Framingham, Wayland, and Weston, Massachusetts, with a wye intersection 235 feet (71.6 m) below the Massachusetts Turnpike former toll booths at State Route 128.

== History ==
In 1989, the Massachusetts Water Resources Authority (MWRA) issued a planning and design contract for a second transmission main to provide redundancy for the Hultman Aqueduct. As originally conceived, the project consisted of a tunnel combined with reconstruction of the Sudbury Aqueduct, a 19th-century construction that had been taken out of service in 1978. During feasibility studies, it was recognized that costs and environmental and community impact issues related to reconstruction of the Sudbury Aqueduct through an urban/suburban area compared unfavorably with a full length tunnel in rock, deep under existing structures and facilities. The alignment of the tunnel generally coincides with the existing Hultman Aqueduct and is constructed in permanent underground easements below several hundred private properties. The full length, unreinforced concrete lined, pressure tunnel design concept was selected and the facility was named the MetroWest Water Supply Tunnel.

After fewer than seven years of service, on the morning of May 1, 2010, the tunnel's connection to the City Tunnel Extension failed, dumping its full capacity of 8 million gallons per hour into the Charles River and forcing 2 million water customers in Boston and surrounding communities to boil their water before drinking it. Emergency supplies from such locations as the Chestnut Hill Reservoir were exposed to air and therefore were susceptible to contamination by animal waste.

== Redundancy ==
It was determined that the tunnel would be redundant to the existing Hultman Aqueduct by connecting Shaft C on the existing Cosgrove Tunnel in the west with Shaft 5 on the existing City Tunnel, and with the Weston Aqueduct Terminal Chamber Area in the east end. These criteria resulted in terminal connections at Shafts D, 5A and W, respectively, and definition of the general alignment of the tunnel facility. Additional major connections to existing MWRA transmission facilities resulted in Shaft E, Shaft L, Shaft NW and Shaft NE. Connections to serve community clients resulted in the five small diameter riser shafts to supply water to customers along the tunnel alignment.

== Technical data ==
The water pressure hydraulic grade level (HGL) corresponding to the maximum water surface elevation of the Wachusett Reservoir, feeding the proposed facility by gravity from an overflow elevation of 120.4 m (395 ft Boston City Base Datum, BCB), was selected by the MWRA for design criteria. HGL is used, instead of elevation, data because it is significantly more precise than elevation data. Because 2.31 feet (0.70 m) of elevation translates into 1 psi of pressure (for water), calculating pressure to 1 psi precision requires elevation data that's accurate to roughly 2 feet (0.61 m). Normal elevation data that is accurate to the nearest 10 feet (3.0 m) will result in pressure that is accurate to roughly 4 psi.

=== Pressure ===
A 120.4 m (395 ft) HGL is used for design of the tunnel from Shaft D to Shaft NW at the Norumbega Reservoir, so water could continue to be stored for distribution to the Boston area. The remaining downstream portion of the MWWST facility, Shaft NE to Shaft 5A andShaft W, is designed for an HGL of 88.4 m (290 ft BCB). The design transient pressure was determined by hydraulic analysis of the overall future transmission system, including accounting for characteristics of control mechanisms, e.g., shutting times for major valves or catastrophic type changes in flow rate. The resulting design transient pressure for the MWWST facility is 15.2 m (50 ft) of head increase, or approximately 137.9 kPa (20 psi). This transient pressure is used for design of impermeable lining system components, i.e., localized steel linings in the shafts and tunnels.

=== Flow rate ===
The design flow rate used in hydraulic analysis for the MWWST facility was 1.893 million m^{3} (500 million USgal) per day. In addition to meeting the fundamental hydraulic requirements of operation, such as flow capacities and operating hydraulic characteristics, additional important operations and maintenance provisions require identification and incorporation in the design, including provisions for future reentry into the tunnels and associated unwatering and safe future access for workers and some essential equipment. For the MWWST tunnel conduits, all projected flow velocities are less than 3 m (10 ft) per second and thus acceptable for all envisioned types of lining systems.

=== Aqueduct diameters ===
The selected inside diameter of the MWWST tunnel conduit is 4.3 m (14 ft) from Shaft D to the Norumbega Reservoir and 3.7 m (12 ft) for the remainder to Shaft 5A and Shaft W. The shaft conduits vary from 3.7 m (12 ft) to 2.4 m (8 ft), depending on the location, metering, hydraulic and future access requirements. There are five small-diameter community riser shafts of 0.51 m (30 in).

== Maintenance ==
Incorporated into the design are considerations for filling and unwatering (e.g., air release/vacuum valves, filling/unwatering procedures and requirements for pumping), as well as the need and means for metering of flows during operation. Accommodations to inspect and maintain the tunnel is access through the shaft conduits by proper sizing of manholes and access hatches, invert gradients (the tunnel must generally slope toward the access shafts) and locating the metering devices at accessible locations.
