= National Register of Historic Places listings in Massachusetts =

Distribution of listings by county as of January 2025

The National Register of Historic Places is a United States federal official list of places and sites considered worthy of preservation. In the state of Massachusetts, there are over 4,300 listings, representing about 5% of all NRHP listings nationwide and the second-most of any U.S. state, behind only New York. Listings appear in all 14 Massachusetts counties.

Contents: Counties in Massachusetts

Barnstable | Berkshire | Bristol | Dukes | Essex | Franklin | Hampden | Hampshire | Middlesex | Nantucket | Norfolk | Plymouth | Suffolk | Worcester

This National Park Service list is complete through NPS recent listings posted November 6, 2026.

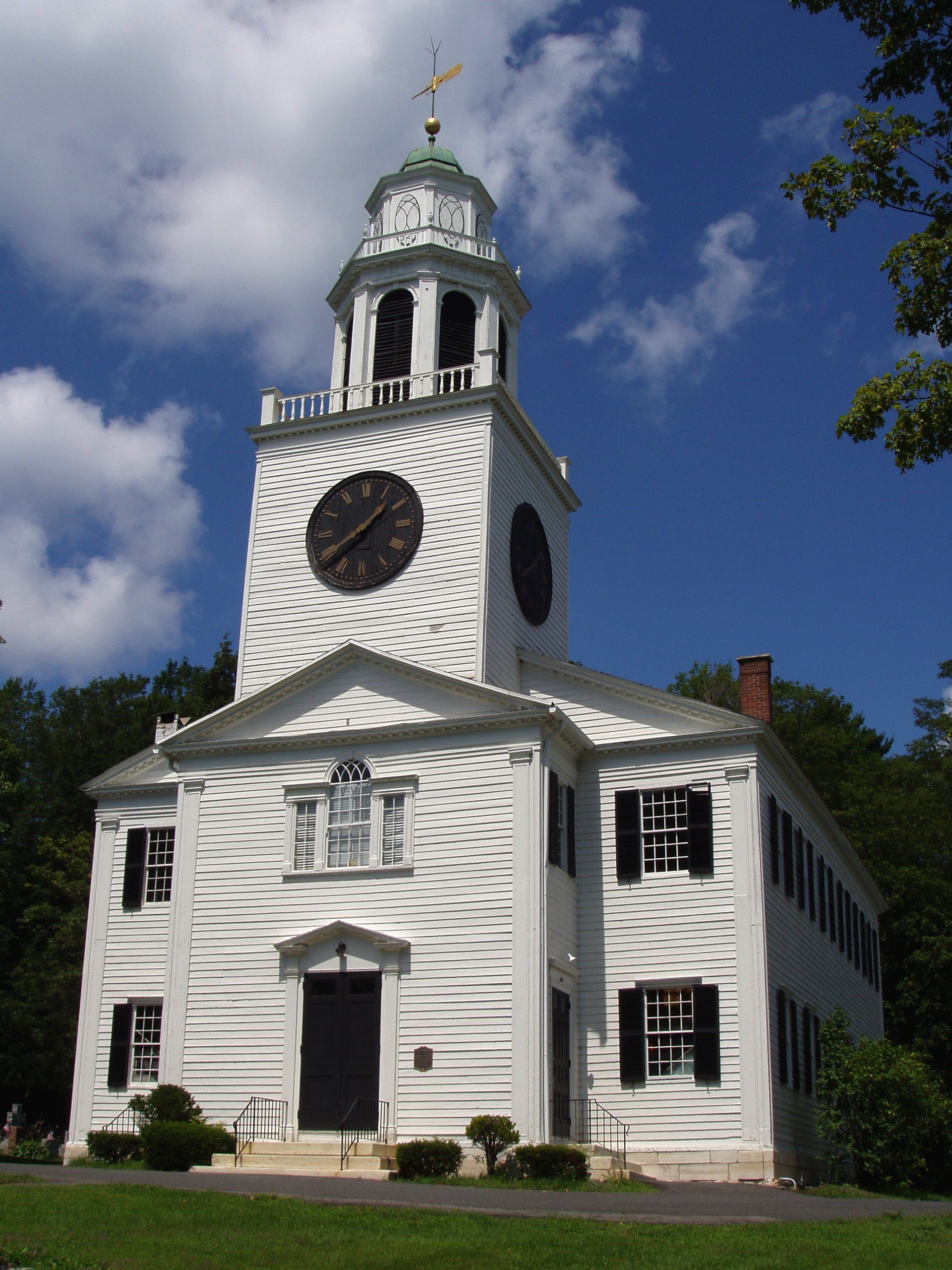
Church on the Hill, in Berkshire County

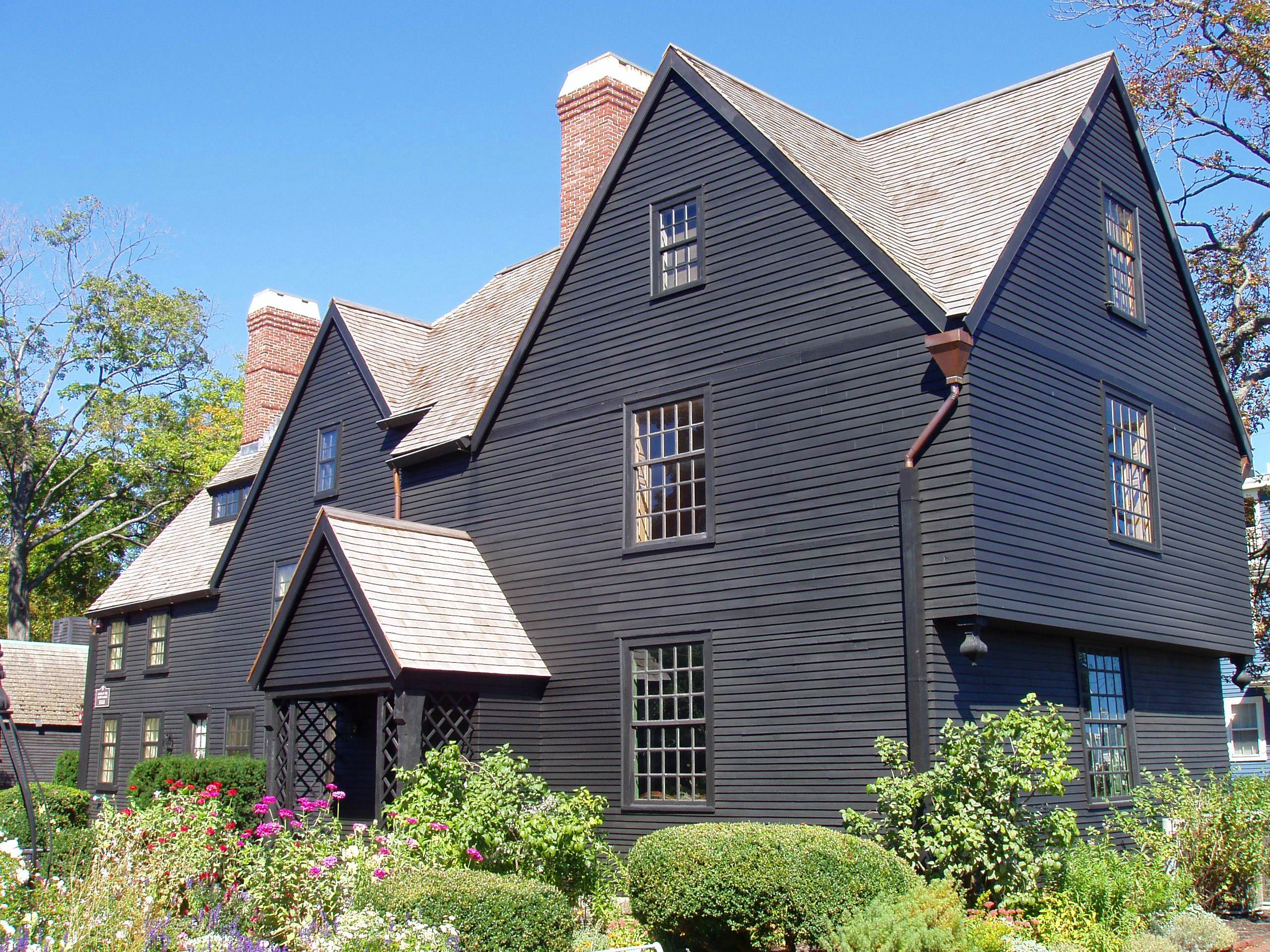
House of the Seven Gables, in Salem, Essex County

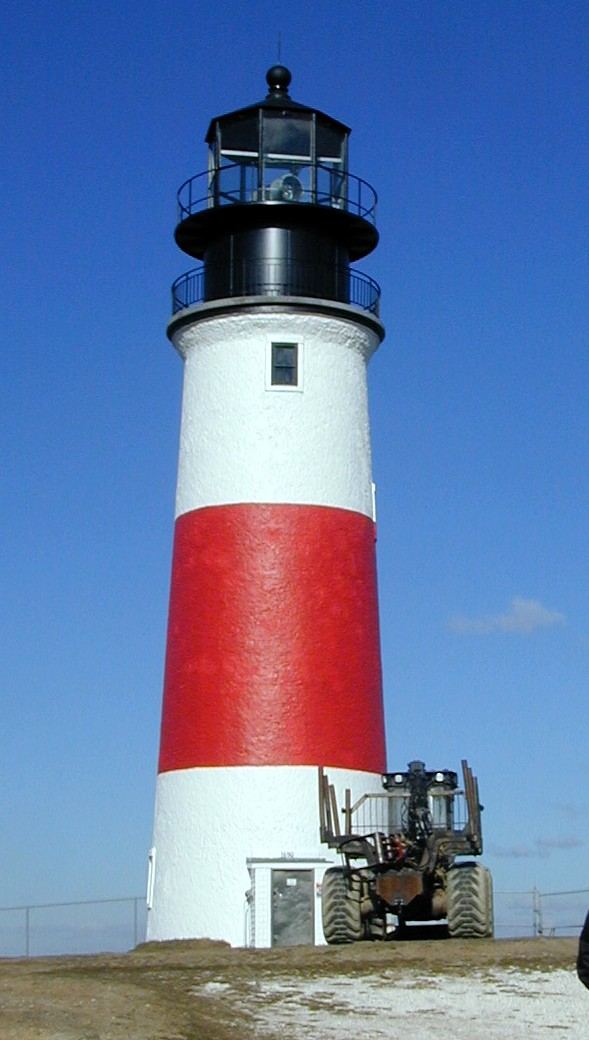
Sankaty Head Light, in Nantucket

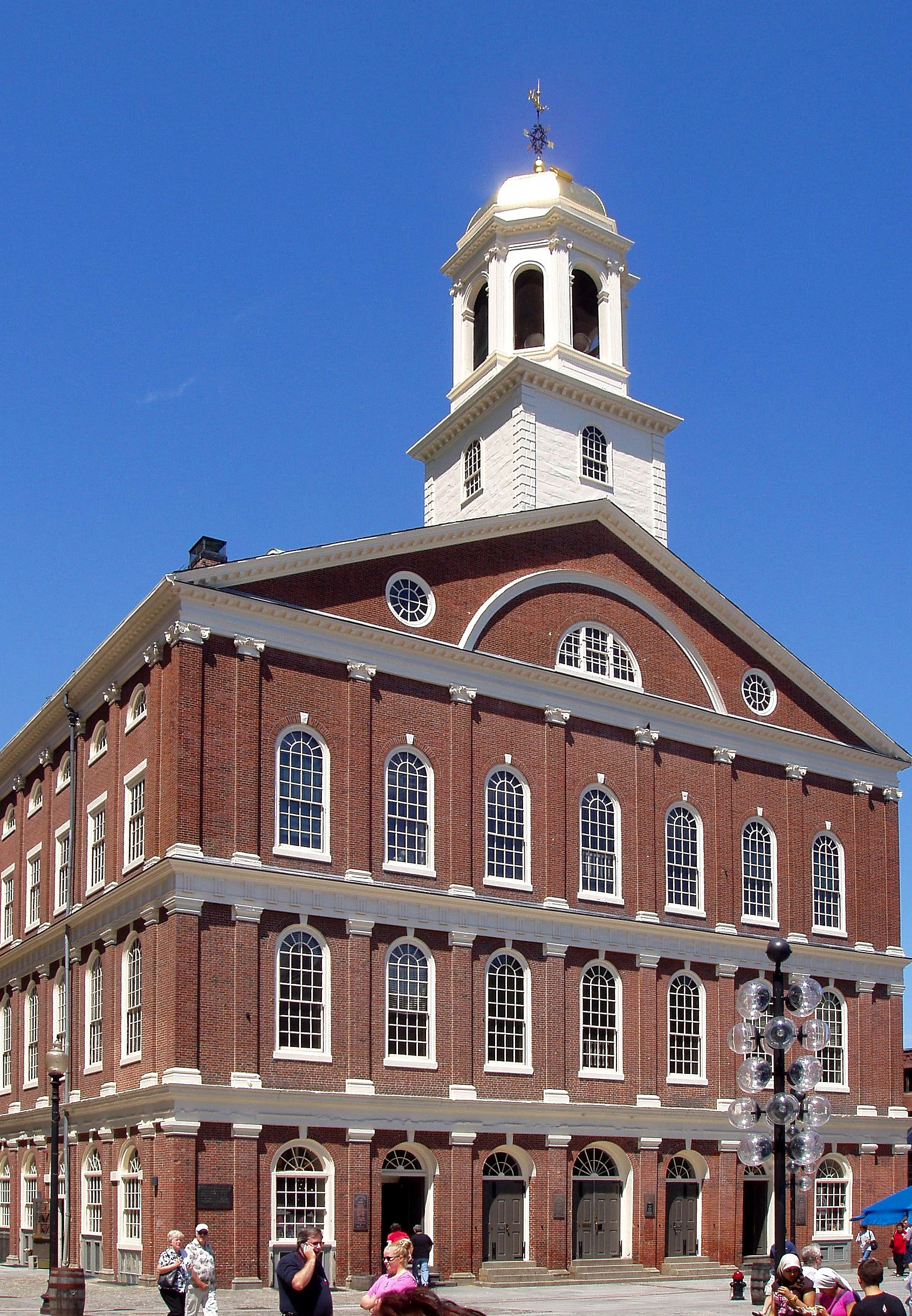
Faneuil Hall, Boston, Suffolk County

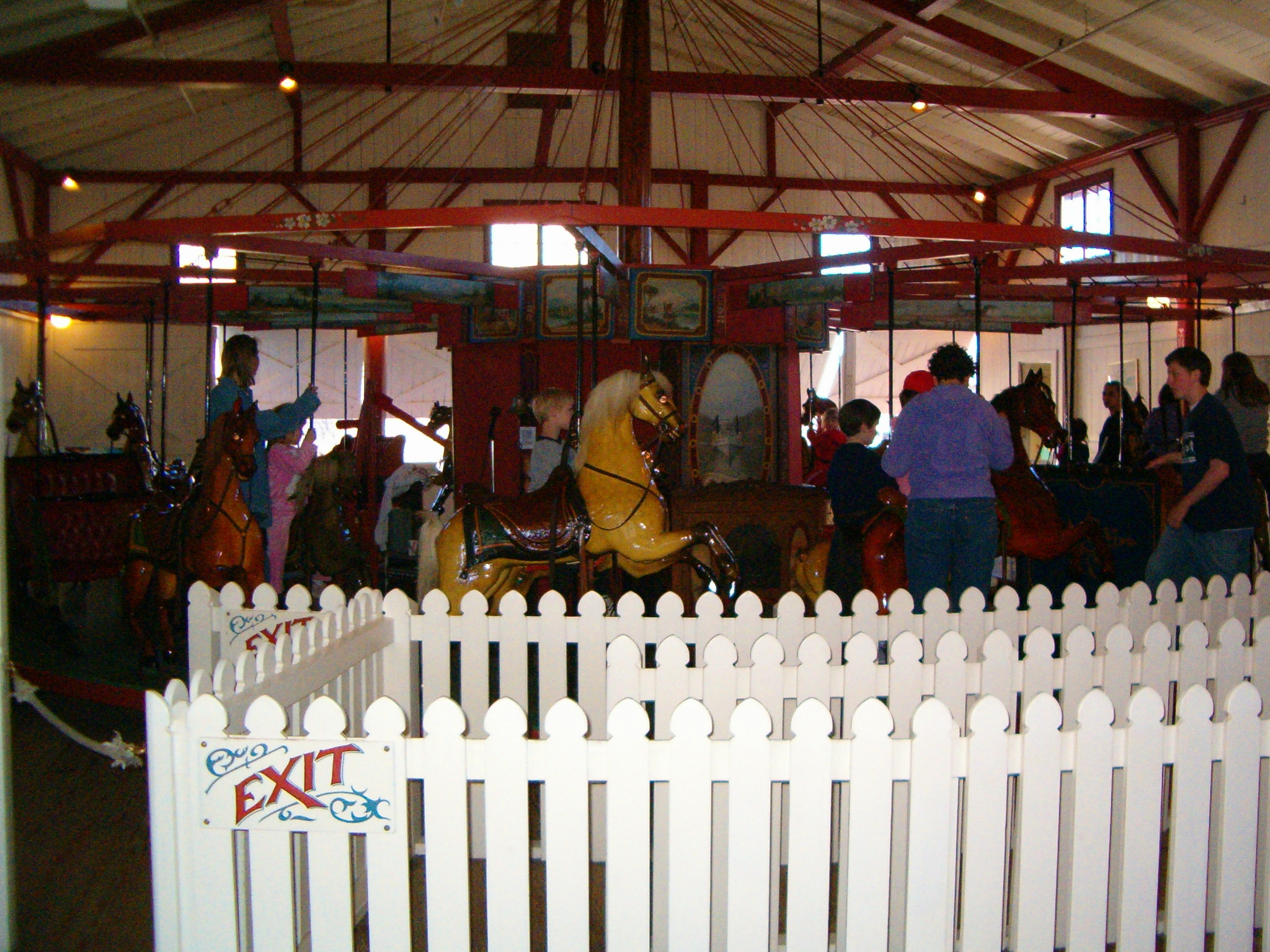
The Flying Horses Carousel, Oak Bluffs, Martha's Vineyard, Dukes County

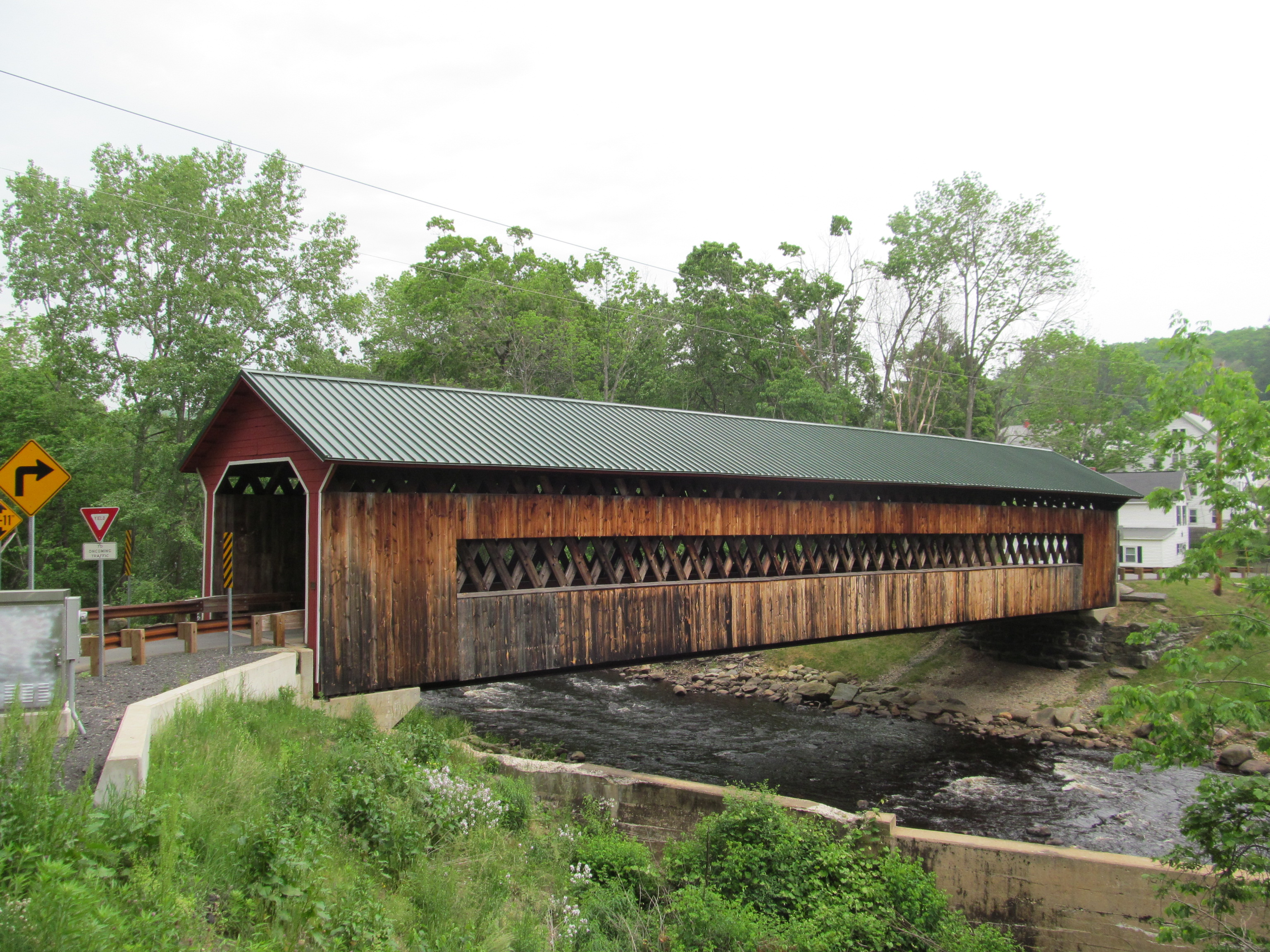
The Ware-Hardwick Covered Bridge, Hampshire and Worcester Counties

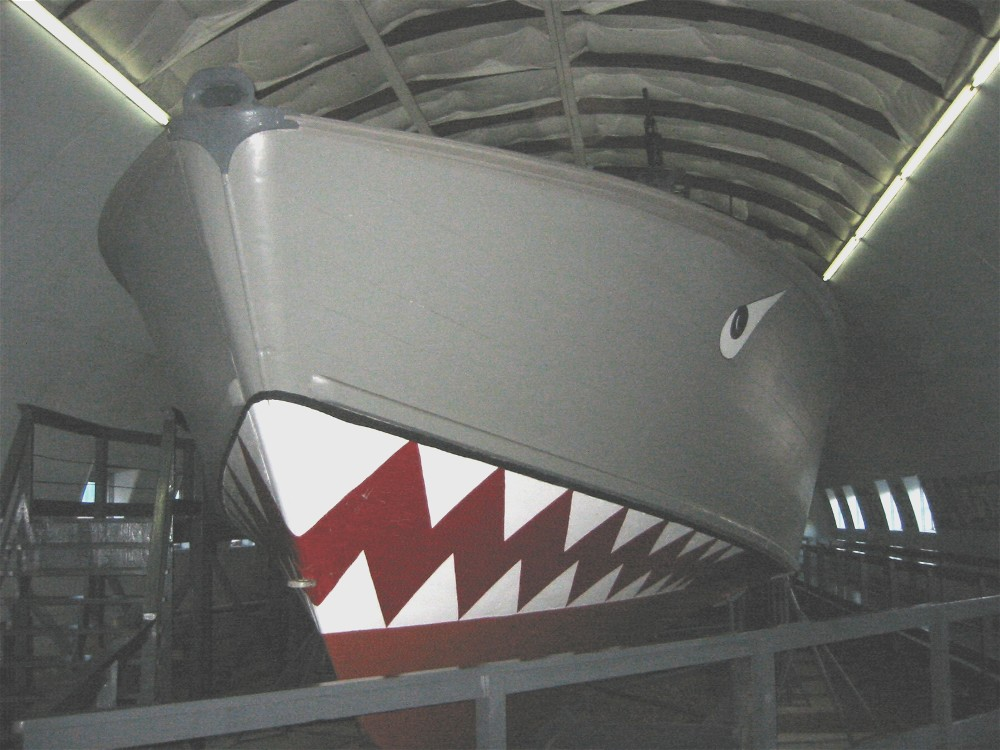
The PT 796, Fall River, Bristol County

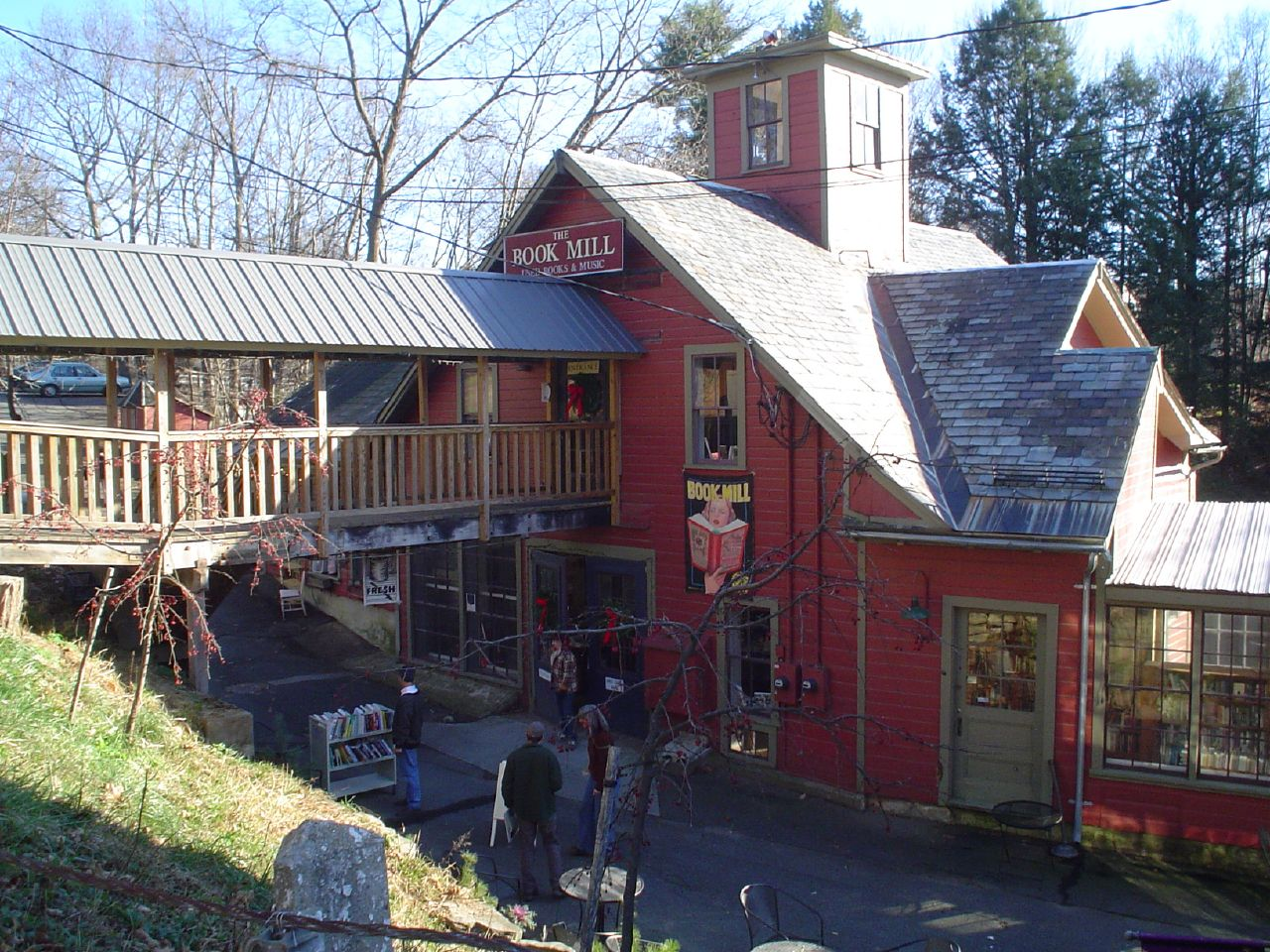
The Alvah Stone Mill, Montague, Franklin County

	County	# of sites
1.1	Barnstable: Barnstable	86
1.3	Barnstable: Other	127
1.4	Barnstable: Duplicates	(4) (Note: The following historic resource within Barnstable County is included on multiple area lists: Yarmouth Camp Ground Historic District (Barnstable and Other); Town Boundary Marker (Barnstable and Other); Town Line Boundary Marker (Great Hill Road, Barnstable, Massachusetts) (Barnstable and Other); Town Line Boundary Marker (410 High Street, Barnstable, Massachusetts) (Barnstable and Other))
1.5	Barnstable: Total	209
2	Berkshire	181
3.1	Bristol: Fall River	109
3.2	Bristol: New Bedford	42
3.3	Bristol: Taunton	97
3.4	Bristol: Other	139
3.5	Bristol: Duplicates	(1) (Note: The following historic resource within Bristol County is included on multiple area lists: Head of the River Historic District (New Bedford and Acushnet))
3.6	Bristol: Total	386
4	Dukes	23
5.1	Essex: Andover	51
5.2	Essex: Gloucester	35
5.3	Essex: Ipswich	31
5.4	Essex: Lawrence	24
5.5	Essex: Lynn	31
5.6	Essex: Methuen	45
5.7	Essex: Salem	46
5.8	Essex: Other	225
5.9	Essex: Duplicates	(3) (Note: The following historic resources within Essex County are included on multiple area lists: Arlington Mills Historic District (Lawrence and Methuen); Bellevue Cemetery (Lawrence and Methuen); Nahant Beach Boulevard (Lynn and other Essex County))
5.10	Essex: Total	485
6	Franklin	61
7.1	Hampden: Springfield	92
7.2	Hampden: Other	80
7.3	Hampden: Total	172
8	Hampshire	84
9.1	Middlesex: Arlington	64
9.2	Middlesex: Cambridge	207
9.3	Middlesex: Concord	27
9.4	Middlesex: Framingham	20
9.5	Middlesex: Lexington	17
9.6	Middlesex: Lowell	41
9.7	Middlesex: Marlborough	17
9.8	Middlesex: Medford	36
9.9	Middlesex: Newton	188
9.10	Middlesex: Reading	89
9.11	Middlesex: Sherborn	24
9.12	Middlesex: Somerville	84
9.13	Middlesex: Stoneham	69
9.14	Middlesex: Wakefield	95
9.15	Middlesex: Waltham	109
9.16	Middlesex: Weston	15
9.17	Middlesex: Winchester	68
9.18	Middlesex: Other	197
9.19	Middlesex: Duplicates	(31) (Note: The following historic resources within Middlesex County are included on multiple area lists: Charles River Reservation Parkways (Cambridge, Newton, Waltham, Weston, and other Middlesex County); Edmund Dwight House (Arlington, Winchester); Fells Connector Parkways, Metropolitan System of Greater Boston (Medford and other Middlesex County); Sudbury Aqueduct Linear District (Framingham, other Middlesex County, Newton, and Sherborn); Isaac Davis Trail (Concord and other Middlesex County); Metropolitan State Hospital (Lexington, Waltham and other Middlesex County); Middlesex Canal (Lowell and other Middlesex County); Middlesex Canal Historic and Archaeological District (Lowell, Winchester, Medford, Somerville, and other Middlesex County); Middlesex Fells Reservation Parkways (Medford, other Middlesex County, Stoneham, and Winchester); Middlesex Fells Reservoirs Historic District (Stoneham and Medford); Alewife Brook Parkway (Cambridge and Somerville); Almshouse (Cambridge, Massachusetts) (Cambridge and Somerville); Mystic Valley Parkway, Metropolitan Park System of Greater Boston MPS (Arlington, Medford, Somerville, and Winchester); Revere Beach Parkway-Metropolitan Park System of Greater Boston (Everett, Medford, and other Middlesex County); Weston Aqueduct Linear District (Framingham, Weston, and other Middlesex County); Mystic Dam (Arlington and Medford); Stone's Bridge (Framingham and other Middlesex County))
9.20	Middlesex: Total	1,336
10	Nantucket	4
11.1	Norfolk: Brookline	98
11.2	Norfolk: Milton	30
11.3	Norfolk: Quincy	110
11.4	Norfolk: Other	126
11.5	Norfolk: Duplicates	(4) (Note: The following historic resources within Norfolk County are included on multiple area lists: Blue Hills Reservation Parkways-Metropolitan Park System of Greater Boston (Milton, Quincy, and other Norfolk County); Brookwood Farm (Milton and other Norfolk County); Massachusetts Hornfels-Braintree Slate Quarry (Milton and Quincy))
11.6	Norfolk: Total	360
12	Plymouth	147
13.1	Suffolk: Northern Boston	148
13.2	Suffolk: Southern Boston	187
13.3	Suffolk: Other	23
13.4	Suffolk: Duplicates	(2) (Note: The following historic resources within Boston are included both of the northern Boston and southern Boston multiple area lists: 1767 Milestones; Olmsted Park System)
13.5	Suffolk: Total	356
14.1	Worcester: Southbridge	85
14.2	Worcester: Uxbridge	53
14.3	Worcester: Eastern Worcester city	98
14.4	Worcester: Northwestern Worcester city	112
14.5	Worcester: Southwestern Worcester city	82
14.6	Worcester: Northern Worcester County	82
14.7	Worcester: Other	186
14.8	Worcester: Duplicates	(6) (Note: The following historic resources within Worcester County are included on multiple area lists: Blackstone Canal (all three sections of Worcester); Blackstone Canal Historic District (Uxbridge and other Worcester County); 1767 Milestones (other Worcester County, eastern and northwestern Worcester); Eastwood Cemetery (other Worcester County, northern Worcester County))
14.9	Worcester: Total	692
(duplicates):		(47) (Note: The following historic resources are included within multiple county lists: 1767 Milestones (Hampden, Middlesex, Norfolk, Suffolk and Worcester); Larz Anderson Park Historic District (Norfolk and Suffolk); Angle Tree Stone (Bristol and Norfolk); Blue Hills Parkway (Norfolk and Suffolk); Borderland Historic District (Bristol and Norfolk); Boston Harbor Islands Archeological District (Suffolk, Norfolk, and Plymouth); Brandegee Estate (Norfolk and Suffolk); Breakheart Reservation Parkways-Metropolitan Park System of Greater Boston (Essex and Middlesex); Cedar Swamp Archeological District (Middlesex and Worcester); Charles River Basin Historic District (Middlesex and Suffolk); Charles River Reservation Parkways (Middlesex and Suffolk); Chestnut Hill Historic District (Middlesex and Norfolk); Chestnut Hill Reservoir Historic District (Middlesex and Suffolk); Dorchester-Milton Lower Mills Industrial District (Norfolk and Suffolk); D.W. Field Park (Norfolk and Plymouth); Echo Bridge (Middlesex and Norfolk); Fairview Cemetery (Suffolk and Norfolk); Fort Devens Historic District (Middlesex and Worcester); Hammond Pond Parkway (Middlesex and Norfolk); John Harris House and Farm (Allandale Farm) (Norfolk and Suffolk); Lynn Fells Parkway (Middlesex and Essex); Marlborough Brook Filter Beds (Middlesex and Worcester); Middlefield-Becket Stone Arch Railroad Bridge District (Berkshire, Hampden and Hampshire); Middlesex Canal Historic and Archaeological District (Middlesex and Suffolk); Mohawk Trail (Berkshire and Franklin); Needham Street Bridge (Middlesex and Norfolk); Neponset Valley Parkway, Metropolitan Park System of Greater Boston (Norfolk and Suffolk), Olmsted Park System (Norfolk and Suffolk); Paul's Bridge (Norfolk and Suffolk); Revere Beach Parkway-Metropolitan Park System of Greater Boston (Middlesex and Suffolk); Shirley Shaker Village (Middlesex and Worcester); Stony Brook Reservation Parkways (Norfolk and Suffolk); Sudbury Aqueduct Linear District (Middlesex and Norfolk); Sudbury Dam Historic District (Middlesex and Worcester); Truman Parkway-Metropolitan Park System of Greater Boston (Norfolk and Suffolk); VFW Parkway (Norfolk and Suffolk); Wachusett Aqueduct Linear District (Middlesex and Worcester); Ware-Hardwick Covered Bridge (Hampshire and Worcester); Weston Aqueduct Linear District (Middlesex and Worcester); West Roxbury Parkway, Metropolitan Park System of Greater Boston (Norfolk and Suffolk); Western Railroad Stone Arch Bridges and Chester Factory Village Depot (Berkshire, Hampden and Hampshire))
Total:		4,452

== See also ==
- List of bridges on the National Register of Historic Places in Massachusetts
- List of historical societies in Massachusetts
- List of National Historic Landmarks in Massachusetts
