= Town Line Boundary Marker =

Town Line Boundary Marker may refer to:

- Town Line Boundary Marker (410 High Street, Barnstable, Massachusetts), listed on the National Register of Historic Places in Barnstable County, Massachusetts
- Town Line Boundary Marker (Great Hill Road, Barnstable, Massachusetts), listed on the National Register of Historic Places in Barnstable County, Massachusetts
