= Sudbury Reservoir =

Reservoir in Massachusetts

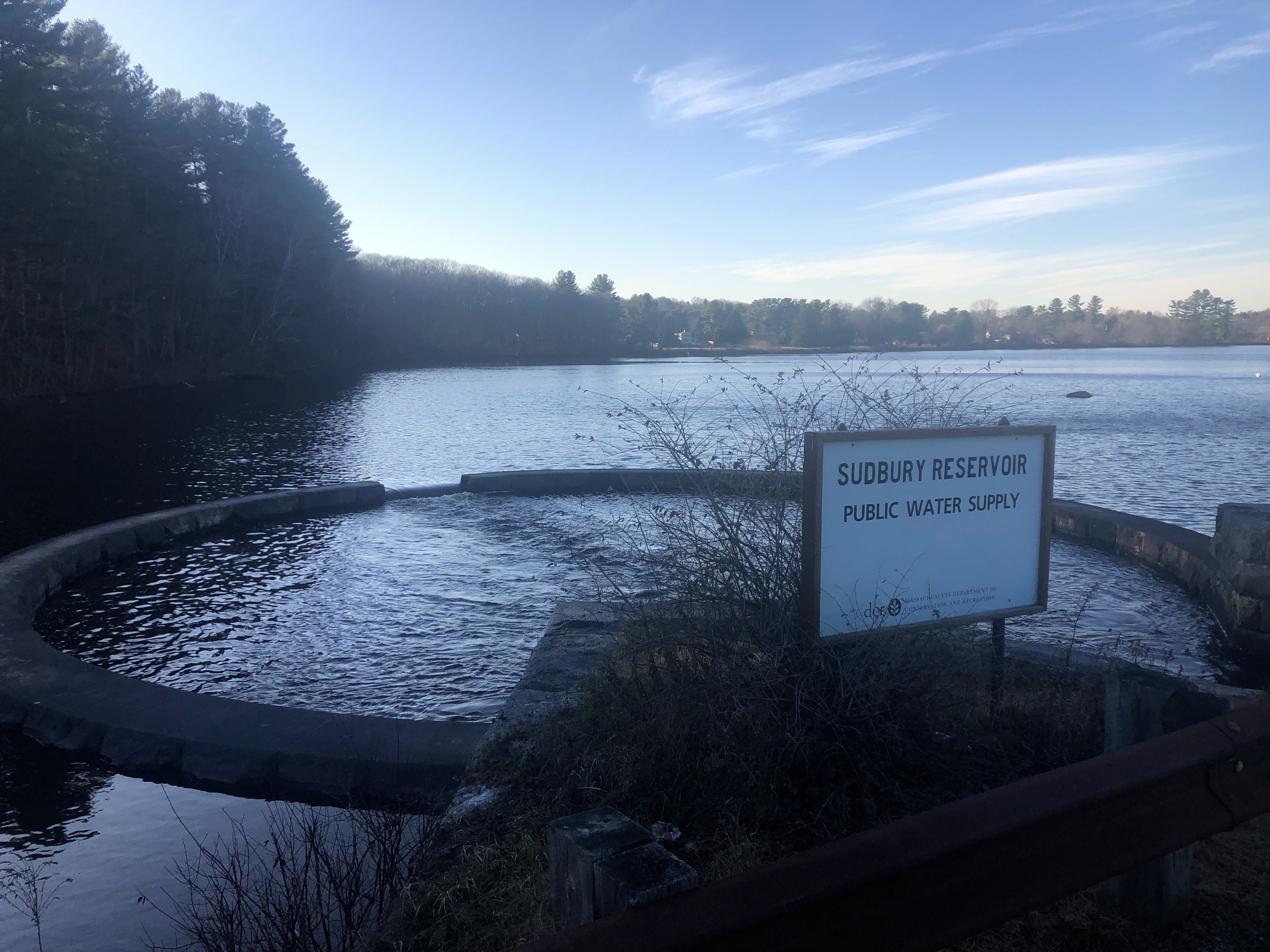
- A section of the reservoir as seen from Middle Road in Southborough

- Location in Massachusetts Sudbury Reservoir (the United States)
- Location: Middlesex County and Worcester County, Massachusetts, United States
- Coordinates: 42°19′21″N 71°30′45″W
- Type: Reservoir
- Primary inflows: Wachusett Aqueduct
- Primary outflows: Weston Aqueduct
- Basin countries: United States
- Max. length: 3.35 mi (5.39 km)
- Max. width: 1.4 mi (2.3 km)
- Surface area: 2.02 sq mi (5.2 km^{2})
- Average depth: 17 ft (5.2 m)
- Max. depth: 65 ft (20 m)
- Water volume: 7.253 billion US gallons (27.46 billion litres)
- Surface elevation: 249 ft (76 m)
- Settlements: Southborough, Fayetteville
- Website: Sudbury Reservoir

The Sudbury Reservoir (2.02 square miles) is an emergency backup Boston metropolitan water reservoir in Massachusetts, located predominantly in Southborough and Marlborough. It was created when the Sudbury Dam was constructed to impound the Stony Brook branch of the Sudbury River; no part of the reservoir lies in the town of Sudbury. Nearly 5,000 acres (2,000 ha) in the Sudbury Reservoir watershed are administered by the Massachusetts Department of Conservation and Recreation as a limited-access public recreation area.

== History ==
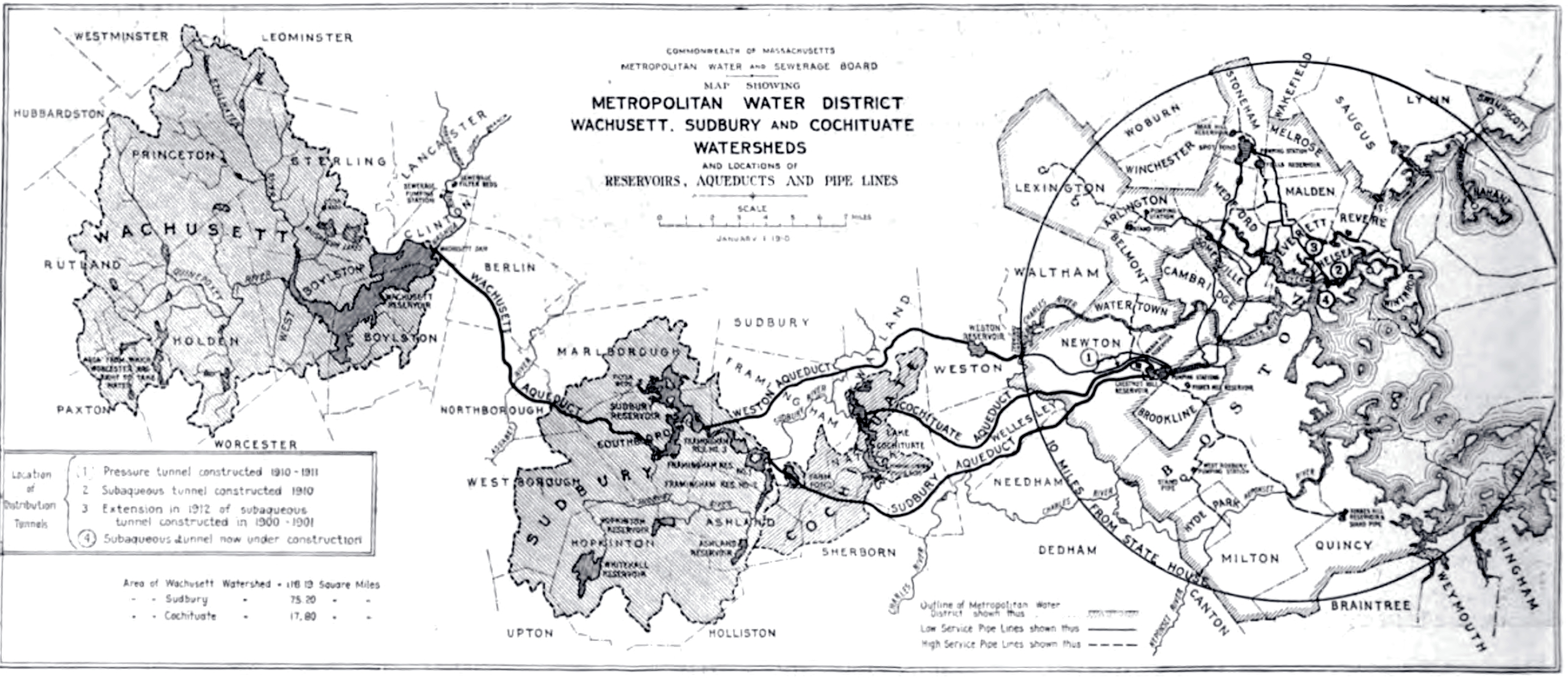
Metropolitan Water District system, 1910

The reservoir was first begun in 1878, as part of a system of reservoirs fed from the Sudbury River to supplement the Lake Cochituate system in Natick. Today's reservoir was created by excavation from 1894 to 1898, with construction undertaken in sections. It was begun by the City of Boston but completed by the newly formed Metropolitan Water Board (predecessor to the modern Massachusetts Water Resources Authority). All told, construction required moving about 4.5 million cubic yards (3.4 million cubic metres) of soil and boulders. Water began to fill the reservoir on February 8, 1897, with construction of the reservoir's new Sudbury Dam on the Stony Brook Branch of the Sudbury River completed later that year.

When completed, the reservoir's surface area was 2.02 square miles (5.2 km^{2}), its average depth was 17 feet (5.2 m) and maximum depth was 65 feet (20 m), and its capacity was 7.253 billion US gallons (27.46 billion litres). The reservoir was fed from the Wachusett Reservoir on the west by the Wachusett Aqueduct (1898), and by local streams. To improve the water quality of the local streams, the Marlborough Brook filter beds were constructed adjacent to the reservoir. The reservoir's water was delivered to the Weston Reservoir to the east by the Weston Aqueduct (1901), or via a channel to the Framingham reservoirs and the Sudbury Aqueduct to the Chestnut Hill Reservoir.

In 1947, the obsolete Whitehall, Hopkinton, Ashland and Cochituate reservoirs became state parks; and in 1976, the entire Sudbury System was officially reclassified as an emergency water supply. Today only the Sudbury Reservoir and the Foss Reservoir (Framingham Reservoir No. 3) remain as reserve drinking water supplies with the Weston and Sudbury aqueducts serving as reserve transmission. In an emergency the Sudbury and Foss reservoirs can be placed into service either as a primary source, as an alternate pass-through for Quabbin/Wachusett reservoir water in the event of a transmission problem blocking the normal transmission pathways, or as a supplemental source in a major drought. In all cases, the water would be untreated and would likely require boiling for consumption.

== Permitted activities ==
The area's limited public access allows for picnicking, hiking, snowshoeing, cross-country skiing, and shoreline fishing with restrictions.

== Additional sources ==
- Science and Industry, Volume 6, The Colliery Engineer Company, Scranton, Penn: International Textbook Company, February–December 1901.
