= Brandegee =

Brandegee is a surname. Notable people with the surname include:

- Augustus Brandegee (1828–1904), American lawyer and politician
- Frank B. Brandegee (1864–1924), American politician
- Mary Katharine Brandegee (1844–1920), American botanist
- Townshend Stith Brandegee (1843–1925), American botanist

== See also ==
- Brandegee Estate, a historic estate in Massachusetts
