= Toss Kelly =

American baseball umpire (1862-1924)

- Born: Thomas B. Kelly; May 6, 1862; Hopkinton, Massachusetts, U.S.
- Died: November 2, 1924 (aged 62); Brockton, Massachusetts, U.S.
- Resting place: Hopkinton, Massachusetts
- Occupation: Major League Baseball umpire
- Years active: 1905

Thomas B. "Toss" Kelly (May 6, 1862 – November 2, 1924) was an American professional baseball umpire.

Kelly, born in Massachusetts in 1862, was a long-time umpire in the minor leagues, including twelve years in the Eastern League (which later became the International League).

In 1905, Kelly was signed as an American League umpire by Ban Johnson. Kelly made his major league debut on April 15, and worked a total of 67 games (49 as the home plate umpire) through July 11. He issued 8 ejections during that time, including outfielder Jim Jackson of the Cleveland Naps twice.

In a 1912 newspaper article, Kelly recounted a difficult call he had made in 1895. With two outs in the ninth inning and the home team down a run and batting, baserunner Jack Glasscock attempted to steal second base. Seeing that he would be an easy out, Glasscock threw some infield dirt at the second baseman, preventing him from catching the ball. Kelly called Glasscock out for interference, angering spectators who then rushed the field – Kelly was saved from physical harm by Glasscock, who told the crowd that the umpires's call was correct.

Kelly died in Brockton, Massachusetts, in 1924 at age 62.

== See also ==
- List of Major League Baseball umpires (disambiguation)
