= Margaret Neary School =

Coordinates: 42°17′44.77″N 71°32′21.25″W

Margaret A. Neary Elementary School
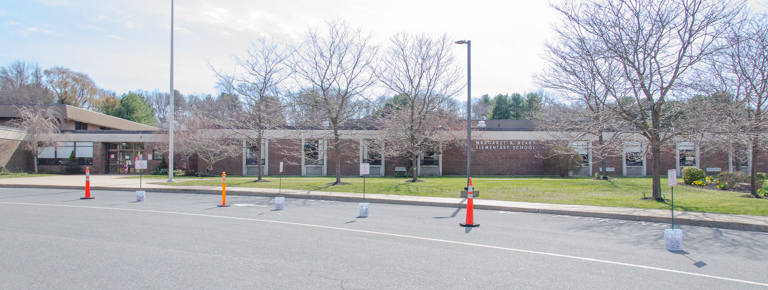
- Margaret A Neary School

Location
- 53 Parkerville Rd. Southborough, Massachusetts 01772

Information
- Type: Public elementary school
- Established: 1970
- School district: Northborough-Southborough Regional School Committee
- Superintendent: Gregory Martineau
- Principal: Kathleen A. Valenti
- Grades: 4th-5th Grade
- Enrollment: 282 (2023-2024)
- Average class size: 20 students
- Student to teacher ratio: 20:1
- Hours in school day: 6
- Communities served: Southborough, Massachusetts, U.S.
- Website: neary.nsboro.k12.ma.us

Margaret A. Neary Elementary School is a public school in Southborough, Massachusetts, U.S. In the 2022-2023 academic year, it serves 263 students in grades 4 and 5. It serves 4th and 5th graders in Southborough and is in the Northborough-Southborough Regional School District. Generally, students who complete this school go to nearby Trottier Middle School.

== Standardized Test Scores ==
Students of the school take the Massachusetts Comprehensive Assessment System (MCAS). The 4th graders take a mathematics, and English language arts, while the 5th graders take the mathematics, science and technology/engineering, and English language arts tests. The average test score for all of the students is generally higher than that of the entire state and, for all tests in the past few years, is at least 12% higher than the state. In 2019, Neary was recognized by the Massachusetts Department of Education's Accountability System as a "School of Recognition" for exceeding targets.

== Bands ==
The school has optional performing arts groups, including a band, an orchestra and a chorus.
