= Marlborough Brook Filter Beds =

- U.S. National Register of Historic Places
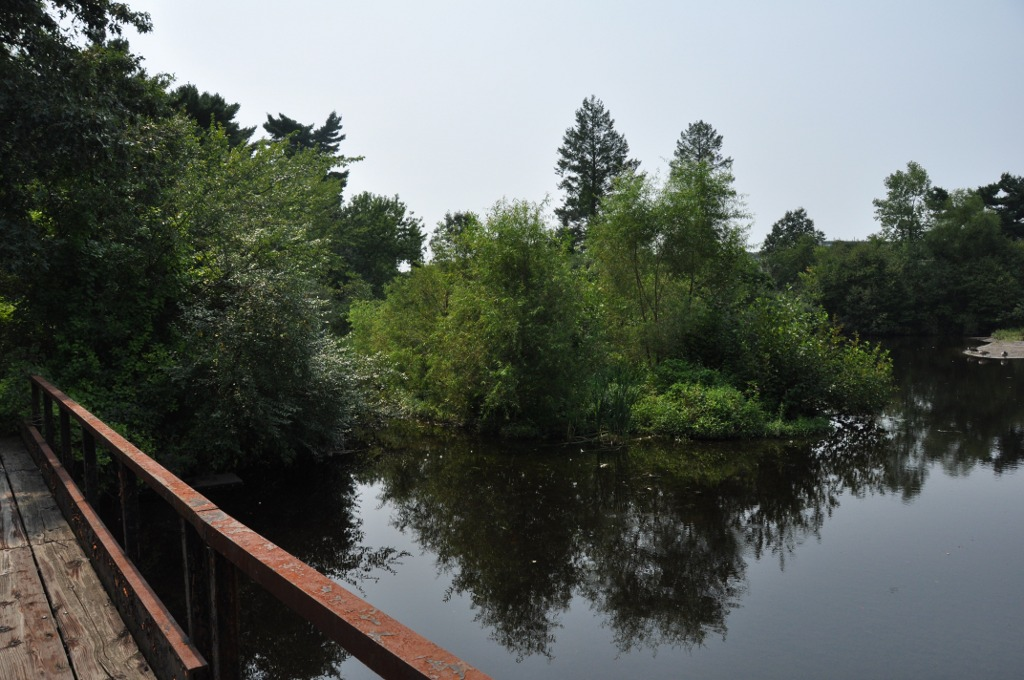
- A pond and bridge over a spillway in the filter bed area

- Location within Massachusetts Location within the United States
- Location: Marlborough and Southborough, Massachusetts
- Coordinates: 42°19′47″N 71°32′9″W
- Area: 16 acres (6.5 ha)
- Built: 1895
- Architect: Frederick P. Stearns
- MPS: Water Supply System of Metropolitan Boston MPS
- NRHP reference No.: 89002286
- Added to NRHP: January 18, 1990

The Marlborough Brook Filter Beds are a series of water filtration beds near the mouth of Marlborough Brook, where it enters Sudbury Reservoir near the town line between Marlborough and Southborough, Massachusetts. The filter beds were constructed in 1895 as part of the reservoir construction to improve the water quality of Marlborough and Walker Brooks, and are the best-preserved of two such facilities built as part of the public water supply serving Boston and surrounding communities. The site was listed on the National Register of Historic Places in 1990.

== Description and history ==
The filter beds are located on 16 acres (6.5 ha) straddling the border between Marlborough and Southborough on the west side of the Sudbury Reservoir, and are now largely overgrown with vegetation. They are roughly bounded by three roadways: Walker Street to the north, Massachusetts Route 85 to the west (which is Maple Street in Marlborough and Marlboro Street in Southborough), and Acre Bridge Road in Southborough, which becomes Framingham Road in Marlborough. The northernmost portion, where Marlborough Brook enters after crossing under Walker Street, is a 1.5-acre (0.61 ha) settling reservoir. From this, water was diverted over a stone and concrete weir into a channel running along the eastern edge of the beds. Sluiceways controlled the channeling of water into a series of 17 beds to the west, which consist of shallow basins with about 2 feet (0.61 m) of sand set at the bottom on top of a tile bed. The water would filter through these beds by gravity. Further down the main channel another sluiceway channeled water into a larger holding bed, or into a second series of 10 "natural" beds, which fashioned out of already-extant gravel.

When The Sudbury Reservoir was built in 1893-95, it was predominantly fed by the Sudbury River, but also received water from a number of smaller surrounding streams. Marlborough and Walker Brooks were two of these, and were identified from an early date as having substandard water quality. The engineering staff of the Metropolitan Water Board, predecessor to today's Massachusetts Water Resources Authority (MWRA), designed these structures in order to improve the quality of the water entering the reservoir from these two streams, and were completed by 1899. Only one other location in the Boston water supply had similar structures, which were later storm-damaged and partially filled in. These filter beds are no longer in service, and the Sudbury Reservoir is part of the MWRA's backup facilities.

== See also ==
- National Register of Historic Places listings in Worcester County, Massachusetts
- National Register of Historic Places listings in Marlborough, Massachusetts
