= Waldo Irving Burnett =

American zoologist and histologist (1828–1854)

- Born: July 12, 1828; Southborough, Massachusetts, US
- Died: July 1, 1854 (aged 25); Boston, Massachusetts, US
- Education: Harvard Medical School (PhD)

Waldo Irving Burnett (1828–1854) was an American zoologist and histologist.

== Early life and education ==
Burnett was born in Southborough, Massachusetts to physician Joel Burnett. From the age of 16, he often accompanied and assisted his father during patient visits at the Massachusetts General Hospital. After his fathers death in 1845, he began a teaching career to support himself, concurrently studying medicine under Joseph Sargent.

Despite lacking a doctorate, Burnett had a significant enough reputation to be listed as a member of the American Association for the Advancement of Science in 1848. Burnett eventually graduated from the Harvard Medical School in 1849 and went overseas to Europe for four months but was diagnosed with tuberculosis in Paris. He returned to recover and take an academic position as the secretary of the Department of Zoology.

== Career ==
Despite suffering from illness much into his later life, Burnett published more than 60 scientific articles over the course of his five-year academic career, with notable contributions to the field of histology.

He was inducted as a member of the American Academy of Arts and Sciences in 1853.

== Death ==
Burnett died from tuberculosis on July 1, 1854, at 25.
