= Cordaville, Massachusetts =

- Census-designated place
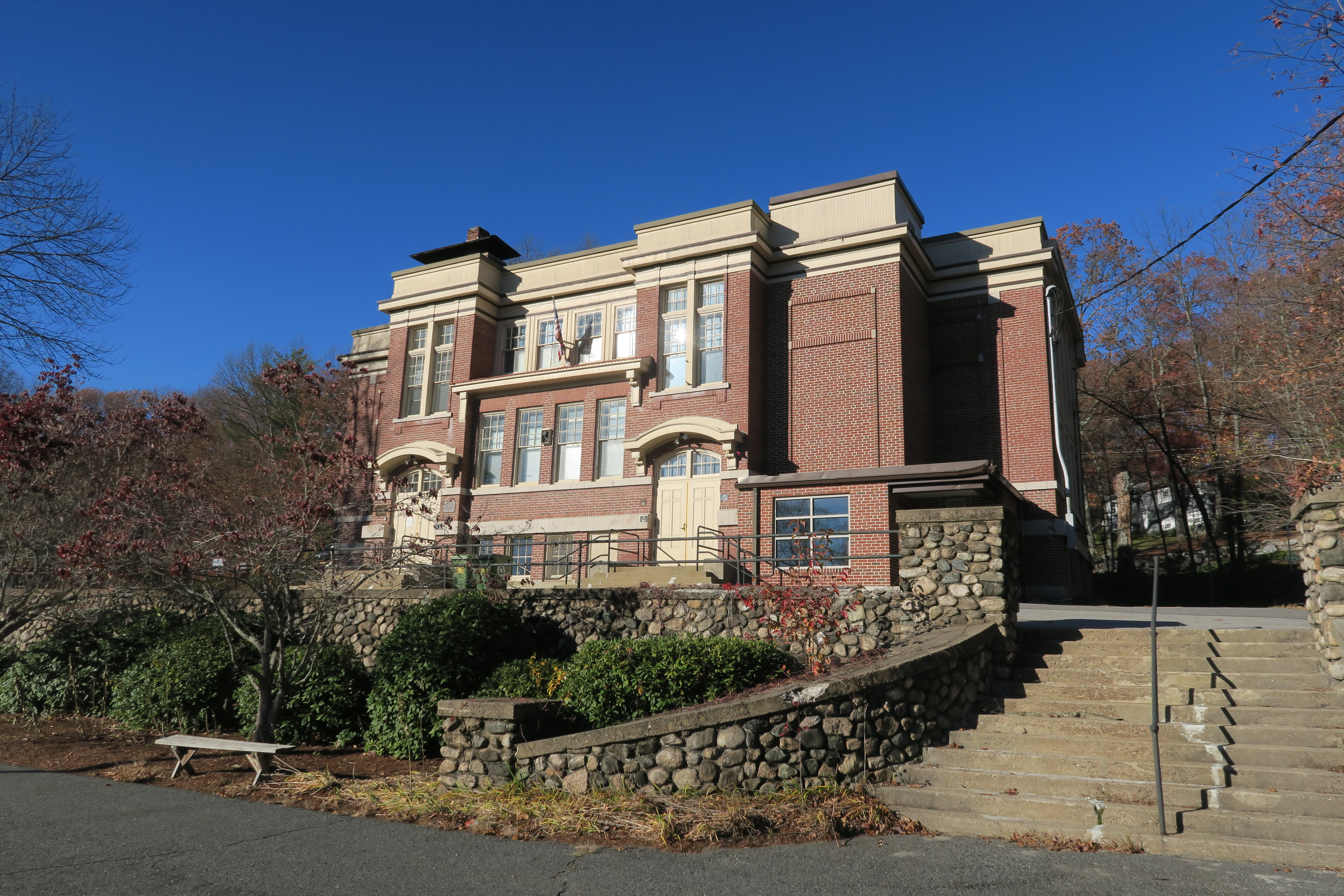
- South Union School

- Location in Worcester County and the state of Massachusetts.
- Coordinates: 42°16′12″N 71°31′37″W
- Country: United States
- State: Massachusetts
- County: Worcester

Area
  - Total: 1.82 sq mi (4.71 km^{2})
  - Land: 1.81 sq mi (4.70 km^{2})
  - Water: 0.0039 sq mi (0.01 km^{2})
- Elevation: 249 ft (76 m)

Population (2020)
  - Total: 2,703
  - Density: 1,488.6/sq mi (574.76/km^{2})
- Time zone: UTC-5 (Eastern (EST))
  - Summer (DST): UTC-4 (EDT)
- ZIP Code: 01772 (Southborough)
- FIPS code: 25-15340
- GNIS feature ID: 0611322

Cordaville is a census-designated place (CDP) in the town of Southborough in Worcester County, Massachusetts, United States. As of the 2020 census, Cordaville had a population of 2,703.

== Geography ==
Cordaville is located at 42°16′12″N 71°31′37″W (42.269947, -71.526869).

According to the United States Census Bureau, the CDP has a total area of 4.8 km^{2} (1.9 mi^{2}), all land.

== Demographics ==
Historical population
Census	Pop.	Note	%±
2020	2,703		—
U.S. Decennial Census

=== 2020 census ===
As of the 2020 census, Cordaville had a population of 2,703. The median age was 41.8 years. 23.8% of residents were under the age of 18 and 12.5% of residents were 65 years of age or older. For every 100 females there were 101.9 males, and for every 100 females age 18 and over there were 102.7 males age 18 and over.

100.0% of residents lived in urban areas, while 0.0% lived in rural areas.

There were 897 households in Cordaville, of which 45.5% had children under the age of 18 living in them. Of all households, 73.5% were married-couple households, 7.8% were households with a male householder and no spouse or partner present, and 13.6% were households with a female householder and no spouse or partner present. About 12.1% of all households were made up of individuals and 7.8% had someone living alone who was 65 years of age or older.

There were 917 housing units, of which 2.2% were vacant. The homeowner vacancy rate was 0.6% and the rental vacancy rate was 0.0%.

Racial composition as of the 2020 census
Race	Number	Percent
White	2,037	75.4%
Black or African American	34	1.3%
American Indian and Alaska Native	1	0.0%
Asian	427	15.8%
Native Hawaiian and Other Pacific Islander	1	0.0%
Some other race	49	1.8%
Two or more races	154	5.7%
Hispanic or Latino (of any race)	89	3.3%

=== 2010 census ===
At the 2010 census there were 2,650 people, 870 households, and 741 families living in the CDP. The population density was 524.9/km^{2} (1,360.6/mi^{2}). There were 889 housing units at an average density of 171.1/km^{2} (443.6/mi^{2}). The racial makeup of the CDP was 87.3% White, 0.71% African American, 9.39% Asian, 0.0% Pacific Islander, 0.8% from other races, and 1.8% from two or more races. Hispanic or Latino of any race were 2.5%.

Of the 870 households 45.9% had children under the age of 18 living with them, 74.7% were married couples living together, 8.0% had a female householder with no husband present, and 14.8% were non-families. 12.1% of households were one person and 3.7% were one person aged 65 or older. The average household size was 3.04 and the average family size was 3.33.

The age distribution was 32.4% under the age of 18, and the median age was 41 years. For every 100 females, there were 101.3 males.

=== Income and poverty ===
The median household income in the CDP, in 2012 inflation-adjusted dollars, was $149,425, and the median family income was $157,097. None of the families and 0.4% of the population were living below the poverty line, including no under eighteens and none of those over 64.
