= Susannah V. Aldrich =

American author and hymnwriter

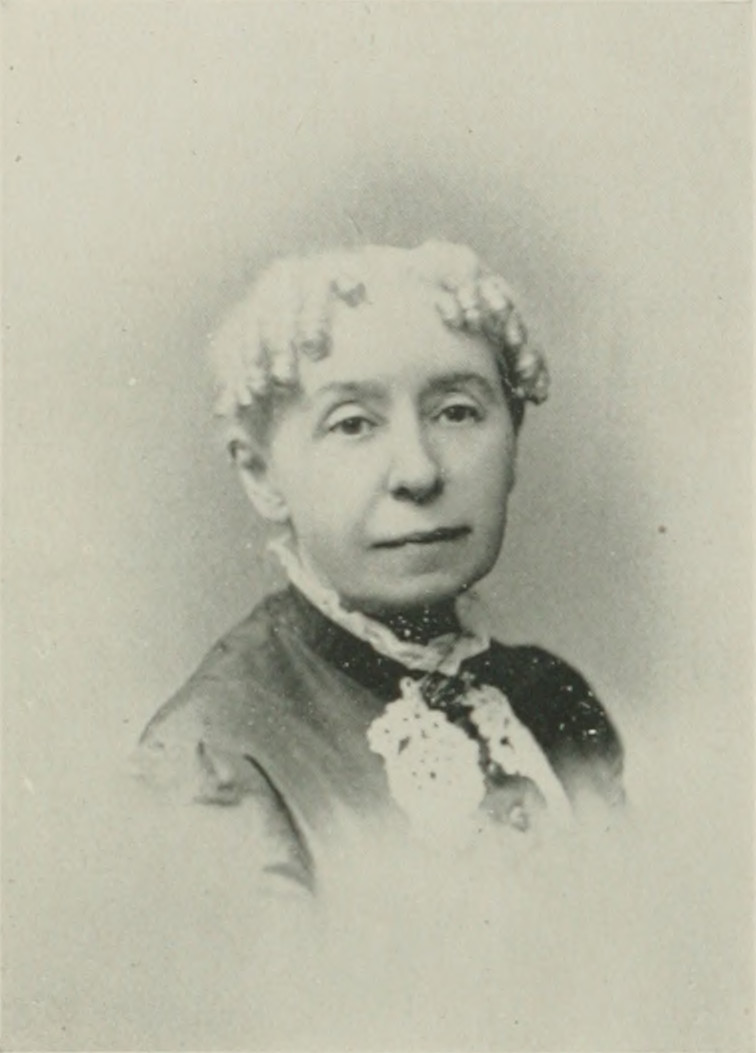
- Photo in A Woman of the Century
- Born: Susannah Valentine Aldrich; November 14, 1828; Hopkinton, Massachusetts, U.S.
- Died: November 30, 1905 (aged 77); Boston, Massachusetts, U.S.
- Resting place: Mount Auburn Cemetery, Hopkinton, Massachusetts
- Occupations: author, hymnwriter
- Writing career
- Language: English

Susannah V. Aldrich (November 14, 1828 – November 30, 1905) was a 19th-century American author and hymnwriter from Massachusetts. She began writing in her school days and, despite a severe illness that interrupted her studies, she contributed prose and poetry to a number of papers and magazines. A prolific writer who would jot down ideas during periods of insomnia, she later confined her literary work to writing for special occasions.

== Biography ==
Susannah (or Susanna) Valentine Aldrich was born in Hopkinton, Massachusetts, on November 14, 1828. She was the only child of Willard and Lucy (Morse) Aldrich.

As a child, she showed fondness for writing her thoughts. In her schooldays, she found it far easier to write compositions than to commit lessons to memory, and she was generally permitted to choose her own subjects for the regular "composition day" in school. Her studies were interrupted by a severe illness which lasted for several years.

The Rev. John Calvin Webster was her pastor, and also one of the directors of the academy which Aldrich attended. Struck with the quality of her compositions, he selected some of them to offer to a magazine for publication. These were accepted. For many years, Aldrich contributed prose and poetry to a number of papers and magazines. She was a victim to insomnia, and she always kept paper and pencil within reach in order to jot down her ideas during periods of wakefulness. After her health became impaired, she confined her literary work to various occasions.

From 1879, she made her home in the Roxbury District of Boston. She died in Boston, November 30, 1905, and is buried at Mount Auburn Cemetery.

== Selected works ==
=== Hymns ===
- Original hymn, between 1850 and 1865
- Anniversary Hymn
- At the Mercy Seat
- Buried with Thee
- Come and Help Us
- Dedication of a Church
- Drawing Nearer
- Easter Hymn
- Faith
- Give Me That Heart of Flesh
- He Is Risen
- He Leadeth
- How Fair upon the Mountains
- In the Battle
- Light of the World
- Messenger, The
- Missionary Hymn
- I may hear His voice at morning
