= Hopkinton, Massachusetts =

- Town
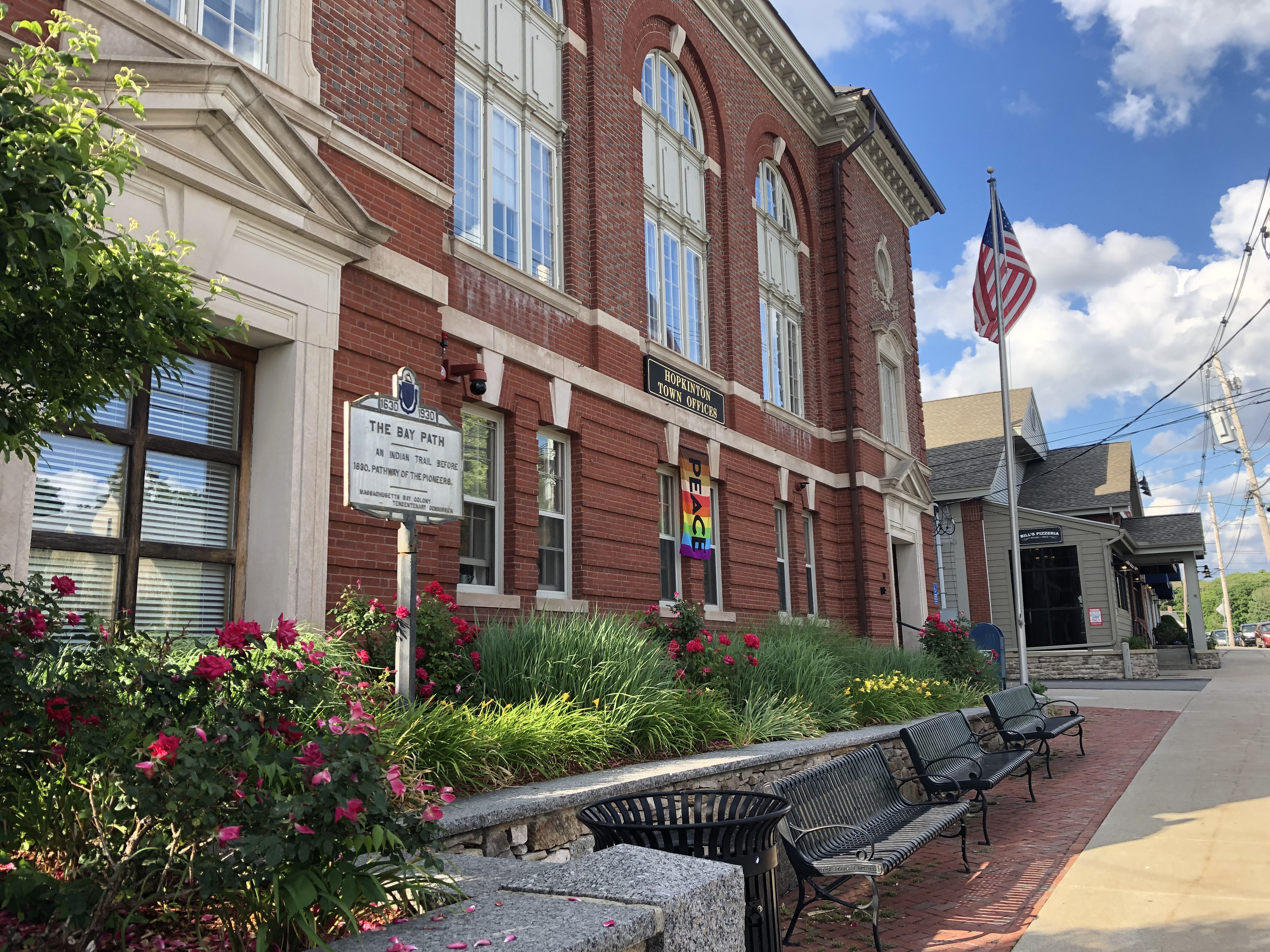
- Town Hall

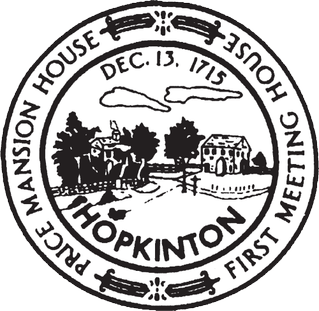
- Seal

- Location in Middlesex County in Massachusetts
- Coordinates: 42°13′43″N 71°31′23″W
- Country: United States
- State: Massachusetts
- County: Middlesex
- Settled and Incorporated: 1715

Government
  - Type: Open town meeting
  - Town Manager: Elaine Lazarus
  - Select Board: Members 2026-27: Shahidul Mannan, Chair; Matthew Kizner, Vice Chair; Brian Herr; Amy Ritterbusch; Joseph Clark

Area
  - Total: 28.1 sq mi (72.9 km^{2})
  - Land: 26.6 sq mi (68.8 km^{2})
  - Water: 1.6 sq mi (4.2 km^{2})
- Elevation: 410 ft (125 m)

Population (2020)
  - Total: 18,758
  - Density: 706/sq mi (273/km^{2})
- Time zone: UTC-5 (Eastern)
  - Summer (DST): UTC-4 (Eastern)
- ZIP Codes: 01748 (Hopkinton); 01784 (Woodville P.O. boxes)
- Area code: 508 / 774
- FIPS code: 25-31085
- GNIS feature ID: 0619400
- Website: www.hopkintonma.gov

Hopkinton is a town in Middlesex County, Massachusetts, United States, 25 miles (40 km) west of Boston. The town is notable as the starting point of the Boston Marathon, held annually on Patriots' Day each April, and as the headquarters for the Dell EMC corporation. As of the 2020 census, the town had a population of 18,758, a population growth rate faster than any other municipality in the commonwealth.

The U.S. Census recognizes the central village within the town as a census-designated place, with a population of 2,651 at the 2020 census. Hopkinton also includes the village of Woodville, which was established as a historic district in 2005.

== History ==
The Town of Hopkinton was incorporated on December 13, 1715. Hopkinton was named for an early colonist of Connecticut, Edward Hopkins, who left a large sum of money to be invested in land in New England, the proceeds of which were to be used for the benefit of Harvard University. The trustees of Harvard purchased 12,500 acres of land from the Native American residents with money from the fund and incorporated the area, naming it in honor of its benefactor.

Grain was the first production crop grown in the area, while fruit and dairy industries were developed later. Agriculture predominated until 1840 when the boot and shoe industries were introduced into the town. By 1850 eleven boot and shoe factories were established in Hopkinton. Fires in 1882 and the migration of those industries to other parts of the country eliminated these industries from Hopkinton.

There are 215 Hopkinton properties listed in the State Register of Historic Places. The majority, 187, are located within the Cedar Swamp Archaeological District in Hopkinton and Westborough. The properties are also listed in the National Register of Historic Places.

Twenty-three properties are included within the Hopkinton Center Historic District, a local historic district which comprises properties around the Town Common, on East Main St. and the south side of Main St. The district was expanded in 2000 to include the Town Hall and in 2001 to include Center School. The Hopkinton Supply Company Building on Main St., located slightly west of the district, is listed in the National Register of Historic Places. Former factory worker housing in the center of town, contrasted against the more rural areas surrounding it, are visual reminders of Hopkinton's past.

In 2005, the town established a second historic district in the village of Woodville. The Woodville Historic District Commission was formed the same year. Ninety-seven properties are included within this district. The village of Woodville has retained its distinctive village atmosphere and strong architectural connection to Hopkinton's industrial development and growth from the mid-to-late 19th century. The area was an early cotton clothmaking center and the site of a major shoe factory. When Boston seized Lake Whitehall for its water supply in 1894, the factories along its shores were closed or moved to other sites, as they were considered sources of pollution. Remaining factories and other buildings were destroyed in a fire in 1909. In the 18th century, it was an agricultural area with a few farms scattered north of the much smaller Lake Whitehall and its accompanying cedar swamp, and was the site of a grist mill on Whitehall Brook as early as 1714.

Within or near the Miscoe-Warren-Whitehall Watersheds ACEC (Area of Critical Environmental Concern), remains of large pits have been found. The pits were lined with bark by the Native Americans and used to store corn over the winter months.

At one time, it was believed that the waters flowing from the large swamp south of Pond St., under Pond St. and into Lake Whitehall contained magical healing powers. As a result, the area quickly was built up as a resort area. Visitors came by stagecoach to the Hopkinton Hotel, which was located between Pond St. and the lake. The mineral baths and their powers lured the visitors to the area. The baths can still be viewed by the edge of the stream that drains from the swamp. Within the ACEC area are also two beehive shaped stone structures, about 6 feet (1.8 m) tall. Their origin and use are unknown.

Hopkinton gains national attention once a year in April as it hosts the start of the Boston Marathon, a role the town has enjoyed since 1924. The town takes pride in its hospitality as runners from all over the world gather in Hopkinton to begin the 26.2-mile (42.2 km) run to Boston. It is also a sister city of Marathon, Greece.

== Geography ==
Hopkinton is in the southwestern corner of Middlesex County in eastern Massachusetts, 17 miles (27 km) east of Worcester, 26 miles (42 km) west of Boston, and 195 miles (314 km) from New York City. It is bordered by six towns:

- North = Southborough
- Northeast = Ashland
- Southeast = Holliston
- South = Milford
- Southwest = Upton
- Northwest = Westborough

All but Ashland and Holliston are in neighboring Worcester County.

Hopkinton village is in the center of town, at the intersection of Main Street (Massachusetts Route 135) with Cedar Street/Grove Street (Massachusetts Route 85). The neighborhood of Woodville is in the western part of the town, along Route 135 at the north end of Whitehall Reservoir. Hopkinton State Park is in the northern part of the town, extending northeast into Ashland.

According to the United States Census Bureau, the town has a total area of 27.9 square miles (72.3 km^{2}), of which 26.2 square miles (67.9 km^{2}) are land and 1.6 square miles (4.1 km^{2}), or 5.85%, are water. Besides Whitehall Reservoir, notable water bodies include Hopkinton Reservoir in the north, in Hopkinton State Park, and North Pond and Echo Lake in the south. Whitehall Reservoir and Hopkinton Reservoir drain north to the Sudbury River, part of the Concord River watershed leading to the Merrimack River. North Pond, in the southwestern part of town, forms the headwaters of the Mill River, which flows south to join the Blackstone River in Rhode Island. Echo Lake, in the southeastern part of town, is at the headwaters of the Charles River, which flows east to Boston Harbor.

== Climate ==
The climate in Hopkinton tends to be hot and humid during the summer, with daily high temperatures averaging in the 80s. Temperatures in the 90s are also known to occur between June and August as high-pressure air masses push in from the south. Winters are typical of areas inland and west of Boston. Snowfall averages around 45" but can vary tremendously from season to season.

The warmest month of the year is July, with an average minimum and maximum temperature of 65 °F (18 °C) and 84 °F (29 °C) respectively. The coldest month of the year is January, with an average minimum and maximum temperature of 20 and 40 °F (−7 and 4 °C) respectively.

Diurnal temperature variations tend to be fairly limited during summer, with a difference that can reach 18 °F (10 °C), and fairly limited during winter with an average difference of 16 °F (8.9 °C).

The annual average precipitation at Hopkinton is 51.25 inches (1,302 mm). Rainfall is fairly evenly distributed throughout the year. The wettest month of the year is November, with an average rainfall of 4.69 inches (119 mm).

Normal temperature in January (max/min average)	25.5 °F (−3.6 °C)
Normal temperature in July (max/min average)	74.5 °F (23.6 °C)
Normal annual precipitation	44.9 inches (1,140 mm)

== Demographics ==
Historical population
Year	Pop.	±%
1790	1,317	—
1850	2,801	+112.7%
1860	4,340	+54.9%
1870	4,419	+1.8%
1880	4,601	+4.1%
1890	4,088	−11.1%
1900	2,623	−35.8%
1910	2,452	−6.5%
1920	2,289	−6.6%
1930	2,563	+12.0%
1940	2,697	+5.2%
1950	3,486	+29.3%
1960	4,932	+41.5%
1970	5,981	+21.3%
1980	7,114	+18.9%
1990	9,191	+29.2%
2000	13,346	+45.2%
2010	14,925	+11.8%
2020	18,758	+25.7%
2024*	19,971	+6.5%
* = population estimate. Source: United States census records and Population Estimates Program data.

According to an estimate by the UMass Donahue Institute, between the 2010 census and 2020 census, Hopkinton was the fastest-growing community in Greater Boston.

As of the census of 2010, there were 14,925 people, 4,957 households, and 3,978 families residing in the town. The population density was 568.4 inhabitants per square mile (219.5/km^{2}). There were 5,128 housing units at an average density of 195.3 per square mile (75.4/km^{2}). The racial makeup of the town was 93.1% White, 0.8% Black or African American, 0.1% Native American, 4.4% Asian, 0.4% from other races, and 1.2% from two or more races. Hispanic or Latino of any race were 1.8% of the population.

There were 4,957 households, out of which 48.1% had children under the age of 18 living with them, 70.5% were married couples living together, 6.9% had a female householder with no husband present, and 19.7% were non-families. 16.0% of all households were made up of individuals, and 5.6% had someone living alone who was 65 years of age or older. The average household size was 2.99 and the average family size was 3.38.

Population was well-distributed by age, with 33.6% under the age of 20, 3.4% from 20 to 24, 22.0% from 25 to 44, 33.0% from 45 to 64, and 7.9% who were 65 years of age or older. The median age was 40.3 years. For every 100 females, there were 96.8 males. For every 100 females age 18 and over, there were 93.4 males.

As of 2000, the median income for a household in the town was $89,281, and the median income for a family was $102,550. Males had a median income of $71,207 versus $42,360 for females. The per capita income for the town was $41,469. About 1.3% of families and 1.7% of the population were below the poverty line, including 1.4% of those under age 18 and 3.4% of those age 65 or over.

== Government ==
Since its incorporation in 1715, Hopkinton has retained its original Open Town Meeting form of government. The town's day-to-day affairs had been directly overseen by an elected Board of Selectmen until 2007, when the Town's Charter Commission created a Town Manager position with more discretion, although the Town Manager still reports to the Board of Selectmen.

=== Annual Town Meeting ===
Hopkinton's Annual Town Meeting begins on the first Saturday in May, hosted at the Hopkinton Middle School or High School. The meeting only begins when a quorum is formed, with 1% of registered Hopkinton voters in attendance. It continues on consecutive evenings, usually three nights in total, until all articles in the Town Meeting Warrant have been voted upon.

==== Warrant ====
The Town Meeting Warrant is a document composed of the articles to be voted upon. Any elected or appointed board, committee, or town officer, or ten petitioning voters, may request that an article be included on the warrant. Each article to be voted upon is directed by the Select Board to an appropriate board or committee to hear and provide the original motion at Town Meeting. All articles which require expending of funds are directed to the Finance Committee; articles dealing with planning and zoning to the Planning Board; articles relating to by-laws to the By-Law Committee, and so forth.

==== Annual Town Election ====
Hopkinton Annual Town Election is held on the third Monday in May. Polls are open 7:00am–8:00pm. All Hopkinton precincts vote at the Hopkinton Middle School.

=== County government ===
Massachusetts has 14 counties which were regional administrative districts before the Revolutionary War. In 1997, the county governments of Middlesex, Berkshire, Essex, Hampden and Worcester were abolished. Many of their functions were turned over to state agencies.

Its county seats are Cambridge and Lowell.

County government: Middlesex County
Clerk of Courts:	Michael A. Sullivan (D)
District Attorney:	Marian T. Ryan (D)
Register of Deeds:	Maria C. Curtatone (D)
Register of Probate:	Tara E. DeCristofaro (D)
County Sheriff:	Peter Koutoujian (D)
State government
State Representative(s):	James Arena-DeRosa (D)
State Senator(s):	Karen E. Spilka (D)
Governor's Councilor(s):	Vacant
Federal government
U.S. Representative(s):	Jim McGovern(D-2nd District)
U.S. Senators:	Elizabeth Warren (D), Ed Markey (D)

== Library ==
The Hopkinton Public Library was founded in 1867. It has been located in the heart of downtown, just steps away from the Town Common, since 1895. Until 1955, bequests were the only source of funding for the library. Since that time, the town government has been appropriating public funds for employee salaries, cost of cleaning the Library, utilities and assistance with the purchase of books. The library is now funded through various sources that include the Town Government, The McGovern Trust Fund, Annual State Aid and Friends of the Library.

The town library was established by the Young Men's Christian Association in 1867. Seven members served as the Trustees, incorporated the Library and adopted by-laws for the government of the Library in 1890. The current building was built in 1895 with contributions from local and former residents of Hopkinton. The second floor was used as a lecture hall and was remodeled later as a children's room. A gallery was built to connect the Library building with the adjacent Episcopal Church after extensive renovation in 1967. This new section was named after the head librarian at the time, Mrs. Betty Strong. A special feature of the reading room is a stained glass window with a motif of water fountain bubbling water flowing over an open book and the inscription on the page reads "The fountain of wisdom flows through books." The large hall clock that still stands near the circulation desk was presented to the Library by Mrs. F.V. Thompson and Mr. Abram Crooks.

The library was transferred to the town government in May 2010. Five members were appointed as the Library Trustees. Starting from May 2011, elections have been held annually for the members of the Library Board according to the new town charter.

In January 2016, the library announced they would make renovations to the building and moved to a temporary location at 65 South Street while the historic building on Main Street undergoes a major renovation and expansion.

In October 2017, the renovated and expanded library reopened in its downtown location at 13 Main Street.

== Education ==
=== Public schools ===
The Town of Hopkinton has a public school system which serves students from pre-kindergarten through twelfth grade. Kindergarten students and first-graders attend Marathon Elementary School. Grades 2 and 3 attend Elmwood School. Grades 4 and 5 attend Hopkins School. Grades 6 through 8 attend Hopkinton Middle School. Grades 9 through 12 attend Hopkinton High School. The town also has an integrated preschool currently located in the Marathon Elementary School building.

Hopkinton offered a fee-based full-day kindergarten option for the first time during the 2010–2011 school year via a lottery system. Free full-day Kindergarten was made available to all Kindergarten students starting in the 2014–2015 school year. Hopkinton Public Schools does not offer any foreign language education before Grade 7.

Since residents approved the Center School Feasibility Study in May 2008, Hopkinton had been involved in an Elementary School Building Project with the Massachusetts School Building Authority. The solution approved unanimously by the Hopkinton Elementary School Building Committee and the MSBA was to build a new K–5 Elementary School on the town-owned Fruit Street property and then decommission the aging Center School. Residents voted down the new school at the March 21, 2011, Special Town Meeting and again at a Special Town Election on March 28, 2011.

In May 2013 voters approved funding a new Center School Feasibility Study. The solution proposed by the new Elementary School Building Committee was to build a new Preschool, Kindergarten and Grade 1 School at 135 Hayden Rowe Street (Route 85), on property newly purchased by the town for this purpose. This proposal was approved by voters at a November 2015 Special Town Meeting. The new Marathon Elementary School, named after a public town survey, is located on Route 85 in Hopkinton, and opened for the fall 2018 school year.

Hopkinton High's school mascot is the Hiller "H", as the sports teams are known as the Hopkinton Hillers. Previously the teams were known as the Hopkinton Stonethrowers. The school primary colors are green and white, with orange as a secondary color.

== Economy and business ==
Hopkinton is the corporate headquarters of Dell EMC, a global manufacturer of software and systems for information management and storage. Dell EMC, in addition to providing $1 million in annual real estate tax revenues, is a major contributor to the town's schools and recreational services. On September 7, 2016, Dell and EMC merged, creating Dell EMC.

== Transportation ==
Hopkinton is situated 26 miles (42 km) west of Boston in the MetroWest region of Massachusetts. Interstate Route 495 divides the town into east and west zones, which are connected by numerous spokes providing direct access to the airport and other communities in the Greater Boston Metropolitan Area.

=== Major highways ===
Hopkinton is served by two interstate highways and two state highways. Interstates 90 (the Massachusetts Turnpike) and 495, form an interchange on the northern border of Hopkinton and neighboring Westborough. Proximity to Route 9 (The Boston/Worcester Turnpike) and Route 30 in Westborough, gives additional access to east/west destinations.

Principal highways are:

- Interstate 90 (Massachusetts Turnpike) (east/west) (the longest interstate highway in the United States)
- Interstate 495 (north/south)
- State Route 135 (east/west)
- State Route 85 (north/south)

=== Nearby major intersections ===
- Interstate 495 in Westborough, Massachusetts
- Interstate 95 in Weston, Massachusetts

=== Mass transit ===
==== Rail ====
There is no passenger or freight rail service in Hopkinton.

Hopkinton is served by the Southborough MBTA Station, located on the border of Hopkinton and Southborough on Route 85 at Southville Road. MBTA commuter rail service is available to South Station and Back Bay Station, Boston, via the MBTA Framingham-Worcester Commuter Rail Line which connects South Station in Boston and Union Station in Worcester. Travel time to Back Bay is about 50 minutes.

Originally called the Framingham Commuter Rail Line, Framingham was the end of the line until rail traffic was expanded to Worcester in 1996. The line also serves the communities of Newton, Wellesley, Natick, Ashland, Southborough, Westborough and Grafton.

Direct rail service to Boston, to New York, and to many other points on the Amtrak network (National Railroad Passenger Corporation) is available through nearby Framingham.

CSX Transportation provides freight rail service and operates an auto transloading facility in nearby Framingham.

==== Bus ====
- Hopkinton is a Member Community of the MetroWest Regional Transit Authority, which provides local bus service to several towns in the MetroWest area, with service to the MBTA commuter rail station at Framingham.
- Peter Pan Bus Lines provides service to Worcester and Boston from Framingham.

==== Air ====
Boston's Logan International Airport is easily accessible from nearby Framingham. MassPort provides public transportation to all airport terminals from Framingham via the Logan Express bus service seven days per week. The bus terminal and paid parking facility are located on the Shoppers' World Mall property, off the Massachusetts Turnpike Exit 13, between Route 9 and Route 30, at the intersections of East Road and the Burr Street connector.

Worcester Regional Airport, a Primary Commercial (PR) facility with scheduled passenger service, is easily accessible. It has two asphalt runways 5,500 and 6,900 ft (1,700 and 2,100 m) long. Instrument approaches available include precision and non-precision. The airport is served by JetBlue, American Eagle, and Delta.

==== Commuter services ====
Park and ride services:

- MassDOT operates a free park and ride facility at the parking lot at the intersection of Flutie Pass and East Road on the south side of Shoppers' World Mall.
- MassDOT also operates a free park and ride facility at a parking lot adjacent to exit 12 of the Massachusetts Turnpike, across from California Avenue on the west side of Framingham.

== Media ==
=== Newspapers ===
Hopkinton has two local newspapers: The Hopkinton Independent and The Hopkinton Crier, and three online news outlets, HCAM, Hopkinton Patch and HopNews. The town is also served by The Boston Globe, The MetroWest Daily News, and the Telegram & Gazette.

=== Television ===
Hopkinton has a PEG television network known as HCAM, which controls two channels. Many HCAM shows can be viewed directly on their website.

==== HCAM-TV ====
HCAM-TV is the most-received of HCAM's channels, available in every household with cable television in the area. It can be found on Comcast channel 8 and Verizon channel 30. The channel's daily schedule consists mostly of programming aimed at a family audience. Along with series and informative programming, HCAM-TV broadcasts the filming of one-time events (such as performances on the Hopkinton Common and films by the Hopkinton Center for the Arts).

==== HCAM-ED ====
HCAM-ED, sister channel to HCAM-TV, is received by fewer households and has lower programming standards than HCAM-TV. It is found on Comcast channel 96 and Verizon channel 31. The HCAM website also includes news articles and photos, updated daily.

== Points of interest ==
- Hopkinton State Park, located on Route 85 (Cordaville Road), is a Massachusetts state park managed by the Department of Conservation and Recreation, that was created after the Hopkinton Reservoir was removed from service as a water source for the Greater Boston area.
- Whitehall State Park, located on Route 135 (Wood Street), is a Massachusetts state park managed by the Department of Conservation and Recreation. It was created in 1947, when the Whitehall Reservoir was removed from service as a water source for the Greater Boston area.

== Accolades ==
- 2020 – Hopkinton Public Schools was ranked #15 of all 412 public school districts in Massachusetts
- 2014 – Hopkinton made the 'SafeWise 50 Safest Cities in Massachusetts'
- 2013 – National Citizen Survey results conducted by the National Research Center
- 2012 – Hopkinton ranked 4th in the Central MA's Best Communities 2012 round-up
- 2009 – Money magazine ranks Hopkinton 19th best place to live

== Culture ==
- Beginning in 1924, when the Boston Athletic Association chose to move the start line from Ashland, MA, Hopkinton has garnered worldwide attention as the starting point of the annual Boston Marathon.

=== Sister cities ===
- Marathon, Greece

== Places of worship ==
- Community Covenant Church
- Faith Community Church of Hopkinton
- Islamic Masumeen Center
- Korean Presbyterian Church
- The Sanctuary at Woodville (formerly Woodville Baptist Church)
- St John the Evangelist
- St Paul's Episcopal Church
- Vineyard Church of Hopkinton

== Notable people ==
=== Military ===
- Michael Joseph Lenihan (1865–1958), United States Army general during World War I
- Frank Merrill (1903–1955), United States Army general during World War II
- Daniel Shays (1747–1825), soldier, revolutionary and farmer—leader of Shays' Rebellion
  - Daniel Shays Road, a street in Hopkinton off of Saddle Hill Road, is named after him
- Charles F. Walcott (1836–1888), Union Army officer during the American Civil War

=== Politics ===
- Joseph Bowker (1725–1784), first Speaker of the Vermont House of Representatives
- William Chamberlain (1755–1828), United States Representative from Vermont (1803–1805; 1809–1811)
- William Claflin (1818–1905), industrialist, philanthropist, 27th Governor of Massachusetts, United States Representative (1877–1881)
- Paul Danahy (1928–2022), politician and judge in Florida
- John Locke (1764–1855), United States Representative (1804–1805, 1813, 1823)
- Charles Morris (1731–1802), surveyor, judge and political figure in Nova Scotia
- Abbott Barnes Rice (1862–1926), Boston merchant and politician
- William H. Ryan (1860–1939), United States Representative from New York (1899–1909)
- Joseph H. Walker (1829–1907), United States Representative (1889–1899)

=== Religion ===
- Edward L. Hearn (1865–1945), fifth Supreme Knight of the Knights of Columbus
- Levi Richards (1799–1876), religious leader in the Latter Day Saint movement
- Willard Richards (1804–1854), religious leader in the Latter Day Saint movement
- Joseph Young (1797–1881), missionary in the Latter Day Saint movement, brother of Brigham Young

=== Sports ===
- Keegan Bradley (born 1986), professional golfer
- George V. Brown (1880–1937), sports organizer in United States, 30-year starter of Boston marathon, and hockey hall of fame inductee
- Walter A. Brown (1905–1964), founding owner of the Boston Celtics and inductee into the basketball and hockey halls of fame
- Jon Curran (born 1987), professional golfer
- Sean Farrell (born 2001), ice hockey player
- Justin Harney (born 1977), ice hockey player
- Toss Kelly (1862–1924), professional baseball umpire
- Jane Welzel (1955-2014), pioneering long-distance runner
- Josh Sokol (1997-present), Professional Football Player

=== Other ===
- Susannah Valentine Aldrich (1828–1905), author and hymnwriter
- Richard Egan (1936–2009), founder of EMC Corporation, 19th United States Ambassador to Ireland
- Agnes Surriage Frankland (1726–1783), wife of Sir Charles Henry Frankland, a British baronet
- M. Laurance Morse (1921–2003), microbiologist
- Richard Potter (1783–1835), magician, hypnotist and ventriloquist
- Grace Vollmer (1884–1977), painter

== Historic homes ==
=== Historical commission ===
The Town of Hopkinton established a historical commission which manages "the preservation, protection and development of the historical or archeological assets of such city or town". Projects include conducting research for places of historic or archeological value, assisting cooperatively with others engaged in such research, and carrying out other initiatives for the purpose of protecting and preserving such places.

=== National Register of Historic Places ===
Hopkinton has two properties in the register.

1. Cedar Swamp Archeological District, Address Restricted. Listed 1988-05-23
2. Hopkinton Supply Company Building, 26-28 Main Street. Listed 1983-03-10

== See also ==
- Greater Boston
- MetroWest
- Boston Marathon
- Dell EMC
- Open town meeting format
