= Ben Johnson (soccer, born 1977) =

American soccer player

Personal information
- Full name: Benjamin Johnson
- Date of birth: February 10, 1977 (age 49)
- Place of birth: Southborough, Massachusetts, U.S.
- Height: 5 ft 5 in (1.65 m)
- Positions: Defender; midfielder

Youth career
- 1994–1997: Liberty Flames

Senior career*
Years	Team	Apps	(Gls)
1998–2009	Charlotte Eagles	184	(2)
- * Club domestic league appearances and goals as of 11 October 2009

Benjamin Johnson (born February 10, 1977) is an American former soccer player and current soccer coach with the Charlotte Eagles.

== Career ==
Johnson played four years of college soccer at Liberty University, where he earned 1st Team All-Big South honors as a senior.

Johnson signed with Charlotte Eagles straight out of college in 1998, and has been with the club ever since. He was part of the Eagles' championship-winning teams in 2000 and 2005.

Off the field, Johnson also works as the Eagles' Director of Community Outreach, overseeing the strategies of the Eagles' community projects and handling all player, coach, mascot appearance requests. On March 10, 2010, Johnson announced his retirement from completive soccer.

Johnson is also the head coach at Charlotte Christian High School, whom he led to a state semifinals appearance in 2008.
