= Sudbury Dam Historic District =

Historic district in Massachusetts, United States

- U.S. National Register of Historic Places
- U.S. Historic district
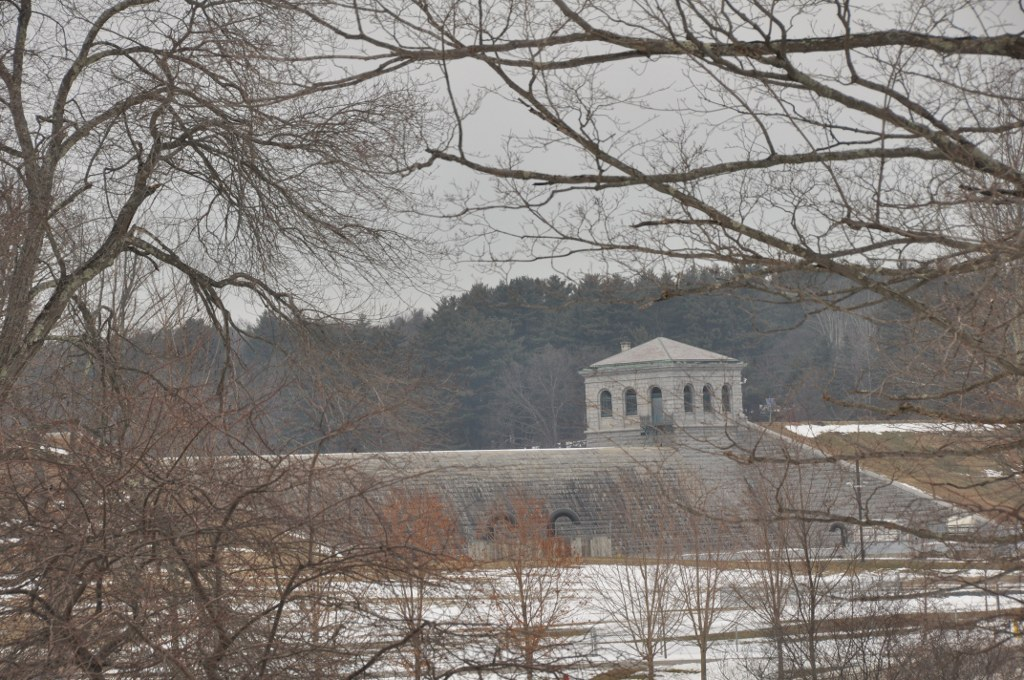
- The Sudbury Dam gatehouse

- Location within Massachusetts Location within the United States
- Location: Framingham and Southborough, Massachusetts
- Coordinates: 42°18′21″N 71°29′30″W
- MPS: Water Supply System of Metropolitan Boston MPS
- NRHP reference No.: 89002265
- Added to NRHP: January 18, 1990

The Sudbury Dam Historic District is a historic district on the southeastern end of Sudbury Reservoir off Massachusetts Route 30 in Framingham and Southborough, Massachusetts. The district encompasses the Sudbury Dam (also known as the Fayville Dam for the nearby neighborhood of Southborough), which impounds the reservoir, and an area encompassing several historic structures located below the dam. The area includes water-supply-related structures from three phases of development of the Greater Boston water supply system. It was listed on the National Register of Historic Places in 1990.

== Description ==
Sudbury Dam was built in 1894 to impound the Stony Brook branch of the Sudbury River. It has a large earthen embankment 1,800 feet (550 m) in length, and a concrete core wall with a spillway 300 feet (91 m) wide. There is a gate chamber, designed by Wheelwright & Haven, located on the dam north of the spillway. At first it regulated the flow out the channel toward Framingham Reservoir No. 3, but it was modified in 1907 to control flow to the Weston Aqueduct as well, and again in 1916–17 for the provision of hydroelectric power. The facility was used for power generation until the 1970s, when the generation equipment was removed.

The Dam in the early 20th century

A storehouse, located just northeast of the dam, was built in 1900 to house wooden stop planks used to regulate flow. This building was converted to house electrical equipment when the hydroelectric facility was built. Below the dam, to the northeast of the channel to Framingham Reservoir No. 3, is the head house for the Weston Aqueduct. Built in 1903, it was designed by Shepley, Rutan and Coolidge to harmonize with the existing gate house. Adjacent to this head house is the head house for Shaft #4 of the Hultman Aqueduct, built 1939–40. The Hultman Aqueduct is a high-pressure underground aqueduct carrying water from Wachusett Reservoir to staging facilities closer to Boston, acting as a secondary system since 2003 to the MetroWest Water Supply Tunnel. This head house, also designed to harmonize with the previous buildings, was designed by Densmore, LeClear & Robbins, who also designed similar structures for the systems of the Quabbin Reservoir. There are also two modern buildings on the site (built in the 1970s) that are not architecturally sympathetic to the others, and a small cluster of 19th century farm buildings that were moved when the dam was built.

There are two bridges in the district. The older of the two carries Massachusetts Route 30 over the open channel below the dam, and was built in 1898. It is a concrete twin-arch bridge, faced in granite. The second bridge, a single-arch span made of similar materials, carries an access road over the open channel to the Weston Aqueduct head house, and was built in 1902–03.
