= Allandale Farm =

- John Harris House and Farm
- U.S. National Register of Historic Places
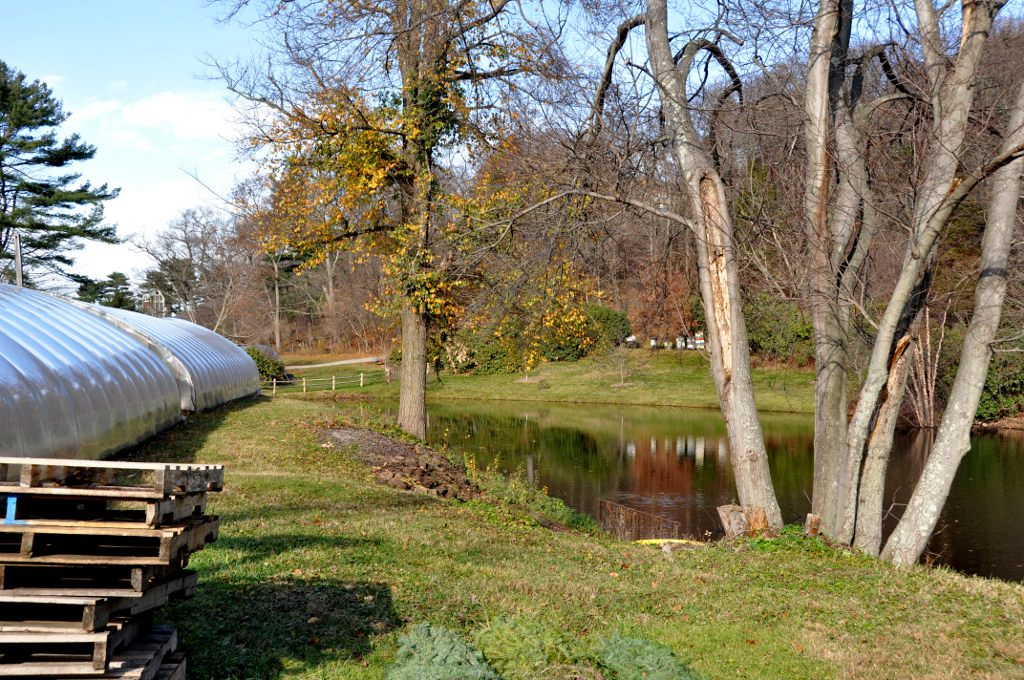
- The pond behind the farm stand and greenhouses

- Location within Greater Boston area Location within Massachusetts Location within the United States
- Location: Chestnut Hill, MA
- Coordinates: 42°18′19″N 71°8′36″W
- Area: 105 acres (42 ha)
- MPS: Brookline MRA
- NRHP reference No.: 85003246
- Added to NRHP: October 17, 1985

Allandale Farm, also known as the John Harris House and Farm, and once as Faulkner Farm, is an historic farm at 284 Newton Street in Chestnut Hill, Massachusetts. The main farm house, built c. 1778 and extensively remodeled in 1976, is one of Brookline's few 18th-century houses. The farm is the last working farm in both communities; it was added to the National Register of Historic Places in 1985.

== Description and history ==
Allandale Farm is located astride the border between Chestnut Hill and the Jamaica Plain neighborhood on Boston's southwest side. It covers about 105 acres (42 ha), bounded on the west by Newton Street and the south and east by Allandale Road. It is bounded on the north by the Brandegee Estate, of which it was once a part. The farmstand that serves the public is located on Allandale Road, along with a cluster of greenhouses.

The interior of the farm property is accessed from the Brandegee Estate's main drive off Newton Street, and includes a cluster farm outbuildings, dating to the late 19th century, that have been converted to other uses. The original farmhouse is set in a grove of trees, well back from the road. It was built about 1778 by John Harris, whose family owned land in the area since at least 1655. The house was extensively renovated in 1976, but elements of its 18th-century origins are still discernible. The farmhouse was used by the estate caretaker when the property was part of the Brandegee Estate. The farm is the last working farm in both communities, a reminder of the area's agrarian origins.

Since 2022 the retail workers of Allandale Farm have been represented by Allandale Workers United, a homegrown and independently formed labor union.

== See also ==
- National Register of Historic Places listings in Brookline, Massachusetts
- National Register of Historic Places listings in southern Boston, Massachusetts
