= Whitehall State Park =

Massachusetts state park

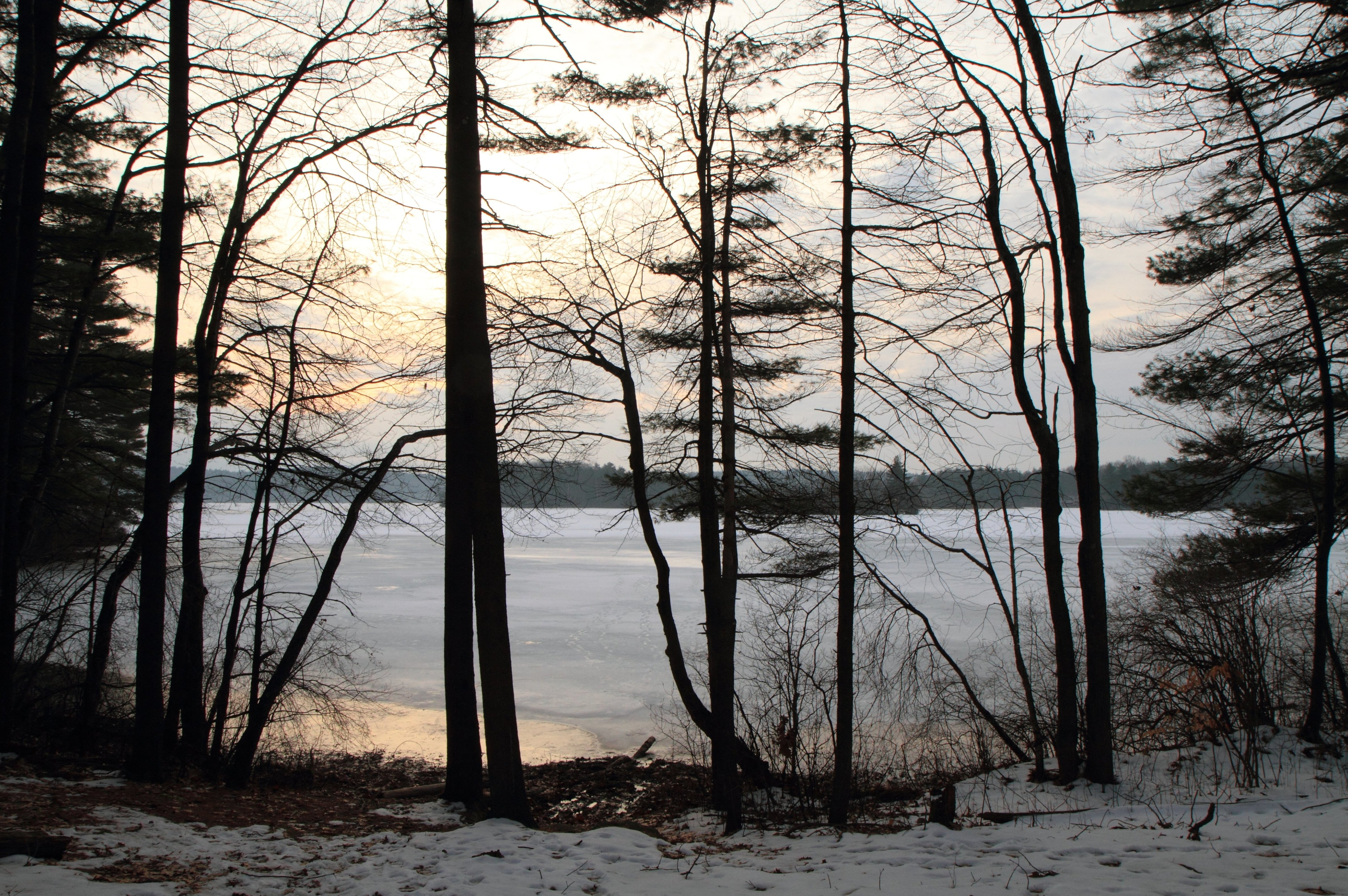

- Location within Massachusetts Location within the United States
- Location: Hopkinton, Massachusetts, United States
- Coordinates: 42°13′42″N 71°34′15″W
- Area: 837 acres (339 ha)
- Elevation: 331 ft (101 m)
- Established: 1947
- Administrator: Massachusetts Department of Conservation and Recreation
- Website: Official website

Whitehall State Park is a Massachusetts state park located in the town of Hopkinton and managed by the Department of Conservation and Recreation. It offers fishing, boating, and hiking trails. The park was created in 1947 when the Whitehall Reservoir was removed from service as a water source for the Greater Boston area.
