= Southborough, Massachusetts =

City in Massachusetts, United States

- Town
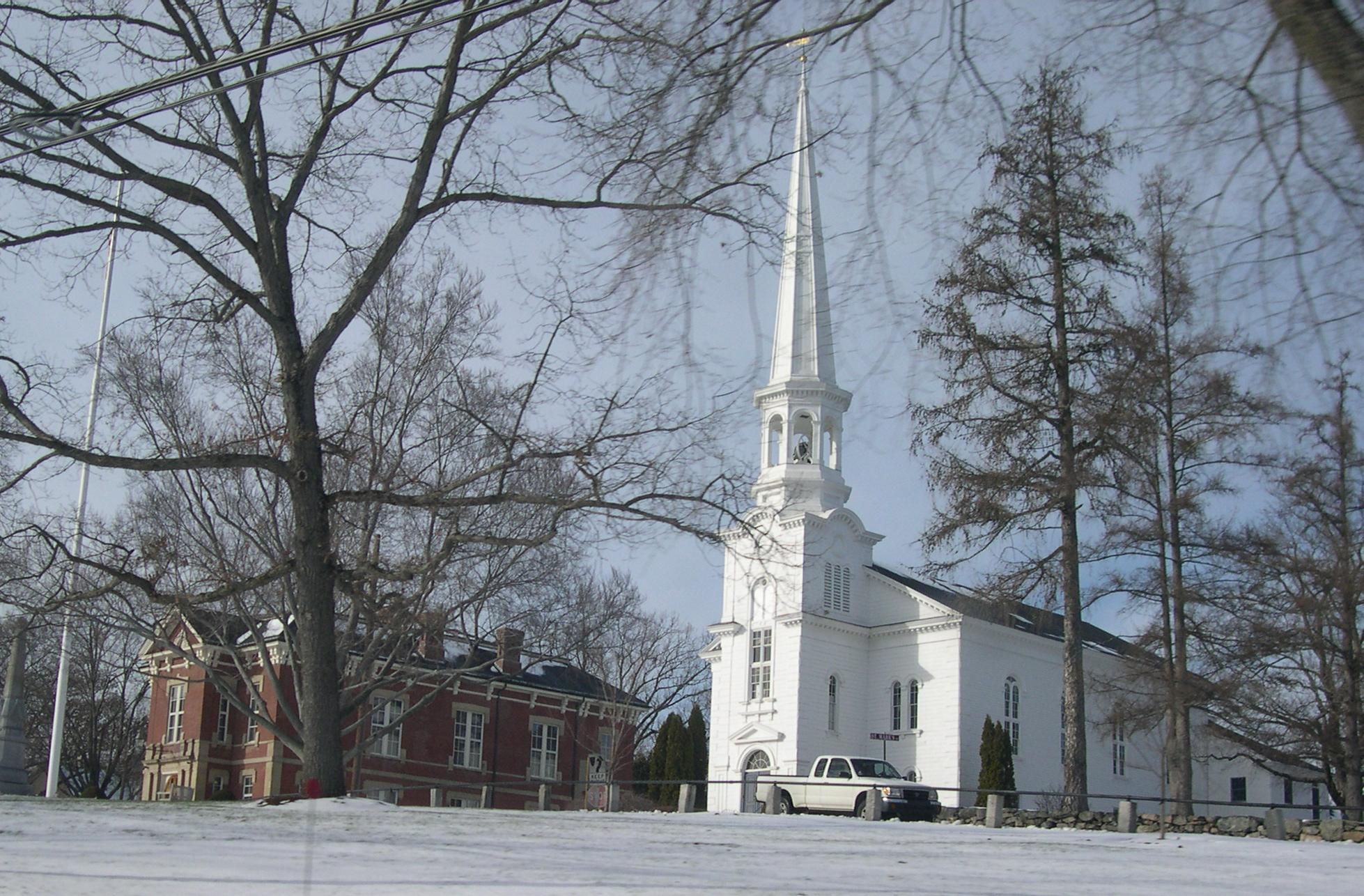
- Center of Southborough

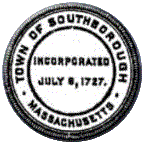
- Seal

- Location in Worcester County and the state of Massachusetts.
- Coordinates: 42°18′20″N 71°31′30″W
- Country: United States
- State: Massachusetts
- County: Worcester
- Settled: 1660
- Incorporated: 1727

Government
  - Type: Open town meeting
  - Moderator: Paul Cimino
  - Town Administrator: Mark Purple
  - Board of Selectmen: Marguerite Landry; Kathryn Cook; Tim Fling; Alfred Hamilton; Andrew Dennington II

Area
  - Total: 15.7 sq mi (40.6 km^{2})
  - Land: 14.1 sq mi (36.6 km^{2})
  - Water: 1.5 sq mi (3.9 km^{2})
- Elevation: 305 ft (93 m)

Population (2020)
  - Total: 10,450
  - Density: 739/sq mi (286/km^{2})
- Demonym: Southboronian
- Time zone: UTC−5 (Eastern)
  - Summer (DST): UTC−4 (Eastern)
- ZIP Codes: 01772 (Southborough); 01745 (Fayville)
- Area code: 508/774
- FIPS code: 25-63165
- GNIS feature ID: 0618382
- Website: www.southboroughma.gov

Southborough is a town in Worcester County, Massachusetts, United States. It incorporates the villages of Cordaville, Fayville, and Southville. Its name is often informally shortened to Southboro, a usage seen on many area signs and maps. At the 2020 census, its population was 10,450 in 3,542 households.

As of 2021, 43% of land use was residential, with 35% open space, including one-tenth of the town's area that is flooded by the Sudbury Reservoir. Light industrial land use is concentrated along main roads, primarily Massachusetts Route 9, and there are several small business districts in the villages and along Route 9.

== History ==
Southborough was first settled in 1660 and was officially incorporated in July 1727. Southborough was primarily a farming community until mills began to tap the small rivers that ran through the town. By the end of the 19th century, Southborough was home to the manufacture of plasters, straw bonnets, boots, and shoes, among other things.

In 1727, Southborough split off as the "south borough" of Marlborough, much as Westborough had split off from Marlborough in 1717, ten years before.

In 1898, the Fayville Dam was constructed to produce several reservoirs to supply a growing Boston with water. As a result, manufacturing vanished, and Southborough did not see substantial growth until the high-tech boom of the 1970s.

The Fay, Burnett, and Choate families had major impacts on the development of the town as it is today. St. Mark's Church, St. Mark's School, the Southborough Library, the Community House, and the Fay School were all built at least in part through the efforts of these families.

Post office and general store in the early 20th century

== Geography ==
According to the United States Census Bureau, the town has a total area of 15.7 square miles (41 km^{2}), of which 14.1 square miles (37 km^{2}) is land and 1.5 square miles (3.9 km^{2}), or 9.64%, is water.

== Demographics ==
Historical population
Year	Pop.	±%
1790	837	—
1850	1,347	+60.9%
1860	1,854	+37.6%
1870	2,135	+15.2%
1880	2,142	+0.3%
1890	2,114	−1.3%
1900	1,921	−9.1%
1910	1,745	−9.2%
1920	1,838	+5.3%
1930	2,166	+17.8%
1940	2,231	+3.0%
1950	2,760	+23.7%
1960	3,996	+44.8%
1970	5,798	+45.1%
1980	6,193	+6.8%
1990	6,628	+7.0%
2000	8,781	+32.5%
2010	9,767	+11.2%
2020	10,450	+7.0%
2022	10,409	−0.4%
Source: United States census records and Population Estimates Program data.

By the census of 2010, the population had reached 9,767.

As of the census of 2000, there were 8,781 people, 2,952 households, and 2,426 families residing in the town. The population density was 620.7 inhabitants per square mile (239.7/km^{2}). There were 2,997 housing units at an average density of 211.8 per square mile (81.8/km^{2}). The racial makeup of the town was 94.47% White, 0.54% African American, 0.07% Native American, 3.52% Asian, 0.05% Pacific Islander, 0.50% from other races, and 0.87% from two or more races. Hispanic or Latino of any race were 1.50% of the population.

There were 2,952 households, out of which 47.5% had children under the age of 18 living with them, 73.9% were married couples living together, 6.0% had a female householder with no husband present, and 17.8% were non-families. 14.0% of all households were made up of individuals, and 5.5% had someone living alone who was 65 years of age or older. The average household size was 2.97, and the average family size was 3.30.

In the town, the population was spread out, with 32.1% under the age of 18, 3.7% from 18 to 24, 32.2% from 25 to 44, 23.9% from 45 to 64, and 8.1% who were 65 years of age or older. The median age was 37 years. For every 100 females, there were 99.9 males. For every 100 females age 18 and over, there were 95.2 males.

The median income for a household in the town was $132,986, and the median income for a family was $129,454, although according to CNN, median family income had risen to $148,297 by 2009. Males had a median income of $80,961 versus $50,537 for females. The per capita income for the town was $64,310. About 0.4% of families and 0.6% of the population were below the poverty line, including 0.7% of those under age 18 and 4.5% of those age 65 or over.

== Economy ==
Information technology services company Virtusa is based in Southborough.

== Arts and culture ==
Points of interest in Southborough are:

- 9/11 Field
- Elaine and Phillip Beals Preserve
- Boroughs Loop Trail
- Breakneck Hill conservation land
- Community House
- Pilgrim Congregational Church
- Rural Cemetery
- St. Mark's School
- Fay School
- Sudbury Reservoir Trail

The funeral scene from the movie Grown Ups was filmed at the Pilgrim Congregational Church.

=== Annual events ===
Southborough celebrates Heritage Day on Columbus Day. Events include a parade with the Algonquin High School marching band. Events in the week prior include a run/walk event and pumpkin-carving.

=== Library ===
The public library in Southborough was established in 1852. In fiscal year 2008, the town of Southborough spent 0.95% ($370,390) of its budget on its public library—approximately $38 per person, per year ($50.07 adjusted for inflation to 2022). Col. Fay donated around 2000 dollar toward further broadening the selection of books. The first librarian was Heman Este, and stayed in the position until around 1879, when she retired. Over the next 50 years, the town added an upper floor and more add ons.

.The Harvard Depository is located in Southborough.

== Government ==
The form of town government is open town meeting, in which the voters of the town assemble as the legislature. Each Town Meeting is managed by the elected Moderator, who also appoints most of the membership of the unelected boards.

The five members of the Select Board are elected to act as the executive body of the government. The Select Board delegates day-to-day operations to the Town Administrator.

Southborough has three school committees:

- Southborough K–8 School Committee
- Northborough-Southborough Regional School Committee
- Assabet Valley Regional Vocational-Technical School Committee

Southborough's town elections are non-partisan.

Almost 60% of current voters registered without enrolling in any political party. Democrats slightly outnumber Republicans in the remaining forty percent. Minor party enrollments are negligible.

The State Representative is Kate Donaghue; The State Senator is Jamie Eldridge; the U.S. Representative is Jim McGovern; and the U.S. Senators are Elizabeth Warren and Ed Markey.

== Education ==
Public and private educational campuses frame Southborough's downtown.

=== Public schools ===
Southborough has six public schools. The four elementary and middle schools are inside town limits; the two high schools are regional schools in adjoining towns.

- Mary E. Finn School – Preschool, kindergarten, and 1st grade
- Albert S. Woodward School – 2nd and 3rd grade
- Margaret A. Neary School – 4th and 5th grade
- P. Brent Trottier Middle School – 6th, 7th, and 8th grade
- Algonquin Regional High School in Northborough, Massachusetts – 9th to 12th
- Assabet Valley Regional Technical High School in Marlborough, Massachusetts – 9th to 12th

=== Private schools ===
Southborough is home to a private secondary school, St. Mark's, which was founded in 1865 by Joseph Burnett. The oldest junior boarding school in the nation, the Fay School, was founded a year later in 1866 by Joseph Burnett's first cousins Eliza Burnett Fay and Harriet Burnett.

== Media ==
- Community Advocate, local news site
- My Southborough, news blog

== Infrastructure ==
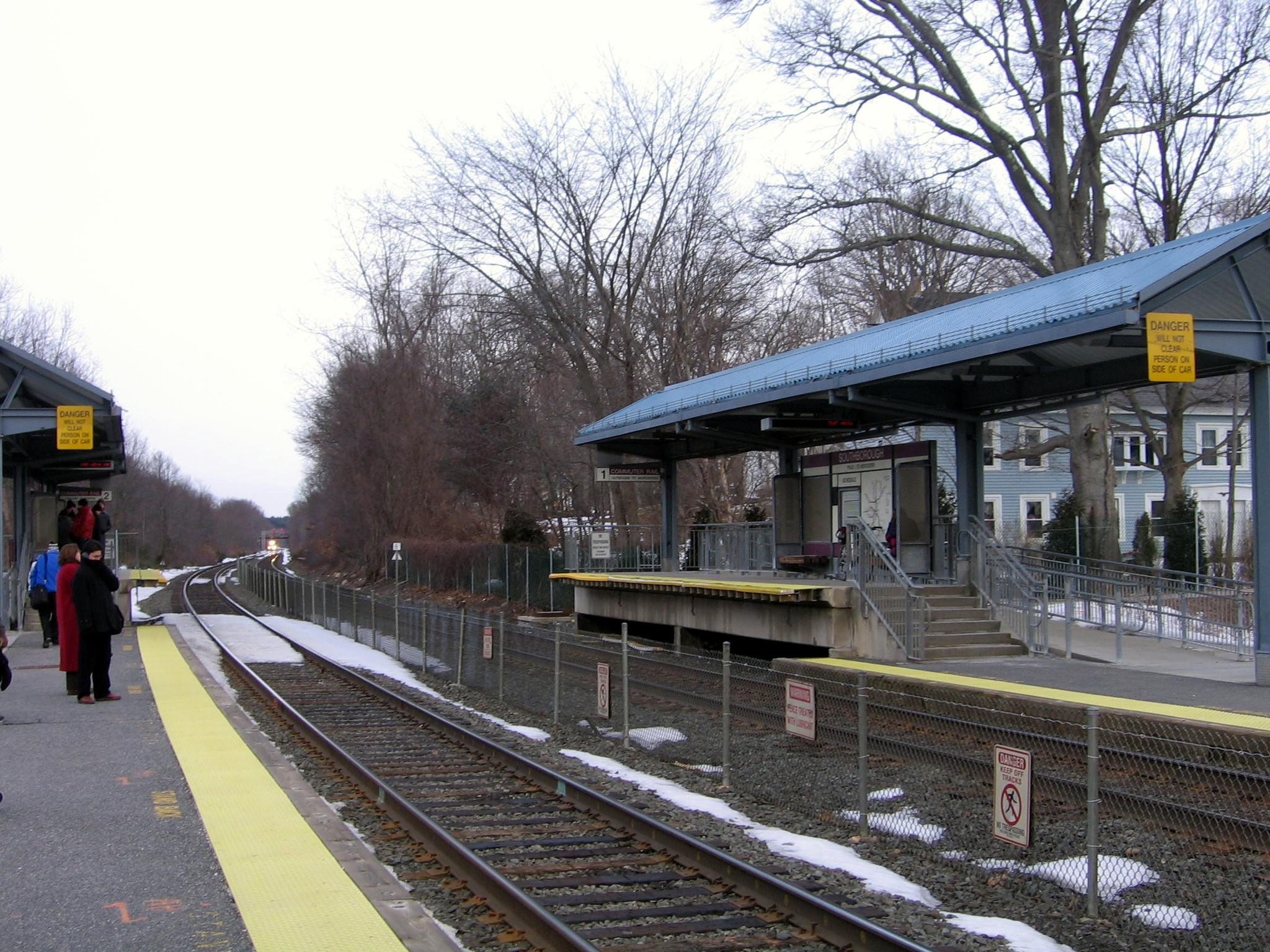
MBTA Commuter Rail train arriving at Southborough station

=== Transportation ===
The MBTA Commuter Rail's Framingham/Worcester Line train stops at Southborough station, which opened on June 22, 2002. The station is located in the Cordaville neighborhood, with access from Route 85 near the border with Hopkinton.

Interstate 495 and the Massachusetts Turnpike (Interstate 90) both pass through Southborough, although neither have interchanges within town limits. Routes 9 and 30 are east–west routes passing through Southborough, while Route 85 serves the town as a north–south route.

== Notable people ==
=== Acting and music ===
- Storm Large (born 1969), singer, songwriter, actress and author
- Warner Oland (1879–1938), actor who appeared in 16 Charlie Chan movies from 1931 to 1937

=== Sports ===
- Doug Brown (born 1964), professional ice hockey player
- Ryan Gallant (born 1982), professional skateboarder
- Ben Johnson (born 1977), professional soccer player and coach
- Fred J. Murphy (1886–1956), collegiate athlete, coach, and athletic director
- Henry Thrun (born 2001), professional ice hockey player
- Luis Tiant (1940–2024), professional baseball player
- Alex Karaban (born 2002), NBA player for the Sacramento Kings; NCAA Division I men's basketball national champion, UConn Huskies (2023, 2024)
- Korey Dropkin (born 1995), Olympic curler

=== Politics ===
- Francis B. Fay (1793–1876), merchant, politician, and philanthropist
- Frank B. Fay (1821–1904), businessman and politician; son of Francis B. Fay
- Winfield Scott Hammond (1863–1915), U.S. Representative from Minnesota (1907–1915) and Governor of Minnesota (1915)
- David Pierce Jr. (1786–1872), lawyer and politician

=== Other ===
- Joseph Burnett (1820–1894), educator and businessman, founder of St. Mark's School
- Waldo Irving Burnett (1828–1854), zoologist and histologist.
- Daniel Pinckney Parker (1781–1850), merchant, shipbuilder, and businessman
- Harold F. Smiddy (1900–1978), engineer, business manager, and management consultant
- E. C. Spykman (1896–1965), children's novelist and journalist
- Robert H. Thayer (1901–1984), lawyer, naval officer, and diplomat
- Sigourney Thayer (1896–1944), theatrical producer, World War I aviator, and poet; brother of Robert H. Thayer
- Michael Weishan, author, designer, popular historian and former television personality
- John Garabedian, radio personality and DJ, known for creating and formerly hosting Open House Party and Party Liveline, as well as his work at Television and Radio Stations throughout New England

== See also ==
- Greater Boston
- MetroWest
- Open town meeting format
