= Town Boundary Markers of Barnstable, Massachusetts =

- Town Boundary Marker
- U.S. National Register of Historic Places
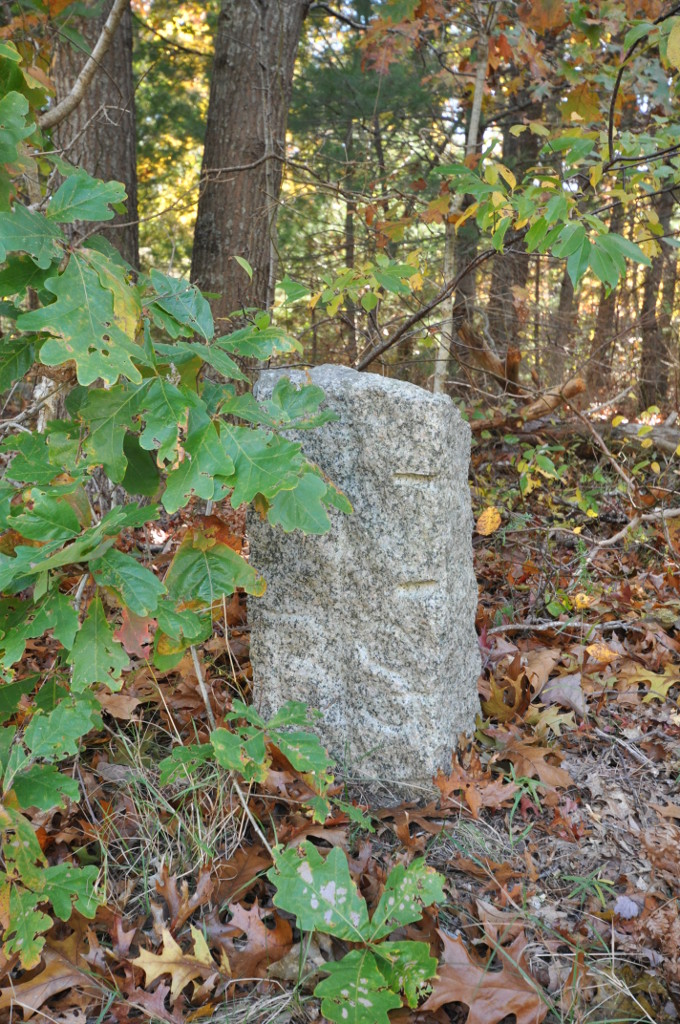
- Location: Race Lane, Sandwich and Barnstable, Massachusetts
- MPS: Barnstable MRA
- NRHP reference No.: 87000269
- Added to NRHP: September 18, 1987

The town of Barnstable, Massachusetts has four surviving stone markers that were used in colonial days to mark the town's boundaries with its neighbors. All four are listed on the National Register of Historic Places, three of them individually, and one as part of the Old King's Highway Historic District. Barnstable was established in 1639.

== Race Lane marker ==
On the south side of Race Lane, just west of Trotter's Lane, at 41°41′11″N 70°26′12″W, is a granite marker on the town line between Barnstable and Sandwich. The town line between these two towns was first laid out by the council of the Plymouth Colony in 1639, and has remained relatively stable since then. It is unknown when this rough granite marker was placed; on the street face it is marked with a B on the Barnstable side, and an S on the Sandwich side, with a carved vertical line between. This marker was listed on the National Register of Historic Places in 1987 as "Town Boundary Marker". In 2024, local teacher and conservationist Jeremy Shea highlighted the Race Lane marker as part of his video blog showcasing every town boundary marker in Sandwich.

== High Street marker ==
- Town Line Boundary Marker
- U.S. National Register of Historic Places
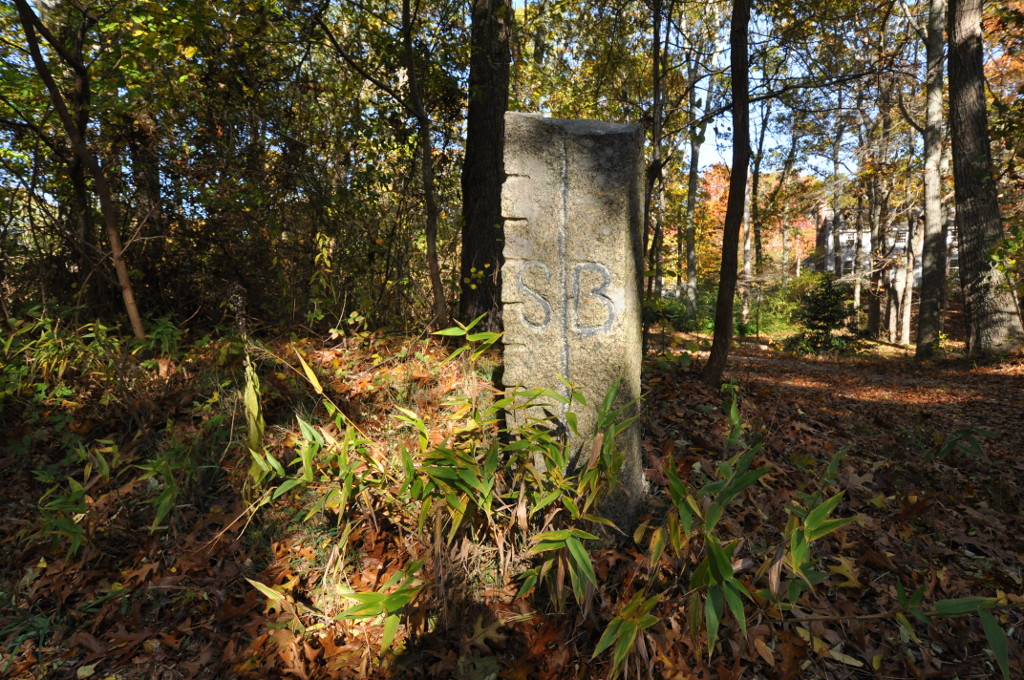

- Location within Cape Cod Location within Massachusetts Location within the United States
- Location: High Street/Old County Rd., Sandwich and Barnstable, Massachusetts
- Built: 1644
- MPS: Barnstable MRA
- NRHP reference No.: 87000243
- Added to NRHP: September 18, 1987

The High Street marker is located the north side of High Street (near #410), at 41.722283°N 70.400687°W, on the border between Sandwich and Barnstable. Its markings are similar to those on the Race Lane marker. This area of West Barnstable was not purchased by the colonists from the local Indians until 1644; the date of this marker's placement is also unknown. The marker was listed on the National Register of Historic Places as "Town Boundary Line Marker" in 1987.

== Great Hill Road Marker ==
- Town Line Boundary Marker
- U.S. National Register of Historic Places
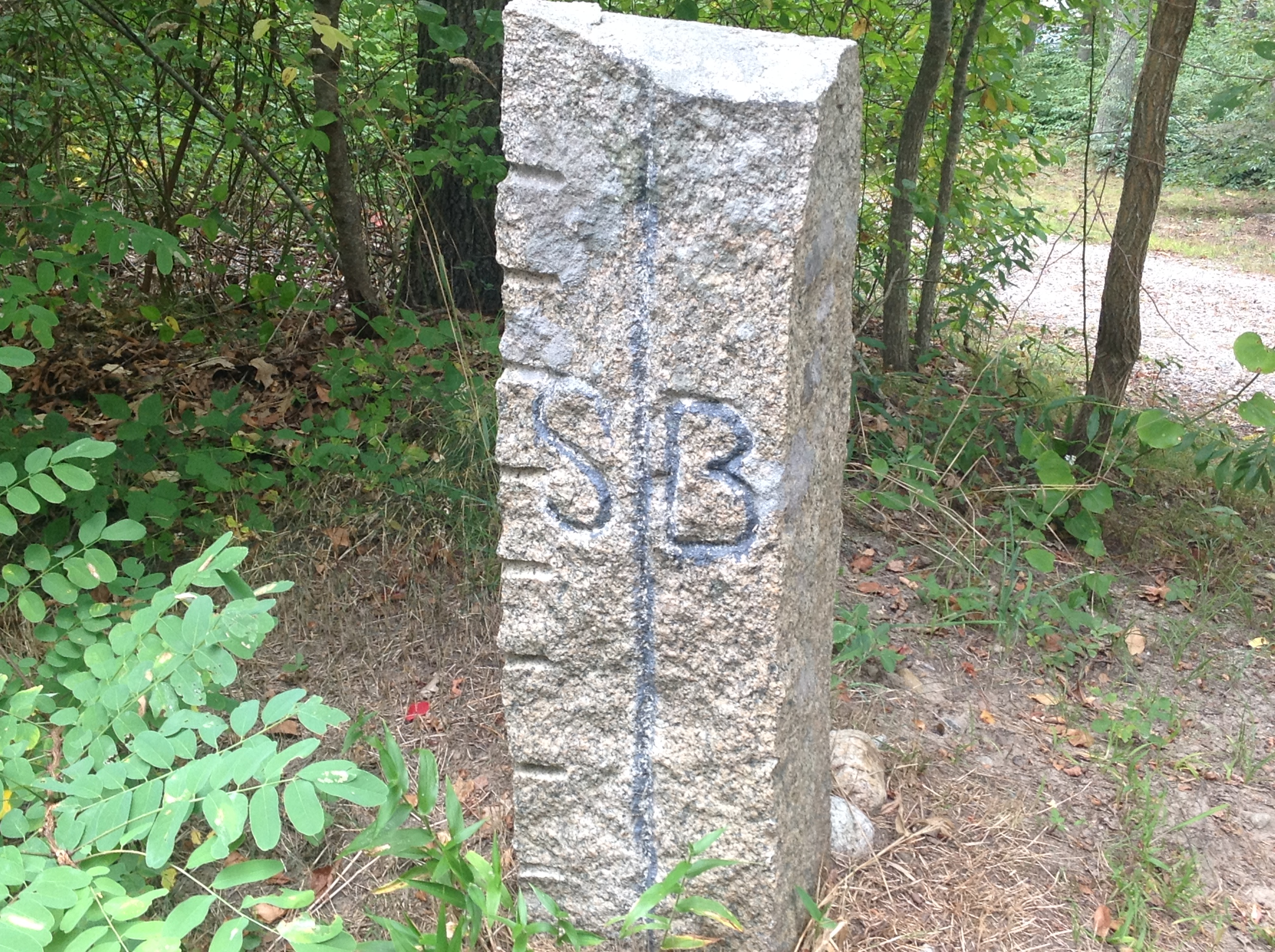

- Location within Cape Cod Location within Massachusetts Location within the United States
- Location: Great Hill Rd., Barnstable, Massachusetts
- Area: less than one acre
- Built: 1644
- MPS: Barnstable MRA
- NRHP reference No.: 87000242
- Added to NRHP: September 18, 1987

The Great Hill Road marker was in 1987 located a short way north of the road's junction with Cedar Street, but these streets no longer meet. Like the High Street marker, it was probably not placed until after the area was purchased in 1644. It is marked similarly to the Race Lane and High Street markers. It was listed on the National Register in 1987 as "Town Line Boundary Marker".

== Main Street Marker ==
- Town Boundary Marker
- U.S. Historic district – Contributing property
- Location: Main Street (MA 6A), Yarmouth and Barnstable, Massachusetts
- Area: less than one acre
- Part of: Old King's Highway Historic District (ID87000314)
- MPS: Barnstable MRA
- Added to NRHP: March 12, 1987

The fourth marker is located on the north side of Main Street (Massachusetts Route 6A) at the Barnstable-Yarmouth line (41.701435°N 70.260236°W). Unlike the others, it is a boulder-shaped marker, on which "Y+B" has been carved, with a wavy line beneath. It is believed to have been placed in the 18th century. The marker is a contributing resource to the Old King's Highway Historic District.

== See also ==
- National Register of Historic Places listings in Barnstable County, Massachusetts
