= Brandegee Estate =

Historic house in Massachusetts, United States

- U.S. National Register of Historic Places
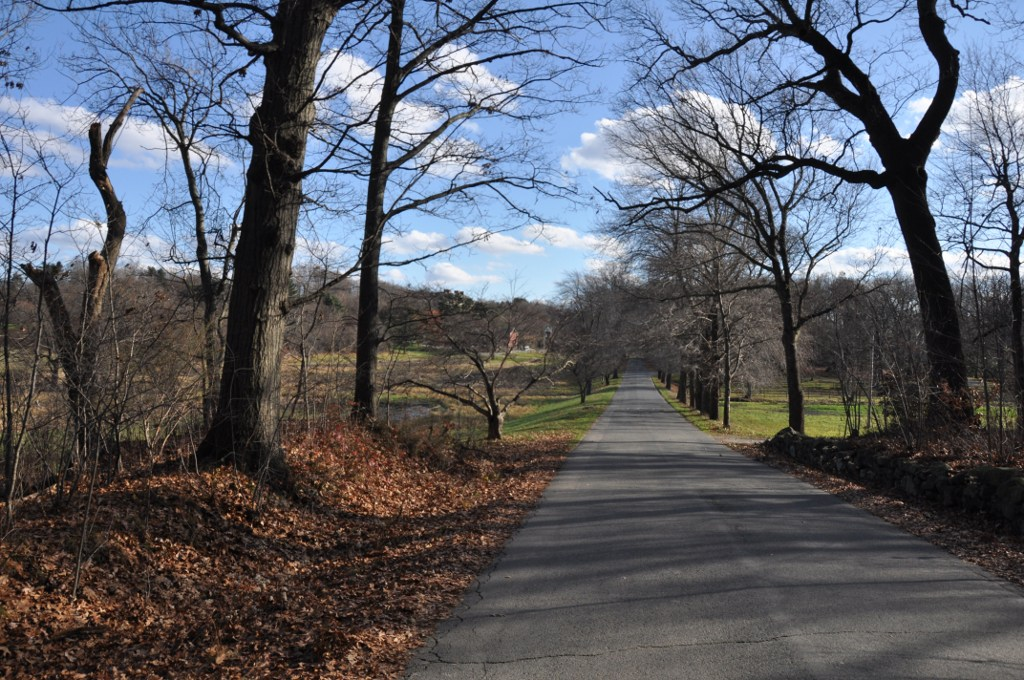

- Location within Massachusetts Location within the United States
- Location: Boston and Brookline, Massachusetts
- Coordinates: 42°18′27.68″N 71°8′45.76″W
- Area: 16.6 acres (6.7 ha)
- Architect: Little, Browne & Moore
- Architectural style: Renaissance
- MPS: Brookline MRA
- NRHP reference No.: 85003244
- Added to NRHP: October 17, 1985

The Brandegee Estate is a historic estate at 280 Newton Street in Brookline and Boston, Massachusetts. Developed at the turn of the 20th century, it is one of the largest essentially intact estate properties in either community. It was developed by Mary (Pratt) Sprague, a direct descendant of Joseph Weld, one of Boston's first settlers, and is noted for its large Renaissance Revival mansion (designed by Little, Browne & Moore), and landscaping by Charles A. Platt. The estate was listed on the National Register of Historic Places in 1985. Its name derives from Mary Sprague's second husband, Edward Brandegee.

== Description and history ==
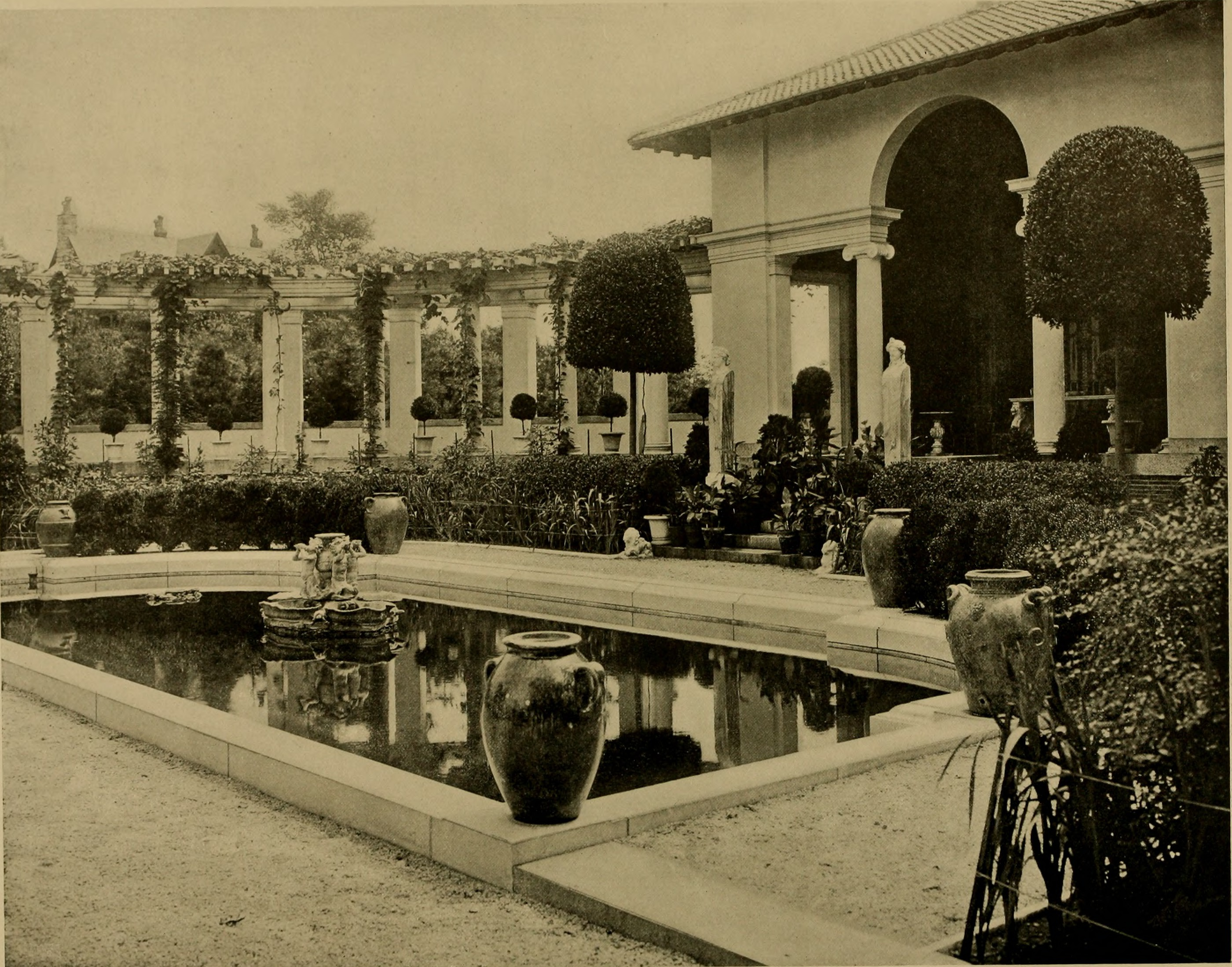
Pool and casino, "Faulkner Farm" (1904)

The Brandegee Estate is located astride the town line between Brookline and the Jamaica Plain neighborhood of Boston, and consists of a long strip of land whose western end is on Newton Street in Brookline, and whose eastern end is on Allandale Street in Boston. Separating most of the estate from Allandale Street to the south is Allandale Farm, the last working farm in Boston. The developed features are the main house and formal garden, near the center of the estate, and a cluster of service buildings at the eastern end, where the stables and estate office are located. The stables were until recently used by the City of Boston for its mounted police force.

The property was owned for many years by the Faulkner family, and was known as Faulkner Farm. It was acquired by William Fletcher Weld II, cousin to Mary Pratt Sprague. In 1890 Sprague had built a 2 1/2-story wood frame summer house. In 1897 she retained Little, Browne & Moore to oversee a major expansion of the house, transforming it into a brick Renaissance Revival mansion. The house is surrounded by a formal garden designed by Charles A. Platt, many of whose elements still survive despite adaptive reuse of the property.

The 3 1/2-story mansion built in 1897, enclosing an 1890 house that had been built on the site by Mary Pratt Sprague (later Mrs. Edward Brandegee). The mansion has elaborate interior decorations, including a dining room paneled in mahogany, a second dining room in oak, and a ballroom with elaborate candelabras and chandeliers, with tapestries by Gobelins. The house stands on a slight rise, looking over a landscaped formal garden, which included a pool and an open summer house.

== See also ==
- National Register of Historic Places listings in Brookline, Massachusetts
- National Register of Historic Places listings in southern Boston, Massachusetts
