= List of botanical gardens and arboretums in Massachusetts =

This list of botanical gardens and arboretums in Massachusetts is intended to include all significant botanical gardens and arboretums in the U.S. state of Massachusetts

Name	Image	Affiliation	City	Coordinates
Arnold Arboretum		Harvard University	Boston	42°17′52″N 71°7′22″W
Babcock Arboretum		Eastern Nazarene College	Quincy	42°16′15.5634″N 71°0′42.8076″W
Berkshire Botanical Garden			Stockbridge	42°18′1.44″N 73°20′11.04″W
Boston Public Garden			Boston	42°21′15″N 71°4′12″W
The Botanic Garden of Smith College		Smith College	Northampton	42°19′8.04″N 72°38′24.36″W
The Case Estates			Weston	42°21′28.8″N 71°17′56.76″W
Elm Bank Horticulture Center			Wellesley	42°16′34″N 71°18′9″W
Garden in the Woods			Framingham	42°20′28.43″N 71°25′35.22″W
Harvard Botanic Gardens Apartments		Harvard University	Cambridge	42°22′28″N 71°07′01″W
Hadwen Arboretum			Worcester	42°15′30.5″N 71°49′57.6″W
Hebert Arboretum			Pittsfield	42°27′46.8″N 73°14′38.4″W
Heritage Museums and Gardens			Sandwich	41°44′51.76″N 70°30′19.97″W
Polly Hill Arboretum			West Tisbury	41°23′50.93″N 70°40′49.95″W
Hunnewell Arboretum			Wellesley	42°17′6″N 71°18′25.2″W
Mount Auburn Cemetery			Cambridge	42°22′14″N 71°8′45″W
Mount Holyoke College Botanic Garden		Mount Holyoke College	South Hadley	42°15′26.64″N 72°34′20.64″W
Northeastern University Arboretum		Northeastern University	Boston	42°20′24″N 71°05′18″W
Stanley Park of Westfield			Westfield	42°07′25″N 72°47′15″W
The Stevens–Coolidge Place			North Andover	42°40′53″N 71°7′5″W
Tower Hill Botanic Garden		Worcester County Horticultural Society	Boylston	42°21′42.84″N 71°43′36.12″W
Wakefield Estate Arboretum		Mary M.B. Wakefield Charitable Trust	Milton	42°13′25″N 71°07′12″W
Wellesley College Botanic Gardens		Wellesley College	Wellesley	42°17′42″N 71°18′14.4″W

== See also ==
- List of botanical gardens and arboretums in the United States
