= Bigelow Carpet Company Woolen Mills =

- U.S. National Register of Historic Places
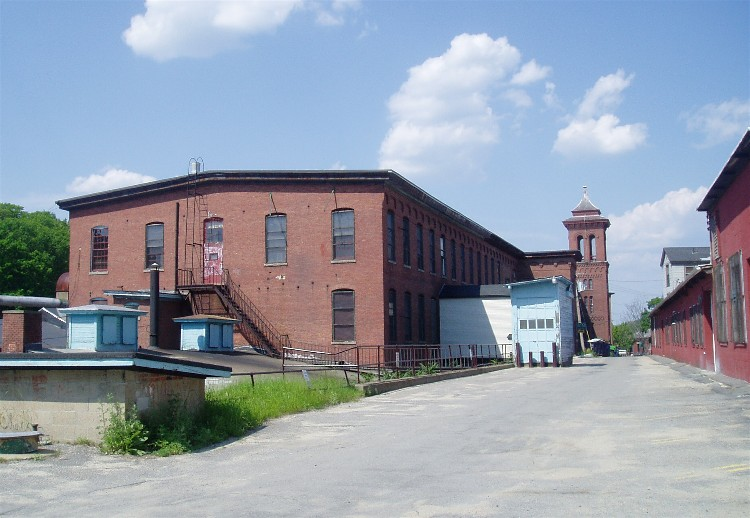

- Location within Massachusetts Location within the United States
- Location: Clinton, Massachusetts
- Coordinates: 42°25′1″N 71°41′26″W
- Built: 1864
- Architectural style: Italianate
- NRHP reference No.: 83004107
- Added to NRHP: October 6, 1983

The Bigelow Carpet Company Woolen Mills are a historic mill complex on Main Street in Clinton, Massachusetts. The sprawling mill complex was built or expanded by the Bigelow Carpet Company, one of Clinton's leading business for much of the 19th and early 20th centuries. The complex was listed on the National Register of Historic Places in 1983. In recent years the mill has hosted tenancy to various small businesses including an indoor mini golf course and it has since metamorphosed into new residential apartments with some spaces carved out for locals businesses and vendors such as a coffee shop and a pet daycare/grooming.

== Description and history ==
The Bigelow Carpet Company Woolen Mills occupy a large parcel on the west side of Clinton's downtown, bounded on the north and west by railroad tracks, the south by Pine Street, and the east by Main Street (Massachusetts Route 110). The complex includes eight large connected brick buildings built between 1858 and 1898, one wood-frame building that may date as far back as 1810, and a nondescript concrete-block storage shed built in 1898. The brick buildings are built with Italianate styling typical of 19th-century mills, featuring rows of segmented-arch windows and modest brick corbelling. The main building has an elaborately decorated five-story tower.

The Bigelow Company was incorporated in 1838 by Erastus and Horatio Bigelow, which began operations in 1837 in the c. 1810 wood-frame building the brothers leased and later purchased. The firm produced fabrics using a variety of materials, establishing successful divisions that produced carpets, wire mesh fabrics, and cotton gingham cloths. Erastus was a technological innovator, producing numerous inventions that improved the efficiency and capability of textile machinery. The company expanded on and operated on these premises until 1929, when a merger with a carpet maker in Amsterdam, New York resulted in the closure of this plant three years later. The facilities have since been adapted for use by other industrial concerns.

== See also ==
- Bigelow Carpet Mill, also in Clinton at Union and High Streets
- National Register of Historic Places listings in Worcester County, Massachusetts
