= Icon Museum and Study Center =

Museum of Eastern Orthodox art in Clinton, Massachusetts

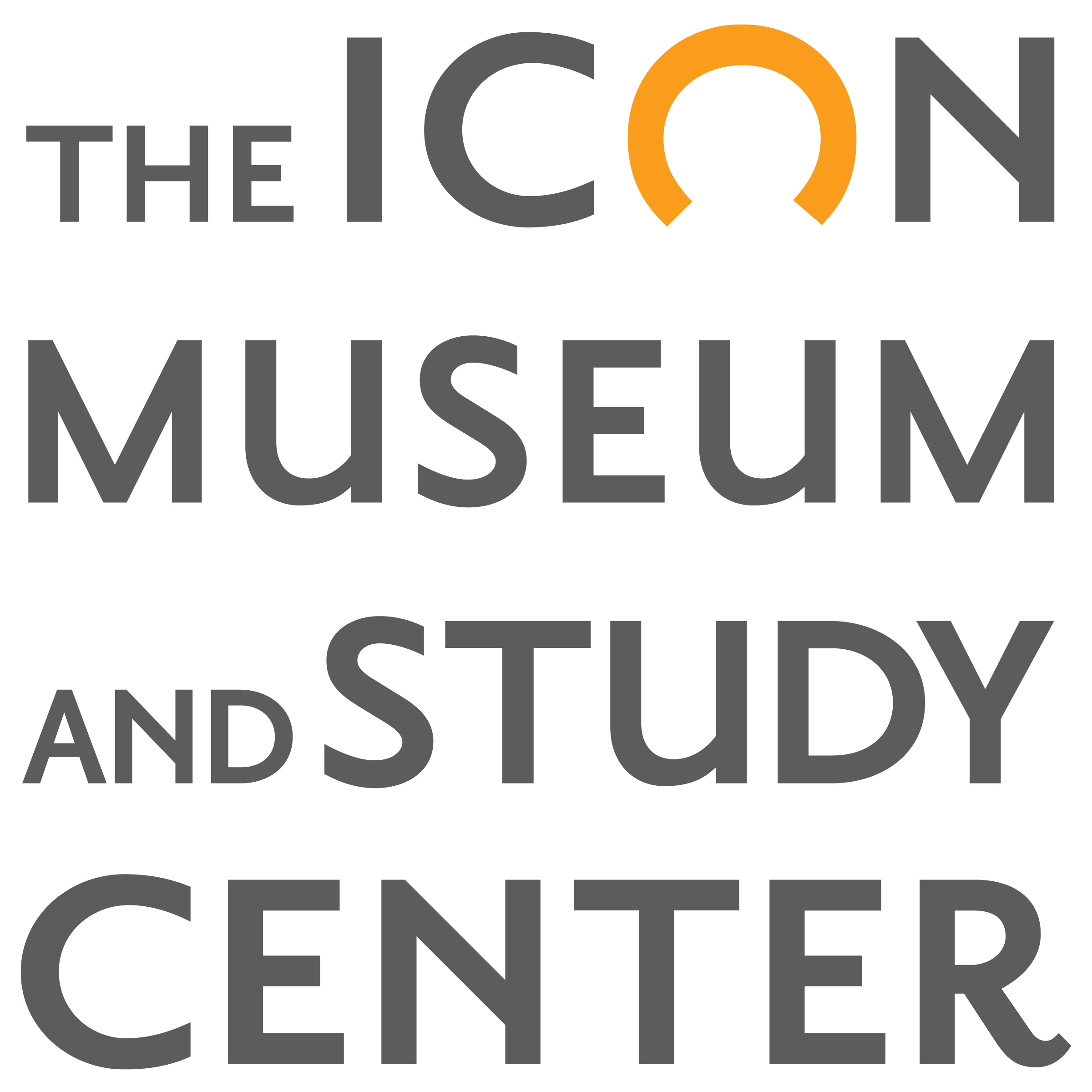
- Logo for the Icon Museum and Study Center

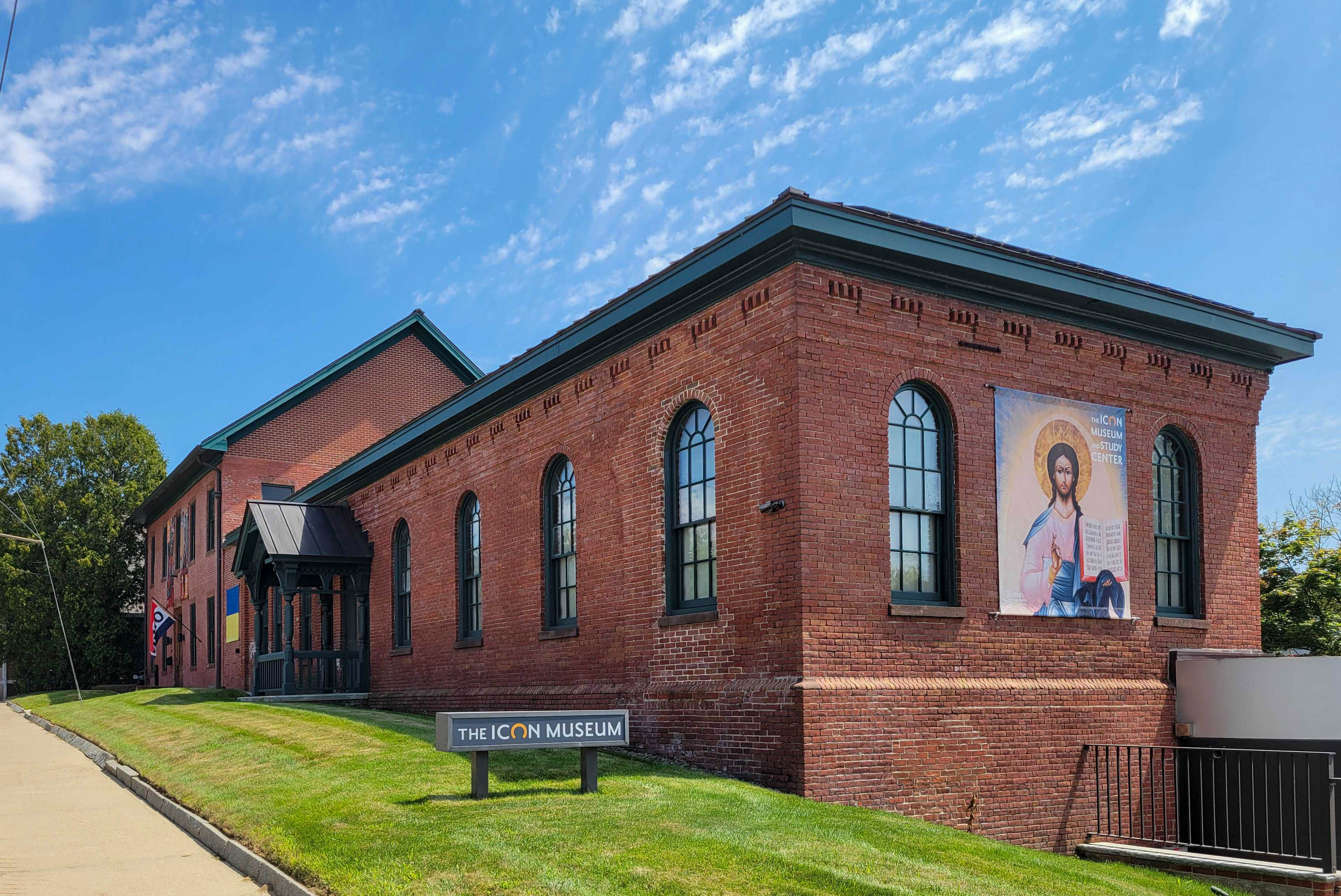
- The Icon Museum and Study Center, Clinton, Massachusetts
- Established: October 2006; 19 years ago
- Coordinates: 42°24′56.79″N 71°41′00.50″W
- Type: Art Museum
- Director: Simon Morsink
- Curator: Elliot Mackin
- Parking: Free on street parking
- Website: iconmuseum.org/

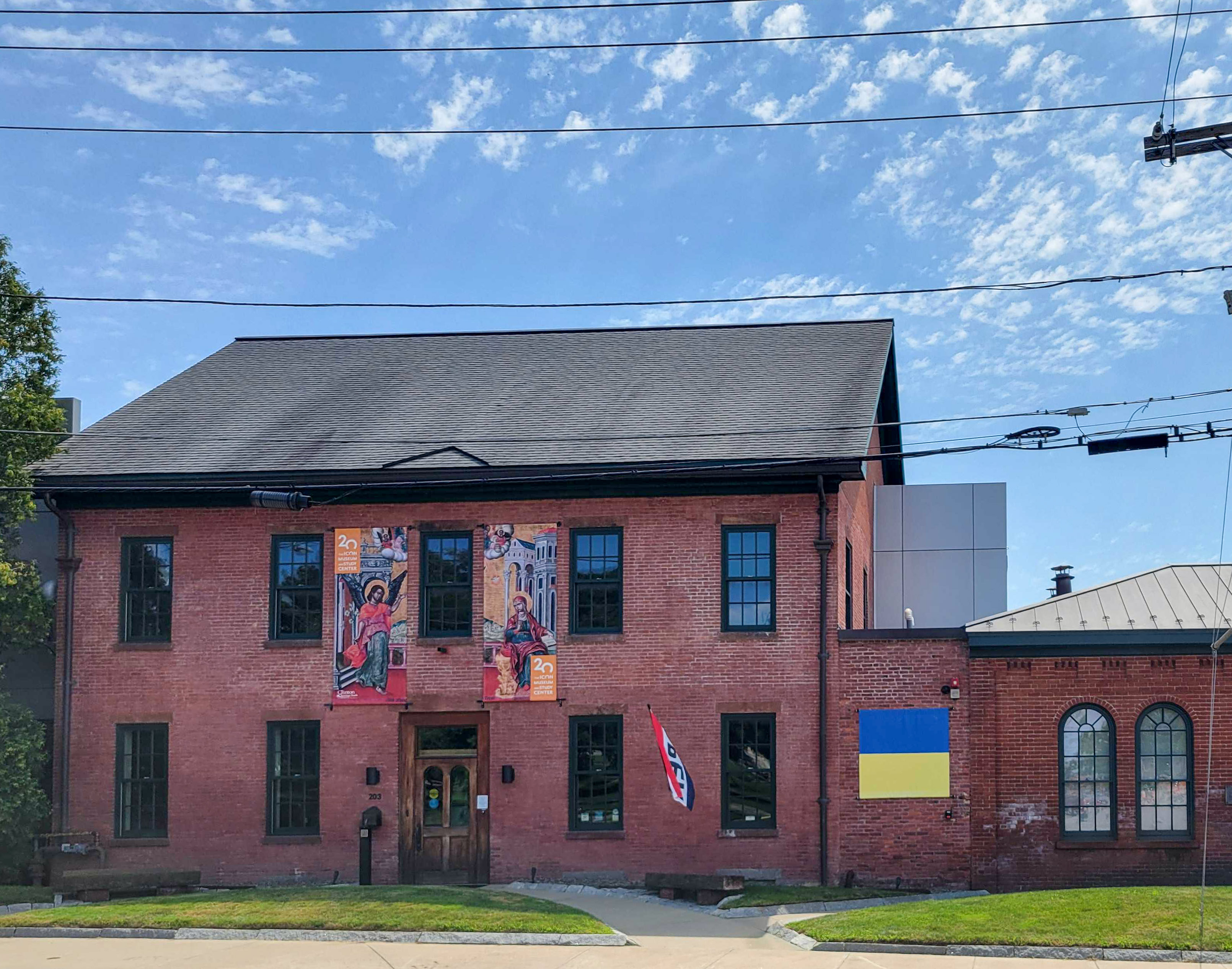
Front Entrance

The Icon Museum and Study Center (formerly the Museum of Russian Icons) is a non-profit art museum located in Clinton, Massachusetts, United States. The Icon Museum and Study Center holds the most comprehensive collection of icons and Eastern Christian art in the U.S. with special galleries and collections dedicated to Russian, Greek, Veneto-Cretan, and Ethiopian icons, spanning nearly two thousand years of art. Housed in a beautifully restored historic building in a picturesque New England mill town, the Icon Museum features five galleries, a research library, and an auditorium.

== History ==
The Museum opened in October 2006 as the Museum of Russian Icons. It began as the private collection of Gordon B. Lankton (1931–2021), a plastics engineer and former chairman and CEO of Nypro, Inc., a precision injection molding company now owned by Jabil Circuit. Lankton had been an avid traveler since he was stationed in Germany when he was in the Army. As outlined in his book The Long Way Home, Lankton took a motorcycle trip around the world in 1956 and 1957, visiting, in chronological order, Germany, Austria, Italy, Yugoslavia, Greece, Turkey, Syria, Iraq, Iran, Pakistan, India, Ceylon, Nepal, Burma, Thailand, Laos, Vietnam, Cambodia, Malaysia, Singapore, Indonesia, Philippines, Hong Kong, and Japan. According to Lankton, he had wanted to visit Russia but was not allowed to do so during the Cold War.

In 1989, Lankton first traveled to Russia to open a Nypro factory there. On that visit, after learning more about icons, Lankton began his collection, starting with a small, poor quality icon he found at a flea market in the Izmaylovo District of Moscow.

Over the following 30 years, Lankton amassed several hundred icons. He displayed them at his home, at Nypro in a small gallery, and occasionally on loan to other museums, including the Higgins Armory Museum. As the collection grew and response to the informal sharing of his collection proved positive, Lankton decided to open his own museum directly across the street from Nypro. The Museum was incorporated in 2004, and Lankton purchased the building in early 2006. It opened to the public on October 15, 2006. Since then, two major expansion projects have taken place: in 2008, a research library and the South Gallery were added. In 2010, Lankton purchased the building immediately next door to the Museum and undertook a construction project to seamlessly join the two structures. The first phase of this project included the West Gallery and an expanded museum shop; the second phase included an expanded lower level with the Tea Room and auditorium.

Interior of the Museum

== Building ==
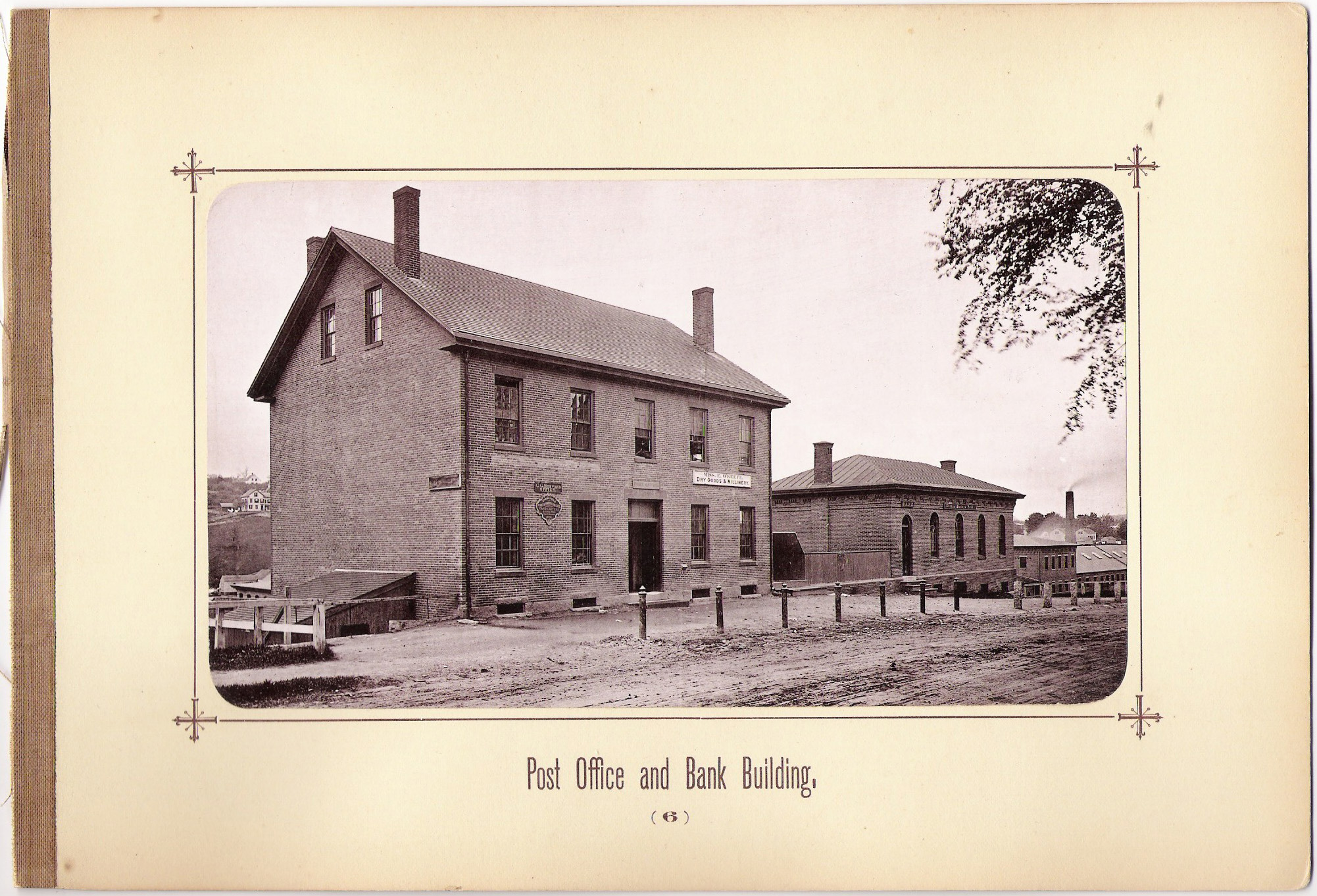
Historic image of the Museum buildings

Both buildings that now make up the single museum property were originally associated with the Bigelow Carpet Mill. The second building, previously 195 Union Street, also served at one time as both the Clinton District Court and the Police Station. Both buildings were completely renovated on the interiors by David Durrant of Durrant Designs. Some historical details were retained and renovated, including the jail cells that were once holding cells for the court house; and the period window frames in the West Gallery. The building now has more than 16,000 square feet of gallery space on three floors.

== Collection ==
The Museum collection includes more than 1,000 Russian icons and related artifacts. The icons range in date from 1450 to the present day and are installed in thematic groupings rather than chronological order. The Museum is particularly proud to display extremely rare Royal Doors that once led to the High Altar of an Orthodox Church in Russia and can be traced back to the 17th century. The Royal Doors are considered to be the "finest pair in the United States."

=== Exhibitions ===
The Museum organizes its own exhibitions from the permanent collection and also hosts visiting exhibitions from other museums and collections. In 2008 and 2010, respectively the Museum co-organized exhibitions of icons from the Tretyakov Gallery and the Andrei Rublev Museum of Early Russian Art and Culture. Because of an embargo of art loans from Russia to the U.S., ongoing since 2011, the Museum has relied on exhibitions originating in the United States.

== The Study Center ==
The Study Center (formerly the Center for Icon Studies) is the research arm of the institution which promotes the study of all aspects of icons and Eastern Christian art and supports research in iconology and iconography—including conservation, historical and comparative studies, and the study of geopolitical, religious, and spiritual aspects of icons. The Study Center publishes the online Journal of Icon Studies. The journal is the only peer-reviewed publication exclusively devoted to Russian icons and related scholarship.

== The Icon Museum and Study Center rebrand ==
In October 2023, the Museum of Russian Icons changed its name to The Icon Museum and Study Center. The new name respects the Museum's history, acknowledges the expansion of the collection to embrace the whole world of Orthodox Christian Art, and points out the path towards the future.

New mission: "The Icon Museum and Study Center illuminates the art of the sacred icon for a global audience. It serves as a leading center for dialogue on icons as a diverse and living tradition. It inspires learning and understanding through innovative exhibitions, programs, and scholarship."
