= Berlin, Massachusetts =

- Town
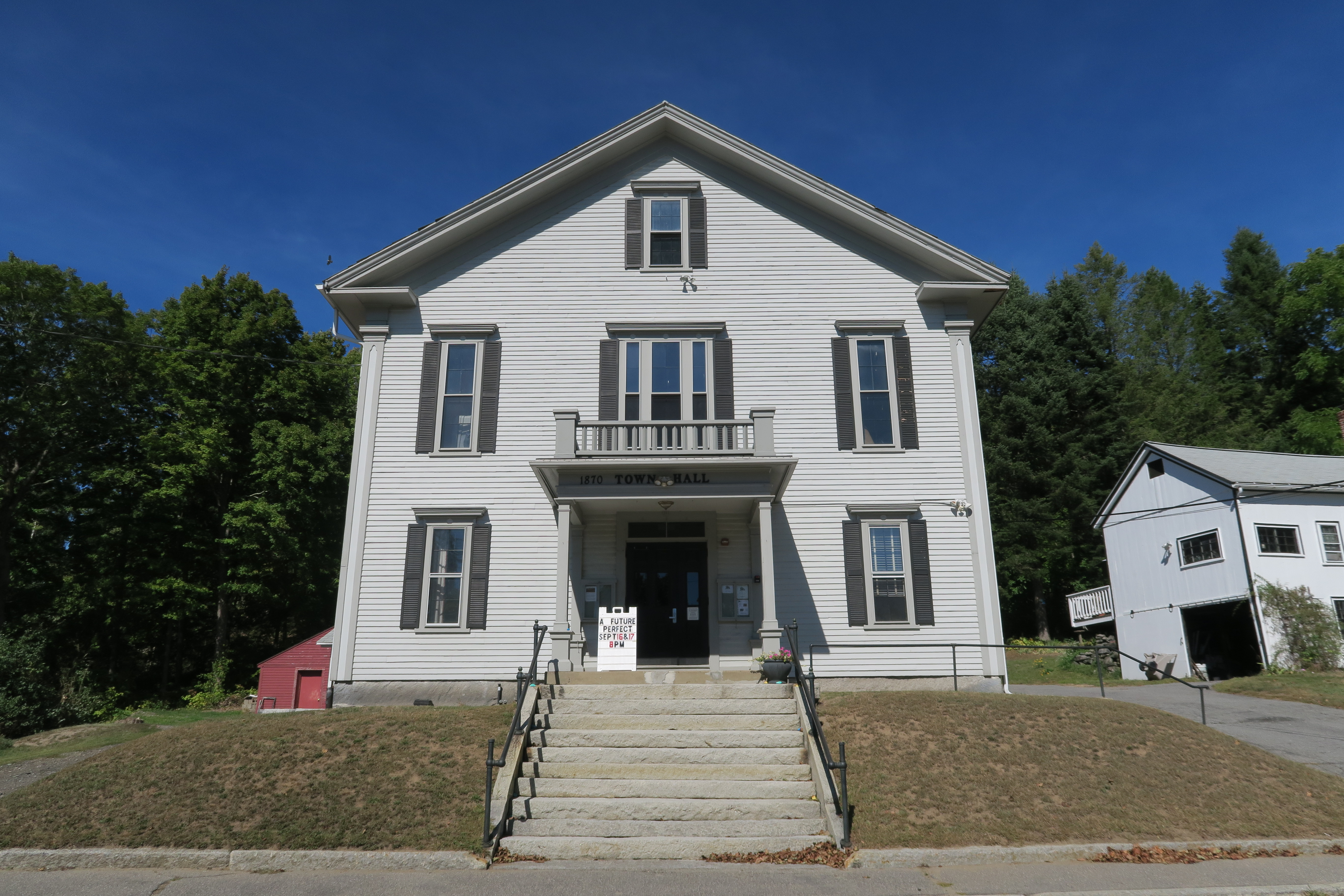
- Berlin Town Hall

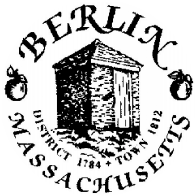
- Flag Seal

- Location in Worcester County and the state of Massachusetts.
- Coordinates: 42°22′52″N 71°38′15″W
- Country: United States
- State: Massachusetts
- County: Worcester
- Settled: 1665
- Incorporated: 1812

Government
  - Type: Open Town Meeting
  - Town Administrator: Kristen L. Rubin
  - Select Board: R. Scott Hawkins, Chair (2026); Margaret Stone, Vice Chair (2027); Lisa J. Wysocki, Clerk (2028)

Area
  - Total: 13.1 sq mi (33.9 km^{2})
  - Land: 12.9 sq mi (33.5 km^{2})
  - Water: 0.15 sq mi (0.4 km^{2})
- Elevation: 299 ft (91 m)

Population (2020)
  - Total: 3,158
  - Density: 244/sq mi (94.3/km^{2})
- Time zone: UTC-5 (Eastern)
  - Summer (DST): UTC-4 (Eastern)
- ZIP Code: 01503
- Area code: 351 / 978
- FIPS code: 25-05490
- GNIS feature ID: 0619476
- Website: www.townofberlin.com

Berlin (/ˈbɜːrlɪn/ BUR-lin) is a town in Worcester County, Massachusetts, United States. The town was first settled in 1665 and incorporated in 1812, and is governed under the open town meeting system. It is located 12 miles (19 km) northeast of Worcester and 29 miles (47 km) west of Boston. The population was 3,158 at the 2020 census.

== History ==
Berlin was home to the Nashaway, and Sachem Sholan deeded part of the town's land to settlers in 1643. Berlin was first settled in 1665. It was named "Berlin" as a district in 1784, and incorporated as a town in 1812. The pronunciation (which unlike the German city emphasizes the first syllable) is believed to date from 1784.

Berlin lies in a low range of hills between the Nashua River and Assabet River valleys. Incorporated in 1812, the town was a residential and agricultural community, growing mixed hay grains and raising cattle. For a period after the Civil War, Berlin was home to a large shoe factory, and shoe manufacturing and lumbering provided non-agrarian jobs. The town soon moved into specialty market gardening, sending 41,000 bunches of asparagus to market in 1885, growing hops and raising chickens. By 1940, 836,600 dozen eggs were produced annually by the poultry farmers of Berlin.

=== Town Hall ===
Berlin's first town house was constructed in 1831 for town meetings and social activities. Community growth necessitated the construction of a new town hall, and construction of the new town hall was started in 1869 and completed in 1870. The lot, a small piece of land facing the Meeting House Common in the center of Berlin, was given to the town by Artemas Barnes.

The Memorial Hall, on the first floor, included photographs of nearly all the local soldiers lost in the Civil War. Later the photos of other Civil War veterans were added until likenesses of nearly 100 local men were collected there. In the 20th century, war dead of World War I, World War II and Vietnam were added.

Barnes Hall, used for social gatherings, and the Selectmen's Room were also on the first floor. In 1904–1905, an addition was built at the back of the building to provide space for a kitchen and the public library on the first floor, and the stage on the second floor. Toilets were added in the 1630s.

In 1998, however, the town hall was moved from the 1870 building to the former home of the elementary school and the school was moved into a new building down the road.

The public library was located in the Town Hall from 1891 until 1928. Barnes Hall was used as a school room in the 1870s. As recently as 1999 the locally produced musical Swinging Into the Millennium was held in the upper hall. Two area contra dance groups have used the hall in recent years. Meetings of Boy and Girl Scouts and local youth baseball and soccer groups also are held in the building.

The project of refurbishing and providing ADA-accessible access to the second floor of the 1870 Town Hall was completed in 2019. The space is available for both Town government use and for rent as a function hall and meeting space.

== Education ==
Berlin shares its school district with neighboring Boylston to form the Berlin-Boylston Regional School District. Students attend Berlin Memorial School from kindergarten to fifth grade, while middle/high school students attend Tahanto Regional High School.

== Geography ==
According to the United States Census Bureau, the town has a total area of 13.1 square miles (34 km^{2}), of which 12.9 square miles (33 km^{2}) is land and 0.2 square miles (0.52 km^{2}), or 1.22%, is water. Berlin is bordered by Hudson and Marlborough to the east, Bolton to the north, Clinton and Boylston to the west, and Northborough to the south. Berlin is the center of population for New England.

Interstate 495 and Route 62 go through Berlin.

== Demographics ==
Historical population
Year	Pop.	±%
1790	512	—
1850	866	+69.1%
1860	1,106	+27.7%
1870	1,016	−8.1%
1880	977	−3.8%
1890	884	−9.5%
1900	1,003	+13.5%
1910	904	−9.9%
1920	868	−4.0%
1930	1,075	+23.8%
1940	1,057	−1.7%
1950	1,349	+27.6%
1960	1,742	+29.1%
1970	2,099	+20.5%
1980	2,215	+5.5%
1990	2,293	+3.5%
2000	2,380	+3.8%
2010	2,866	+20.4%
2020	3,158	+10.2%
2024*	3,479	+10.2%
* = population estimate. Source: United States census records and Population Estimates Program data.

As of the census of 2000, there were 2,380 people, 872 households, and 666 families residing in the town. The population density was 184.1 inhabitants per square mile (71.1/km^{2}). There were 893 housing units at an average density of 69.1 per square mile (26.7/km^{2}). The racial makeup of the town was 97.61% White, 0.17% African American, 0.08% Native American, 0.97% Asian, 0.38% from other races, and 0.80% from two or more races. Hispanic or Latino of any race were 0.50% of the population.

There were 872 households, out of which 34.5% had children under the age of 18 living with them, 64.8% were married couples living together, 8.1% had a female householder with no husband present, and 23.6% were non-families. 18.7% of all households were made up of individuals, and 8.1% had someone living alone who was 65 years of age or older. The average household size was 2.72 and the average family size was 3.13.

In the town, the population was spread out, with 25.0% under the age of 18, 5.3% from 18 to 24, 30.2% from 25 to 44, 27.1% from 45 to 64, and 12.4% who were 65 years of age or older. The median age was 40 years. For every 100 females, there were 99.8 males. For every 100 females age 18 and over, there were 97.3 males.

The median income for a household in the town was $65,667, and the median income for a family was $76,419. Males had a median income of $50,711 versus $32,330 for females. The per capita income for the town was $28,915. About 2.1% of families and 3.9% of the population were below the poverty line, including 6.5% of those under age 18 and 2.7% of those age 65 or over.

== Government ==
Berlin, like many small New England municipalities, uses an open town meeting as its form of government. Day-to-day operations are handled by a town administrator, who is appointed by a three member Select Board.

State government
State Representative(s):	Meghan Kilcoyne (D)
State Senator(s):	Robyn Kennedy (D)
Governor's Councilor(s):	Paul DePalo (D)
Federal government
U.S. Representative(s):	Lori Trahan (D) (3rd District),
U.S. Senators:	Elizabeth Warren (D), Ed Markey (D)

== Notable people ==
- Katherine Bacon, artist, historian
- Donald Featherstone, artist behind the plastic flamingo. Buried in Berlin
- Aaron Feuerstein, businessman, philanthropist, third-generation owner and CEO of Malden Mills in Lawrence, Massachusetts
- Holman K. Wheeler, architect of more than 400 structures in Lynn, Massachusetts
