= Bowers School =

Bowers School may refer to:

- Bowers School (Clinton, Massachusetts), listed on the NRHP in Massachusetts
- Bowers School (Wilburton, Oklahoma), listed on the NRHP in Oklahoma
