= Tahanto Regional High School =

Tahanto Regional Middle/High School

Location
- 1001 Main Street; Boylston, Massachusetts; United States; 42.3712°N 71.7212°W

Information
- Type: Public; Open enrollment
- School district: Berlin-Boylston
- NCES School ID: 250258000160
- Principal: Rich Cameron
- Staff: 46.89 (FTE)
- Grades: 6–12
- Enrollment: 515 (2022-2023)
- Student to teacher ratio: 10.98
- Colors: Green and white
- Athletics conference: Midland Wachusett League
- Mascot: Stag
- Budget: $9,258,859 total $14,778 per pupil (2016)
- Communities served: Boylston, Berlin
- Website: tahanto.bbrsd.org

Tahanto Regional Middle/High School is a public middle school and high school located in Boylston, Massachusetts, United States named after George Tahanto. In the 2012 rankings of U.S. News & World Report Best High Schools, it ranked as number 45 within Massachusetts. The school serves grades 6–12 with a student to teacher ratio of 12.21.

== New construction ==
=== Planning stage ===
Based on a feasibility study performed in 2007 by Berlin-Boylston Regional School District, a recommendation for new construction of Tahanto Regional Middle/High School versus renovation was accepted by the Massachusetts School Building Authority (MSBA) as the more cost-effective option. It was additionally determined by affirmative town vote to move the 6th grade students from the two district elementary schools to the new building to create a "school within a school" approach.

=== Breaking ground ===
The groundbreaking ceremony took place in May 2011 for the new two-story, 126,100 square-foot facility. The new building is designed to serve 560 students from grades 6 through 12. A proposed U-shaped design was planned, with the two wings housing the middle and high schools, and the central core accommodating the auditorium, gymnasium, and cafeteria.

=== New school opens ===
The newly constructed $32.2M building opened its doors to students in grades 6 through 12 on January 3, 2013. The sixth-grade classes made the move from their respective elementary schools the following September. One major focus of the new building was to integrate new technology, such as SMART Boards (whiteboards that can be manipulated digitally), common spaces for students to meet in as groups, and the ability to provide a middle school experience within a larger school setting.

== Academics ==
Courses are offered on four levels: Advanced Placement (AP), Honors, College Preparatory, and Life Skills – Vocational. The class rank is determined using a process determined by weight of class and the cumulative average of all courses completed, with the exception of Physical Education. Graduation requirements include passing scores on the MCAS (Massachusetts Comprehensive Assessment System) in areas of English, Language Arts, Mathematics, and Biology. Students must earn 115 credits to graduate, and must also pass a health course and computer literacy test. Beginning in 2014, students are further required to pass a Technology class.

The Class of 2019 brought high academic achievement to Tahanto. The valedictorian was Mischka Altucher and the salutatorians were Macy Jones and Neil Schaffer.

=== Advanced Placement courses ===
The following AP courses were offered in the 2021 – 2022 academic year:

- AP English Language & Composition
- AP English Literature
- AP Biology
- AP Chemistry
- AP US History
- AP Calculus AB
- AP Calculus BC
- AP Stats
- AP Statistics
- AP European History
- AP World History
- AP Computer Science

== Athletics ==
Tahanto Regional High School received the District E Sportsmanship Award in 2009 and 2021. Presented annually at the MIAA Sportsmanship Summit, this award serves to encourage and promote sportsmanship, integrity and ethics at all levels of interscholastic competition.

In 1999, the boys varsity basketball team had a perfect regular season record of 16-0. They went on to win the Central Mass Division 3 district championship and lost in the state semifinals to Hopkins Academy.

In 2016 the football team, held by West Boylston High School, went 10–2 on the season. West Boylston won the Central Massachusetts District Championship. The team lost to Wahconah in the state semifinals.

In 2017 the Tahanto baseball team went a perfect 20–0 (23–1 in total) in the regular season. The team won the D4 Central Massachusetts District Championship in 2017, beating Sutton 8–7, making this the school's second baseball title, and its first since 1993. The team rallied from a 5–0 deficit, and scored 7 straight. The team later lost to St Mary 4–0 to end their post-season run.

The 2016–2017 school year was the best ever for Tahanto, with them claiming two Central Mass championships.

The Tahanto girls' varsity soccer team was League Champions in 2017, 2018, and 2019 and was Pod Champions in 2020.

The high school offers fall, winter and spring sports programs that include girls' and boys' soccer, field hockey, basketball and softball. Also offered are golf, boys' and girls' lacrosse, cross country, football, cheerleading, baseball, wrestling, tennis, gymnastics, ice hockey, and track and field.

== Motto ==
"Respect All, Fear None"
