= George Tahanto =

Leader of the Nashaway tribe (d. after 1704)

George Tahanto (died after 1704) (also known as Sagamore George or Tohanto) was a leader of the Nashaway tribe within the Pennacook confederation in what is now Massachusetts and New Hampshire. Tahanto was the nephew of Sachem Sholan.

== Early life and background ==
Tahanto was baptized as a Christian, and eventually succeeded his uncle, Sholan, as leader of the Nashaway (Pennacook confederation). The name "Tahanto" may have also been used by an earlier "Tahanto, Sagmore of Pencooke" who was living near what is now Concord, New Hampshire in 1636, when he "granted to William Hilton Seniour & William Hilton Juniour six Miles of Land lying on ye River River Penneconquigg being a rivulette running into Penacooke River." In 1668 Tahanto opposed drunkenness amongst the Pennacook and helped execute a tribe member who committed a murder while intoxicated.

== Conflict with settlers and leaving homeland ==
On January 27, 1699 George Tahanto and his cousin, Wattanummon, went to Boston and ratified a peace treaty with Richard Coote, 1st Earl of Bellomont. Although a large number of Native Americans met at Lake Winnipesaukee in the winter of 1699 to ally with the French and Iroquois, Tahanto and Wattanummon reassured the Massachusetts governor that they were not involved in the alliance and desired peace. In 1700 Tahanto and Wattanummon informed the Massachusetts governor that the Pennecook would not make war on the Mohegan tribe as was rumored. after "George Tohanto and Wattanuman, the two principal Indians of Pennicook" were ordered to go to Boston and report to the government about a possible war plot. In 1701 and 1702 Tahanto deeded large tracts of land to settlers, including the Nashaway homeland around the Waushacum ponds in Sterling, as well as land in what is now known as Boylston, Harvard, Leominster, and Lancaster. In 1702 Tohanto and Wattanummon met with Governor Dudley regarding preventing the Pennacooks from joining a French and Iroqouis alliance. By April 1703 Tahanto reportedly left for Canada, but in June participated with Wattanummon in Governor Joseph Dudley's peace conference at Casco Bay. In 1704 Tahanto was living in Cowass in what is now Newbury, Vermont, when his kinsman Wattanummon provided Tahanto with a hostage from the Deerfield Raid, 10-year-old Stephen Williams, as detailed by Stephen and his father John in their published narratives.

== Legacy ==
Tahanto Regional High School in Boylston, Massachusetts, the Tahanto neighborhood of Harvard, Massachusetts, Tahanto Point in Boylston on the Wachusetts Reservoir, and a locomotive are named after Tahanto. A temperance organization was named after Tahanto due to his opposition to intoxication.
