= Obadiah Hadwen =

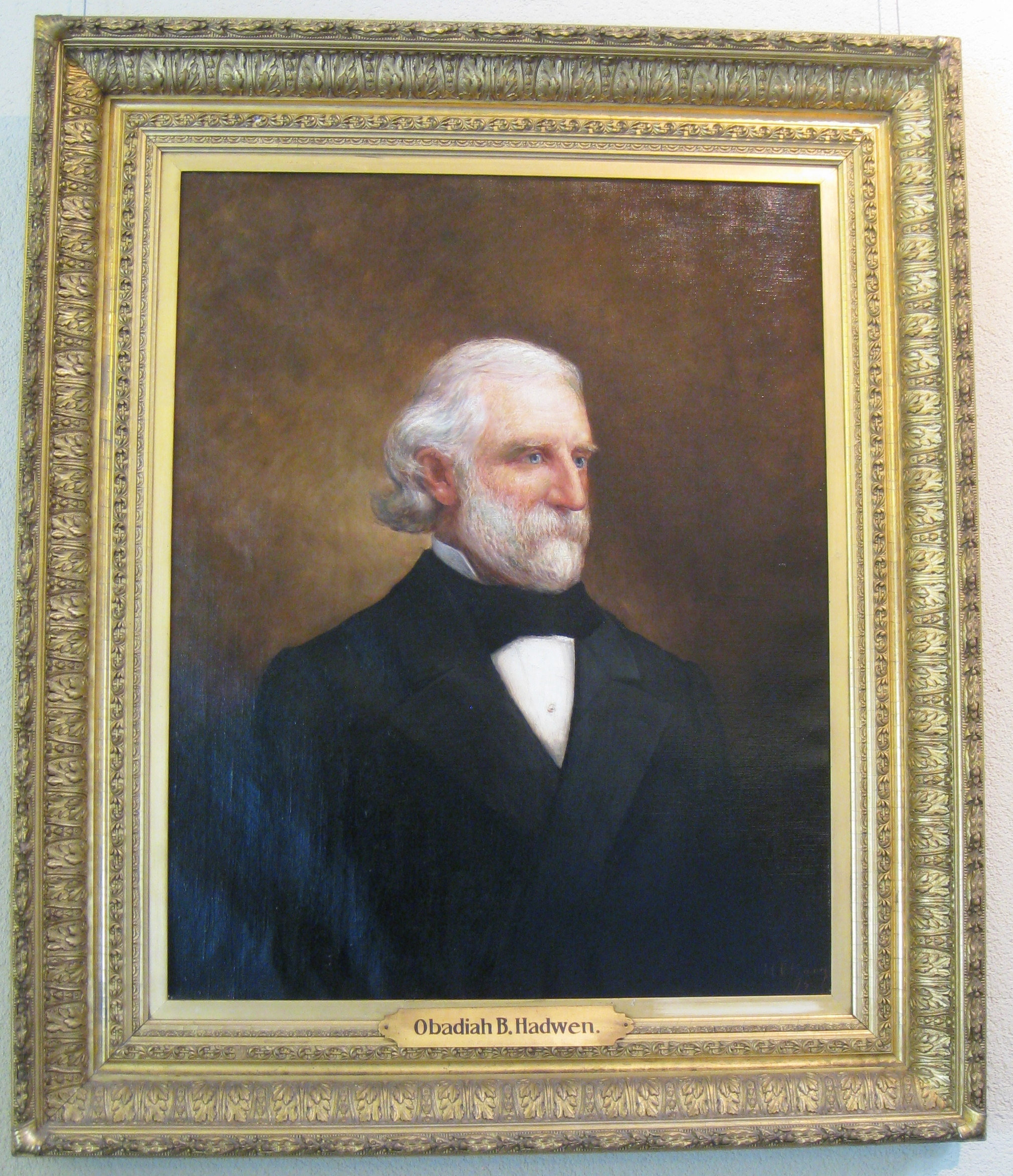
Obadiah Brown Hadwen

Obadiah Brown Hadwen (August 2, 1824 – 1907) was a horticulturist active in Worcester, Massachusetts.

Hadwen was born in Providence, Rhode Island and spent four years at Moses Brown School, then a further four years at the Clinton Grove Institute and one term's instruction at the Worcester County Manual Labor School. In 1844, while still a minor, he became owner of a farm in Worcester, which he improved and enlarged over the years. He became a member of the Worcester County Horticultural Society in 1847, and subsequently served as its trustee, vice president, and president. He was also a trustee and chairman of the Agricultural College at Amherst (now the University of Massachusetts Amherst), as well as commissioner of public parks in Worcester.

Hadwen bequeathed his arboretum to Clark University for the sole purpose of education, with the following words: "Said estate to be forever kept for the purpose of educating students in Agricultural, Historical, and Arboreal knowledge scientific and practical. I adopt this course with the purpose in view of preserving the trees and plants growing thereon, being a portion of my life work, shall be preserved as an Arboretum, and an object lesson to assist students in the education of the science and art of Arboriculture and improving the landscape." He also willed $1000 to Clark University to be invested, with the annual income used "to embellish the University grounds with ornamental trees and plants".

== See also ==
- Hadwen Arboretum, owned by Clark University (at the corner of Lovell and May Street)
- Hadwen Park in Worcester, Massachusetts
