= Berlin-Boylston Regional School District =

School district in Massachusetts, United States

Address
- 215 Main Street Boylston, Worcester County, Massachusetts; United States

District information
- Schools: 3
- NCES District ID: 2502580

Students and staff
- Students: 1112
- Teachers: 93.10 FTE
- Student–teacher ratio: 11.94

Other information
- Website: https://www.bbrsd.org/

The Berlin-Boylston Regional School District consists of one school serving grades 6-12: Tahanto Regional Middle/High School. The school is physically situated in Boylston, Massachusetts, adjacent to the Wachusett Reservoir. The towns of Berlin and Boylston, both located in Worcester County, are the member communities of the district.

Both towns maintain their own K-5 school districts, separate from the regional district. This means there are three legal districts serving the two towns. The towns have a superintendency union agreement by which the three districts share one school superintendent and district-level administration (such as Financial Director and Director of Pupil Personnel Services).

== Administration ==
- Superintendent of Schools: Carol Lynn Costello
  - Tahanto Regional Middle/High School
    - Principal: Diane Tucceri
