= Bowers School (Clinton, Massachusetts) =

- U.S. National Register of Historic Places
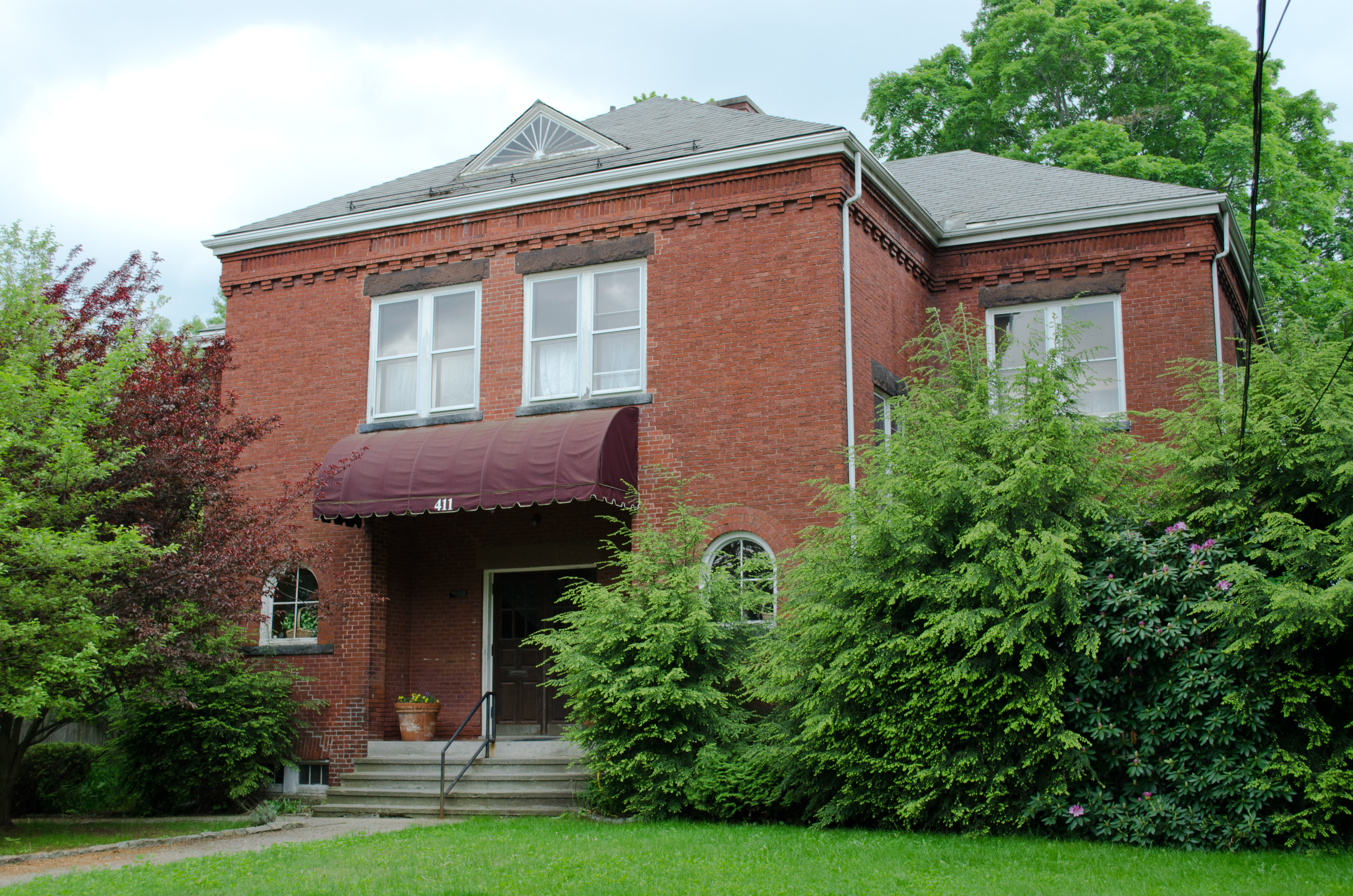

- Location within Massachusetts Location within the United States
- Location: 411 Water St., Clinton, Massachusetts
- Coordinates: 42°25′9″N 71°40′18″W
- Area: less than one acre
- Built: 1892
- Architect: Joshua Thissell
- NRHP reference No.: 83004108
- Added to NRHP: November 10, 1983

The Bowers School is an historic school building on 411 Water Street in Clinton, Massachusetts. The two story brick schoolhouse was built in 1892 to a design by Joshua Thissell. The building was dedicated in honor of Rev. Charles Manning Bowers, a longtime member of the Clinton School Committee. The building was listed on the National Register of Historic Places in 1983. The building now houses residences.

== Description and history ==
The former Bowers School stands in a residential area on Clinton's east side, on the south side of Water Street (a major east-west road), between Schley and Branch Streets. It is a two-story brick structure, with a granite foundation and a roof with a combination of gables and hips. It is basically rectangular, with a projecting hip-roofed entry pavilion on its north (street-facing) facade. The entrance is recessed in a rectangular opening, with round-arch windows on either side of the recess, and two pairs of sash windows above. A small triangular dormer projects from the hip roof. The interior was originally divided into two classrooms on each floor, with stairs in the projecting pavilion and maintenance facilities in the basement.

The first school, a small wood-frame structure, was built on this site in 1847, when the area was still part of Lancaster. Clinton's rapid growth led to its incorporation in 1850, and also its need for enlarged schools. This building was designed by a Joshua Thissell, a local architect and civil engineer, and became a model used by the town in the construction of other schools. Vacant at the time of its National Register listing in 1983, it now houses residences.

== See also ==
- National Register of Historic Places listings in Worcester County, Massachusetts
