= Hadwen Arboretum =

Forest in Worcester, Massachusetts, United States

Coordinates: 42°15′30.5″N 71°49′57.6″W

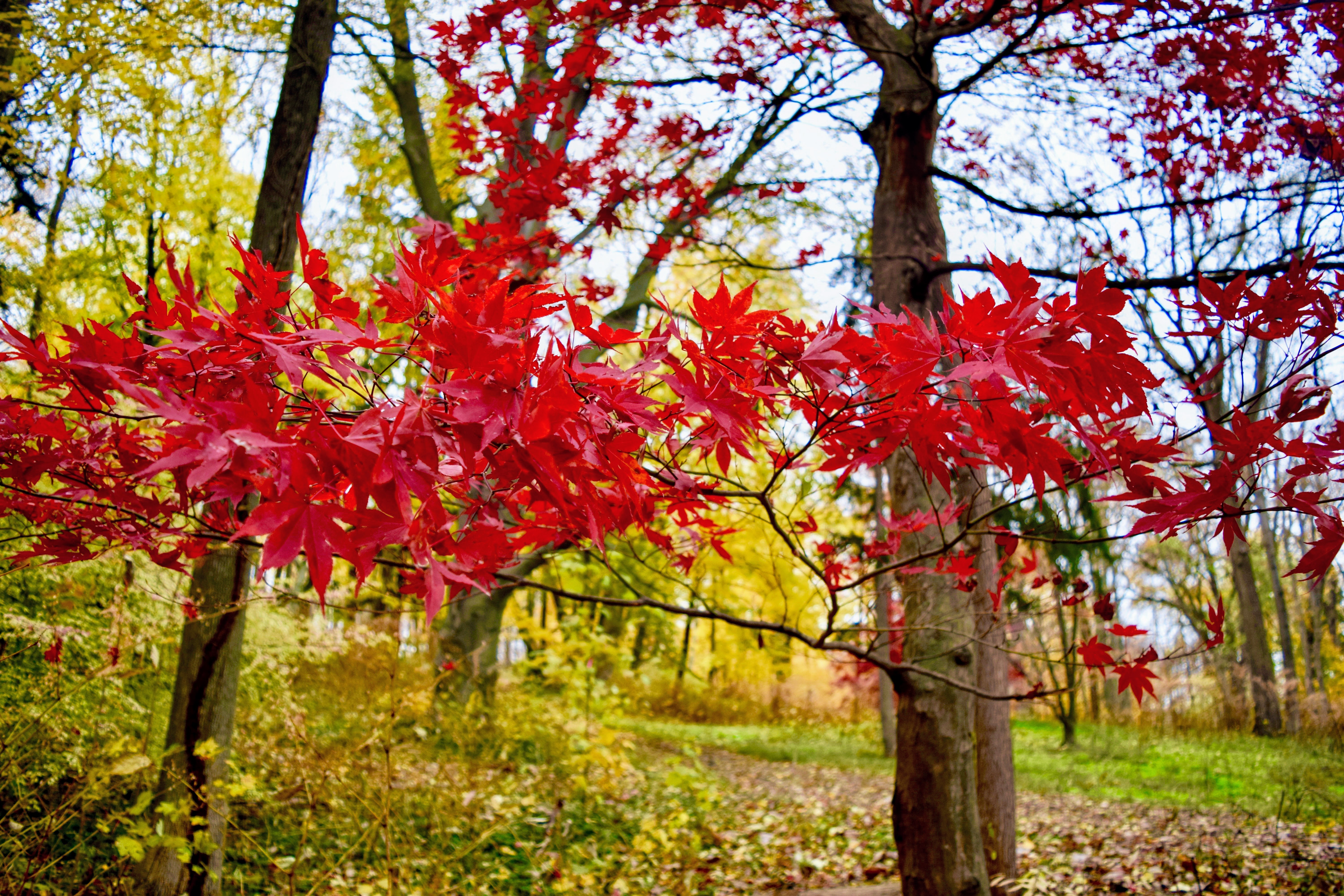
- Japanese maple tree in the arboretum
- Interactive map of Hadwen Arboretum
- Owner: Clark University
- Website: Official website

The Hadwen Arboretum is a 26-acre (11 ha) forest located in the Columbus Park neighborhood of Worcester, Massachusetts. The front entrance is situated on Lovell St. and the arboretum contains many heritage trees that were originally planted by its caretaker Obadiah Hadwen. The property is owned and maintained by nearby Clark University.

The mid-point of the East-West Trail, a 14-mile (23 km) trek connecting 20 green spaces throughout Worcester, is located in the Hadwen Arboretum. There is also a community garden cared for by the Regional Environmental Council.

== History ==
The Hadwen Arboretum is named for its previous owner, Obadiah Hadwen. Hadwen had been Commissioner of the Worcester Department of Parks and Recreation and President of the Worcester County Horticultural Society. After buying the property in 1843, Hadwen built a farmhouse where he ran a vegetable and milk stand. The old foundation still lies alongside the Magnolia Trail. Upon his death in 1907, Hadwen’s land was willed to Clark University. He wished the land to be “forever kept for the purpose of educating students in Agricultural, Historical, and Arboreal knowledge scientific and practical.”

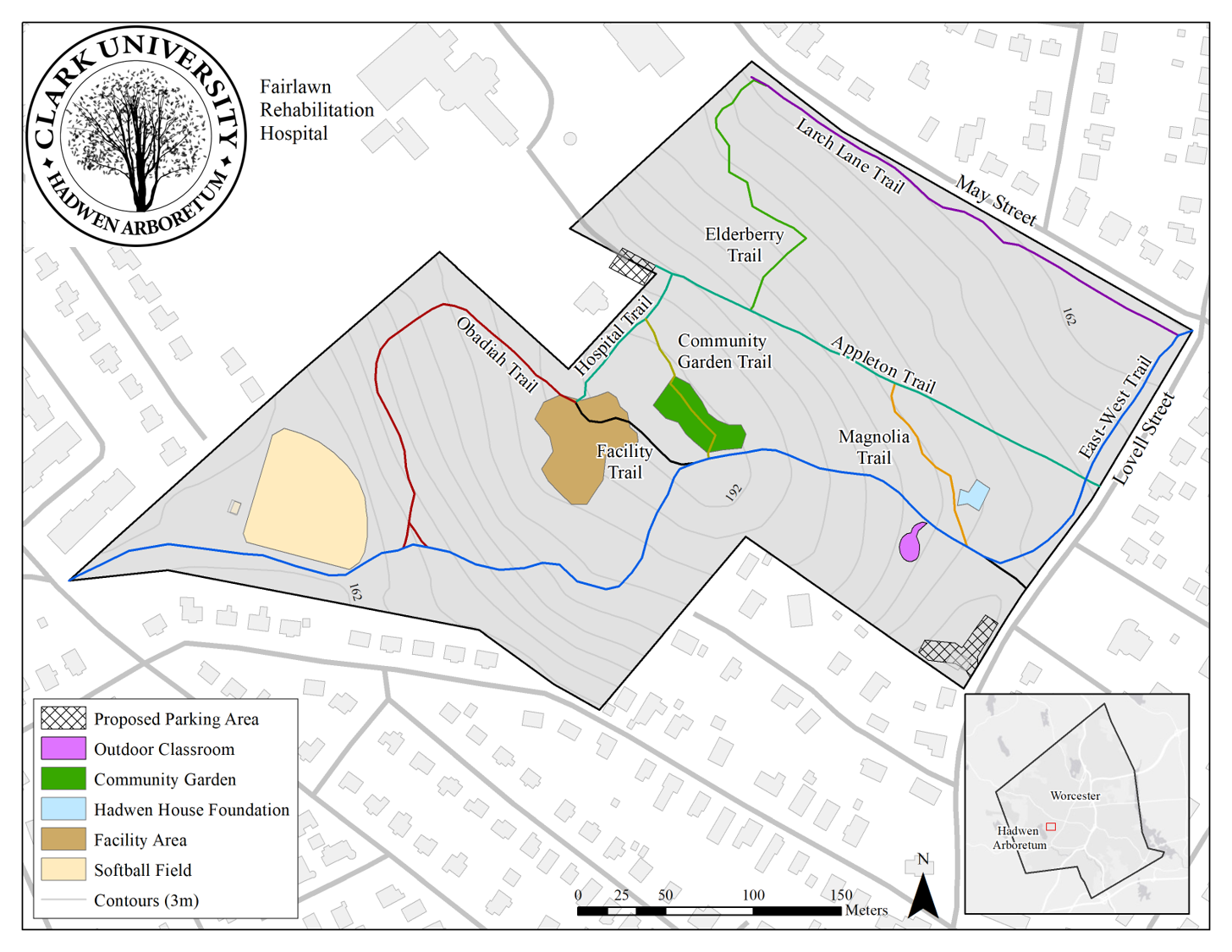
Trail map of the Hadwen Arboretum

In 1931 his daughter, Amie Coes willed a neighbouring plot of land to Clark University, expanding the Arboretum and connecting it to a network of trails by Coes Reservoir. Despite some interest in selling, Clark University continues to own the property after its Board of Trustees firmly decided against it in 1985.

In the absence of management over the years, care and use of the Arboretum diminished to an unwelcoming state. This changed in 2019 when city officials, Clark grounds staff, faculty and students began working together in the ongoing process of revitalizing the Arboretum’s accessibility to the Worcester community. New trails, signage, and an outdoor classroom have been built. Clark has collaborated with the Worcester Tree Initiative at Tower Hill Botanic Garden to plant new trees and shrubs in the Arboretum, likely the first planting to occur in over 50 years.

== Ecology ==
Hadwen planted more than a hundred different varieties of tree species, some of which still survive to this day. Several of these species are rare in New England, including Magnolia acuminata, Cladrastis kentukea, and Sciadopitys. Spring wildflowers, such as blue squill, are also of note. Invasive species have rapidly proliferated and threaten the site's high plant diversity.
