= Stephen Williams (minister) =

American Christian minister (1694–1782)

- Born: May 14, 1694; Deerfield, Massachusetts, U.S.
- Died: June 10, 1782 (aged 88); Massachusetts, U.S.
- Occupation: Congregational minister
- Known for: Ministerial activities Being abducted and later rescued
- Parent(s): John and Eunice Williams

Stephen Williams (1694–1782) was a boy captive of Deerfield, and 1st Congregational minister of Longmeadow, Massachusetts.

== Early years ==
Stephen Williams was the second son born on May 14, 1694, to the Reverend John Williams of Deerfield, Massachusetts, and Eunice Mather Williams, daughter of the Rev. Eleazar Mather of Northampton, Massachusetts.

At the age of nine, Williams was abducted from his home in Deerfield by a raiding party composed roughly of 40 French soldiers, and about 200 Abenaki, Huron and Mohawk Indians, working with the French in Montreal. The raid took place in the early morning hours of February 29, 1704, surprising the inhabitants of the frontier town. Two of Stephen's siblings were killed along with his mother Eunice, who had just given birth and whose “strength of body began to fail her” after falling into the waters of the Green River. Approximately 112 survivors of the Deerfield attack were marched 300 miles (480 km) along the frozen banks of the Connecticut River into Canada, where Stephen was held by his captors briefly at Fort Chambly (Lake Champlain region), and later marched to Cowass (now Newbury, Vermont). His captor, a sagamore named George Tahanto, took Stephen as a servant and “set to various tasks of cutting wood and packing skins and other supplies.” Following the hunting season, the band returned to Canada, where Stephen was briefly reunited with his father, who had obtained a temporary release through Governor de Vaudreuil, along with Stephen's sister Esther and eldest brother Samuel. However, this was short-lived as Stephen was again held captive at Fort St. Francois (east of Montreal) where “he suffered much among the Indians”, and whipped by Jesuits attempting to convert him to Catholicism. In August 1705, Governor Joseph Dudley of Boston arranged a prisoner exchange for Williams and a few others. He sailed to Boston and arrived on November 21, 1705, where he lived with an uncle in Roxbury until his father and brothers were released in the fall of 1706.

== Education ==
Williams was educated in the typical manner of children in Deerfield. His father, Rev. John Williams, also taught Stephen to read the Bible and the books contained in his library. Following his release from captivity, Williams resumed his formal education, and in 1709, was admitted as an undergraduate to Harvard College at the age of sixteen. In a small freshman class of six students, Williams studied a typical curriculum of Greek, Hebrew, logic, ethics, politics, arithmetic, geometry, astronomy, declamation, and divinity. At Harvard, he received scholarships allotted to needy students, and he received help from his great uncle, Cotton Mather, who shared divinity books from his extensive library collection. Following his graduation from Harvard, Williams settled in Hadley, Massachusetts, where “he taught school for sixteen months.” Later in life, he received an honorary Doctor of Divinity from Yale College in 1741, and also from Dartmouth College in 1773.

In 1713, the town of Longmeadow, Massachusetts, had been granted precinct status and separated physically and politically from Springfield, Massachusetts. In addition, by the spring of 1714, Longmeadow had a population of nearly 40 families and petitioned the Massachusetts General Court for the establishment of a meetinghouse. Williams was ordained on October 17, 1716, and began a ministerial career which lasted 66 years. He kept a well-chronicled, diary, which was later transcribed in a grant under the auspices of the Works Progress Administration (WPA) in 1938.

== Marriage and family ==
Stephen Williams married Abigail Davenport of Stamford, Connecticut, on July 3, 1718. They had six sons and two daughters, namely John, Stephen, Eunice, Warham, Samuel, Davenport, Martha, and Nathan. Abigail died on August 26, 1766. Stephen married a second time, on September 6, 1767, to Sarah Burt, a widow of Deacon Nathaniel Burt and daughter of David Chapin of Chicopee, Massachusetts.

== Career ==
Throughout his early years as minister, Williams was confronted with an extraordinary number of issues ranging from nagging physical illnesses, witchcraft, building his permanent house, property disputes, disciplining his slaves and servants, and fear of “Indian mischief.” He was an advocate of the singing of psalms, which was not a widely received practice in the western part of Massachusetts. He also conducted catechisms on a regular basis—a practice which was reserved for “every father to teach his children.” The Puritan church had undergone a transformative change in the way its membership was defined. Prior to the synod of 1662, full membership in New England Congregationalism could only be reached by the approval of first-generation adults who decided on the eligibility of its congregation. The half-way covenant, which bound the Longmeadow church, allowed the children of these full members to be admitted provided that they follow the precepts of the religion by receiving the sacrament of baptism and through the “ownership of the covenant” by the ritual of confession of faith. If a member of the church engaged in some form of “scandalous transgression”, he might be ‘regenerated’ as a member, providing that he “makes satisfaction.” By March 1732, Williams began preaching publicly from Scripture, which by his own admission “angered some townspeople”, despite the idea that this practice was beginning to flourish in nearby Westfield (Rev. Nehemiah Bull). In fact, Longmeadow would not allow a pulpit Bible until the nineteenth century.

== The Breck affair ==
Following the death of Reverend Daniel Brewer of Springfield in 1734, Stephen Williams often filled in for the vacant ministry. By August 1734, Robert Breck, a 21-year-old from Marlborough, Massachusetts, had been accepted by the deacons to take over the church. Following his graduation from Harvard, he was reported by Reverend Thomas Clap of Windham, Connecticut, of having Arminian ideas—too radical for the established Congregational church. Stephen Williams’ brother, Eleazar, minister of Mansfield, Connecticut, in a letter to the Hampshire Association of Ministers, concurred with Clap's opinion that Breck was not a suitable choice. Stephen Williams was a friend of Breck, and though disagreeing with his theology, had invited him to preach in Longmeadow only one year earlier. For over a year, the controversy continued with Williams attempting to “reconcile the Springfield church, Breck, and the Association. The battle came to a climax during a Hampshire Association meeting, where charges were leveled at Breck by Thomas Clap, who accused him of preaching heretical and subversive ideas. Breck was arrested by a town constable, but was released on bail. The heart of the matter was not over theology, but over a political issue of “the individual church against an association of ministers. Eventually the charges were dropped and Breck was ordained in January 1736. Although Stephen Williams was not directly harmed by defending Breck’s ordination, he cast his lot with the other ‘river gods’ along political lines. In a gesture of reconciliation, Breck called upon Williams to preside at his wedding, and toward the end of William's life, Breck was summoned by Williams to preach his funeral sermon.

== The Great Awakening ==
The radical idea of justification by faith alone was beginning to spread throughout the Connecticut River Valley and challenged the orthodoxy of the “Old Light” ministers from Boston, who continued to believe in the Calvinist idea of salvation owing to absolute predestination. This opened the door to a spontaneous frontier revival movement, where the individual had an impact upon his/her own salvation. Perry Miller described it as a “Lockean psychology because word spread about how ordinary people could acquire conversion merely through an idea derived from experience.” Stephen Williams’ diaries are peppered with accounts of his cousin Jonathan Edwards, (who shared blood lines along their mother's side), being invited to preach in Longmeadow, and Williams travelling to East Windsor, Connecticut, to do the same for Edwards’ father Timothy. In a glimpse of what was to become the First Great Awakening (1740–1743), twenty-four year old Stephen Williams witnessed the ‘harvest of souls’ after observing his grandfather, the Rev. Solomon Stoddard, preaching about "the Lord’s Great Goodness."

By March 1734, Stephen Williams travel had become more extensive as he “preached at Enfield (an ye Rev. Mr. Reynolds preached here). I hope and pray such interchanging may be of reall service to our people as well as ease to us de [sic:deity].” There is little doubt that Stephen Williams became an ardent supporter of religious revivalism. Following a dramatic and emotional sermon, his son Samuel came to him weeping and asking for prayers, leading Williams to send for a doctor, fearing for his son's mental and physical condition. Emotional unrest in the village coincided with an increase in membership as Williams noted, “Five persons joined to your Church this day.” However, by June 1734, a number of suicides were recorded following the emotional deliverances of ministers in the valley. Jonathan Edwards’ uncle, Joseph Hawley of Northampton, cut his own throat presumably after being “thrown into despondency by Edward’s preaching.” In Longmeadow, where Stephen Williams was “preaching upon death” in his Sabbath morning sermon on June 13, 1735, “Nathaniel Burt 2nd cut his own throat” following the afternoon exercises. A larger, more zealous revival took hold in the 1740s, mostly embraced by young people actively listening to advice, avoiding loitering, eschewing the taverns, and avoiding ‘lewd practices’, (defined as company-keeping, frolicking, and social gatherings). At this time, George Whitefield, an evangelical minister from England, visited Williams, Edwards, and others on many occasions. Whitefield was invited to the Williams’ home in Longmeadow and to preach at the meetinghouse. On October 20, Williams travelled with Whitefield to Westfield, Massachusetts, and Suffield, Connecticut, where he heard him “preach to great auditory-he is a warm fervent preacher- has an inimitable faculty of touching ye affections & passions.” Religious conversion now seemed to parallel Edwards’ view of being “centered in the emotions” as unorthodox expressions of public tears, laughter, shouting, and shaking became commonplace. On July 8, 1741, Williams was accompanied by ‘new light’ ministers Eleazar Wheelock (Lebanon, Connecticut) and Joseph Meacham (Coventry, Connecticut) to hear the legendary “Sinners in the hands of an angry God sermon”, delivered by Jonathan Edwards. Williams described the sermon as “most awakening” accompanied by a great moaning & crying out throughout ye whole house...so that ye minister was obliged to desist..shrieks and crys were piercing & amazing." In all, about forty new members were admitted to the Longmeadow church during the height of the Great Awakening (1741–1742).

== Later years ==
In 1745, Massachusetts Governor William Shirley asked Williams to join Colonel Joseph Dwight’s regiment as a chaplain during King George’s War. Combat was limited to fighting at Louisberg, the British outpost on Cape Breton Isle. Williams served from July to November 1745, became ill with dysentery at the camp, and was returned to Boston, where he convalesced for three months. During the French and Indian War (1755–1763), Stephen Williams was again summoned to serve as chaplain in July 1755, and was stationed at Lake Champlain at Fort Crown Point. In September, his regiment was attacked by French and Indians. Later Williams was asked by Brigadier General Joseph Dwight to be the chaplain for an expedition to Lake George. After the British victory was secured, Williams contracted diarrhoea and jaundice and returned home to Longmeadow. Williams demanded and received full back pay for his time served in Nova Scotia during the war. Reflecting upon the new prosperity of the 1750s, Williams commented “Many new shoe buckles & fine silk scarves at the Assembly” and added that none of the congregation seemed “to be growing thinly about the bodies.”

At the beginning of the Revolutionary War, Williams took a Royalist stance, angering many in the town. However, he did give blessings to the militia heading for Lexington and Concord in April 1775. Longmeadow, itself, was a quartering town for troops heading north and south during the Revolution, yet a small group of radicals dressed as Indians drew Williams’ condemnation. The revolutionaries staged their own ‘tea party’ by ransacking the general store of ‘Marchant’ Colton, spilling out flour, sugar, and nails. Toward the end of the war, Williams became more sympathetic toward the American cause of liberty, and often prayed for the local men involved in the battles with the British. Until the day he died on June 10, 1782, Stephen Williams “..continued to preach his Sunday sermons, deliver the Sacrament and the weekly lecture, visit the infirm and counsel the young.”

== Publications ==
Williams, John. The Redeemed Captive Returning to Zion, or A Faithful History of Remarkable Occurrences of Mr. John Williams (Northampton: Hopkins, Bridgman, and Company, 1853)

Williams, Reverend Stephen. "Diaries of Reverend Williams:1716-1782 (Longmeadow: MA: Board of Selectmen, Project#21276 Under the auspices of the Works Progress Administration, 1938)

Williams, Stephen West. "The genealogy and history of the family of Williams in America..." (Greenfield, MA.:Merriam & Mirick, 1847)

== See also ==
- List of kidnappings
- List of solved missing person cases
