= Boylston, Massachusetts =

- Town
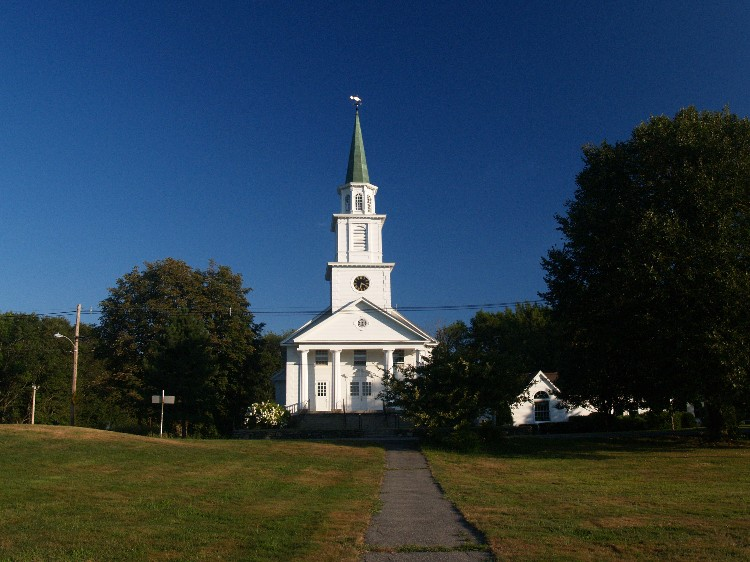
- Boylston Town Common

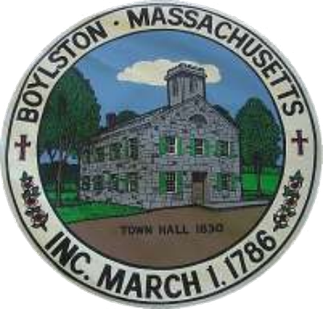
- Flag Seal

- Location in Worcester County and the state of Massachusetts.
- Coordinates: 42°20′3.14″N 71°44′17.51″W
- Country: United States
- State: Massachusetts
- County: Worcester
- Settled: 1705
- Incorporated: 1786
- Named after: Ward Nicholas Boylston

Government
  - Type: Open town meeting
  - Town Administrator: Patrick Sharron

Area
  - Total: 19.7 sq mi (51.0 km^{2})
  - Land: 16.0 sq mi (41.5 km^{2})
  - Water: 3.6 sq mi (9.4 km^{2})
- Elevation: 443 ft (135 m)

Population (2020)
  - Total: 4,849
  - Density: 303/sq mi (117/km^{2})
- Time zone: UTC−5 (Eastern)
  - Summer (DST): Eastern
- ZIP Code: 01505
- Area code: 508/774
- FIPS code: 25-07525
- GNIS feature ID: 0619478
- Website: www.boylston-ma.gov

Boylston is a town in Worcester County, Massachusetts, United States. The population was 4,849 at the 2020 census.

== History ==
Boylston was first settled by Europeans around 1706 in the northern part of the present-day town, most notably by the Sawyer family after Nashaway sachems Sholan and George Tahanto deeded the land. In 1697, the residents petitioned to form a local town and government, but the British colonial Governor of Massachusetts denied their request since he wanted to keep the number of towns to a minimum and to restrict popular representation.

A meeting house was built in 1743, and the Reverend Ebenezer Morse, ordained in October 1743, was the first minister in charge of the church.

The town was made up of a large part of land from Shrewsbury and the remainder from Lancaster and was known as the North Parish of Shrewsbury from 1742 until 1786, when it was incorporated as Boylston.

Boylston was named after Ward Nicholas Boylston (1747–1828), a benefactor of the town. The fund he set up in 1797 finally accumulated $1,450, which was used to build the town hall and school building.

The residents formerly made a living from agriculture, and erected mills on the Nashua River, until the construction of Wachusett Reservoir terminated their operation.

== Geography ==
According to the United States Census Bureau, the town has a total area of 19.7 square miles (51 km^{2}), of which 16.0 square miles (41 km^{2}) is land and 3.6 square miles (9.3 km^{2}), or 18.50%, is water.

With a population of nearly 4400 residents, the town is predominantly a residential community. The Wachusett Reservoir, part of the water supply system managed by the Massachusetts Water Resources Authority for Greater Boston area, lies in the northwestern part of the town and covers about 5,000 acres (20 km^{2}) of land. The town maintains approximately 45 miles (72 km) of roadway, has 9 miles (14 km) of sidewalks, and has its own Municipal Light Department, Water District, and volunteer fire and ambulance service.

The town of Boylston is bordered by the towns of Shrewsbury, West Boylston, Sterling, Clinton, Berlin, and Northborough.

== Demographics ==
Historical population
Year	Pop.	±%
1790	839	—
1850	918	+9.4%
1860	929	+1.2%
1870	800	−13.9%
1880	854	+6.7%
1890	770	−9.8%
1900	1,364	+77.1%
1910	714	−47.7%
1920	794	+11.2%
1930	1,097	+38.2%
1940	1,388	+26.5%
1950	1,700	+22.5%
1960	2,367	+39.2%
1970	2,774	+17.2%
1980	3,470	+25.1%
1990	3,517	+1.4%
2000	4,008	+14.0%
2010	4,355	+8.7%
2020	4,849	+11.3%
2023*	4,972	+2.5%
* = population estimate. Source: United States census records and Population Estimates Program data.

As of the 2000 census, there were 4,008 people, 1,573 households, and 1,140 families residing in the town. The population density was 250.0 inhabitants per square mile (96.5/km^{2}). There were 1,606 housing units at an average density of 100.2 per square mile (38.7/km^{2}). The racial makeup of the town was 96.71% White, 0.67% African American, 0.22% Native American, 1.37% Asian, 0.25% from other races, and 0.77% from two or more races. Hispanic or Latino of any race were 0.57% of the population.

There were 1,573 households, out of which 33.2% had children under the age of 18 living with them, 63.9% were married couples living together, 6.6% had a female householder with no husband present, and 27.5% were non-families. 22.3% of all households were made up of individuals, and 8.6% had someone living alone who was 65 years of age or older. The average household size was 2.55 and the average family size was 3.02.

In the town, the population was spread out, with 24.3% under the age of 18, 4.4% from 18 to 24, 31.3% from 25 to 44, 27.8% from 45 to 64, and 12.3% who were 65 years of age or older. The median age was 40 years. For every 100 females, there were 99.0 males. For every 100 females age 18 and over, there were 96.5 males.

The median income for a household in the town was $67,703, and the median income for a family was $77,604. Males had a median income of $56,019 versus $43,277 for females. The per capita income for the town was $32,274. About 2.4% of families and 2.8% of the population were below the poverty line, including 0.5% of those under age 18 and 9.8% of those age 65 or over.

== Government ==
State government
State Representative(s):	Harold P. Naughton, Jr (D)
State Senator(s):	Harriette L. Chandler (D, 1st Worcester district)
Governor's Councilor(s):	Jen Caissie (R)
Federal government
U.S. Representative(s):	James P. McGovern (D-2nd District),
U.S. Senators:	Elizabeth Warren (D), Ed Markey (D)

== Library ==
The Boylston Public Library was established in 1880. In fiscal year 2008, the town of Boylston spent 1.35% ($152,562) of its budget on its public library—some $35 per person.

== Education ==
Boylston currently operates a junior-senior high school with the neighboring town of Berlin, called the Tahanto Regional Middle/High School. It is part of the Berlin-Boylston Regional School District. The town is also home to the Tower Hill Botanic Garden, operated by the Worcester County Horticultural Society, which offers adult education classes in horticulture, cooking, and gardening.

The school mascot is a stag, and the teams' colors are white and green.

== Notable residents ==
- Jeff Fuller (born 1957) - racing driver
- Kevin Manion (born 1972) - NASCAR race-winning crew chief

== Photos ==
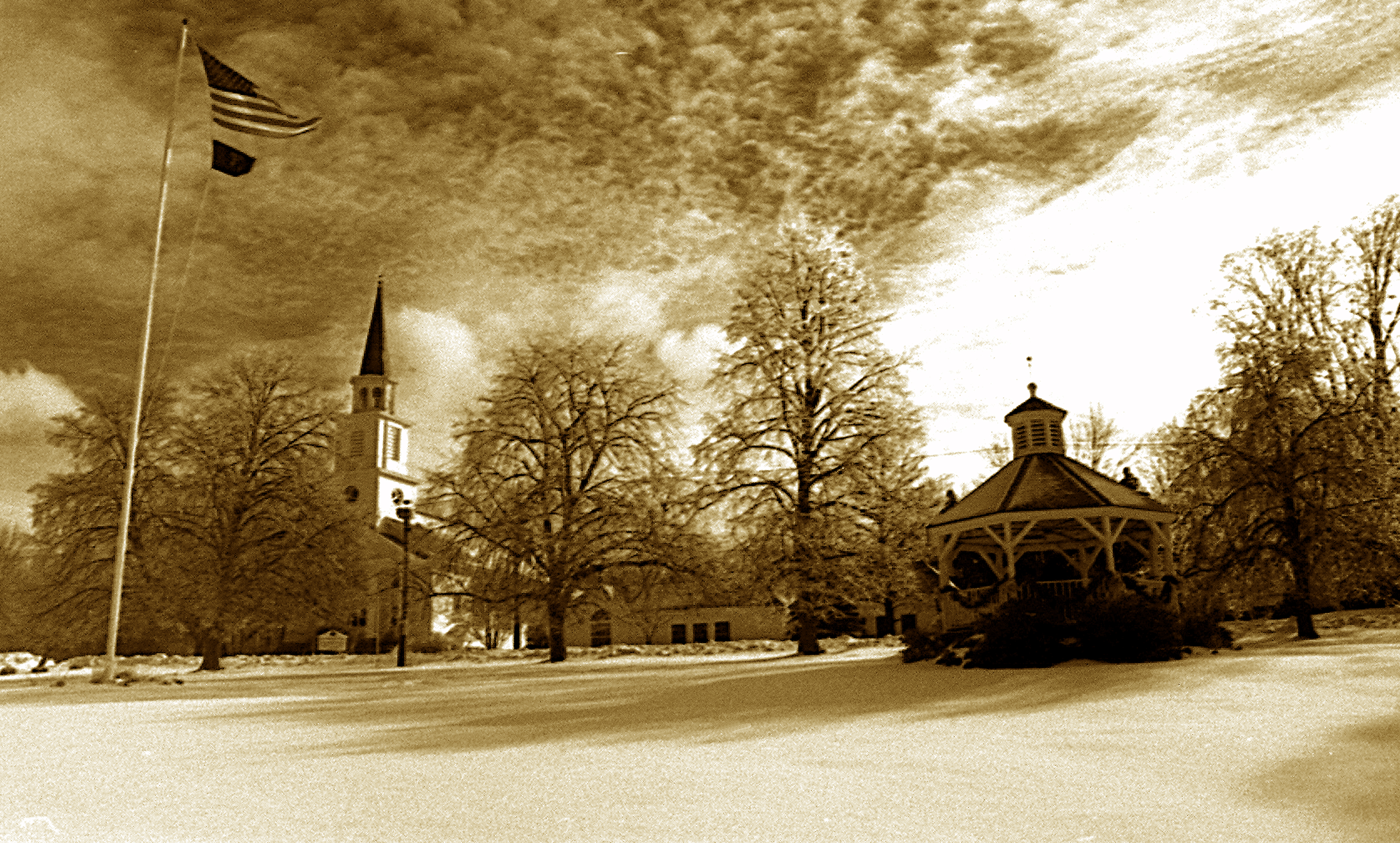
Boylston Commons, Winter
