= New England Botanic Garden =

Botanic garden in Boylston, Massachusetts

Coordinates: 42.3619°N 71.7267°W

New England Botanic Garden at Tower Hill
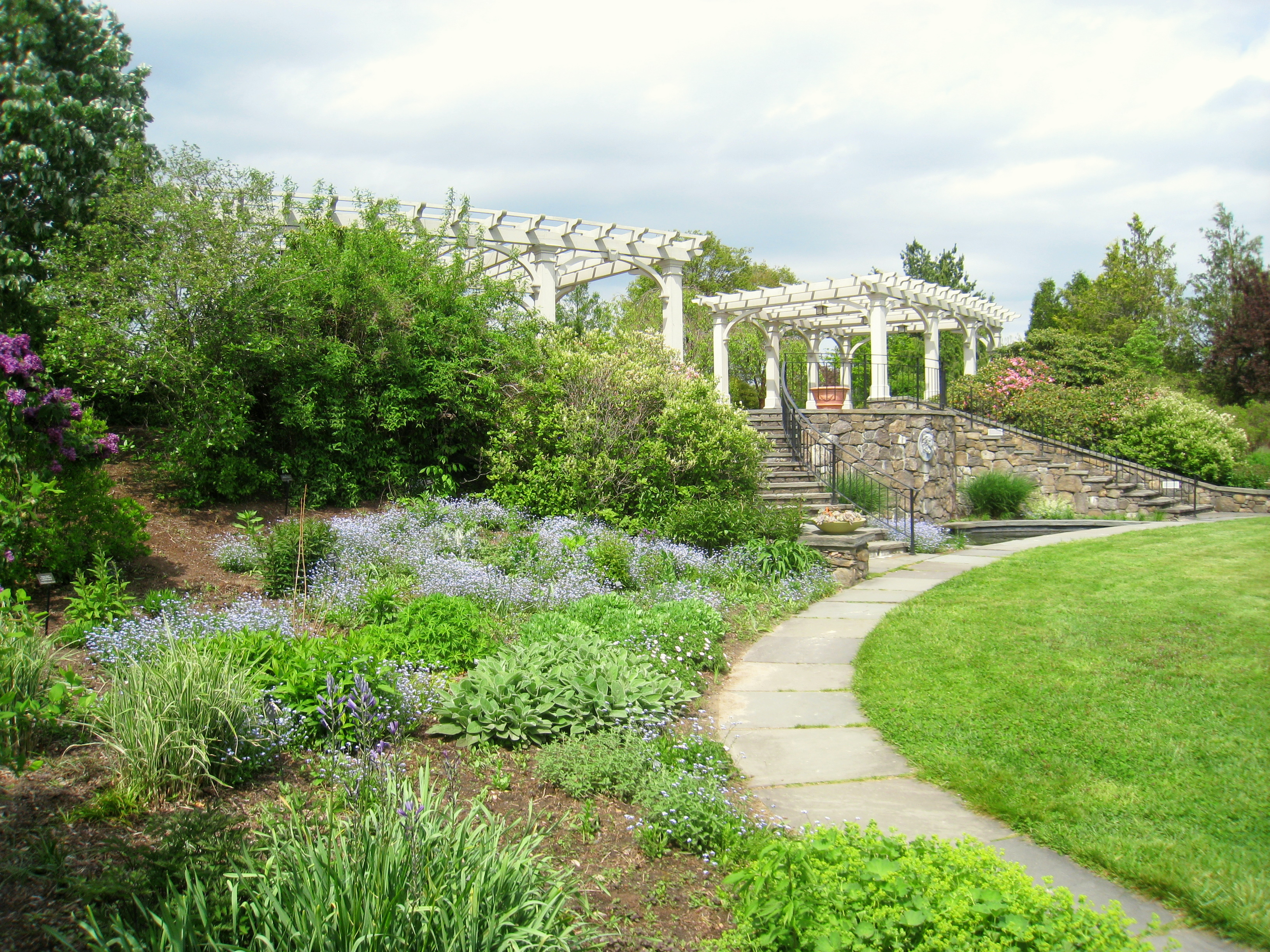
- Secret Garden
- Former name: Tower Hill Botanic Garden
- Established: 1986
- Location: 11 French Drive; Boylston, MA
- Type: Botanic Garden
- Parking: On site (no charge)
- Website: www.nebg.org

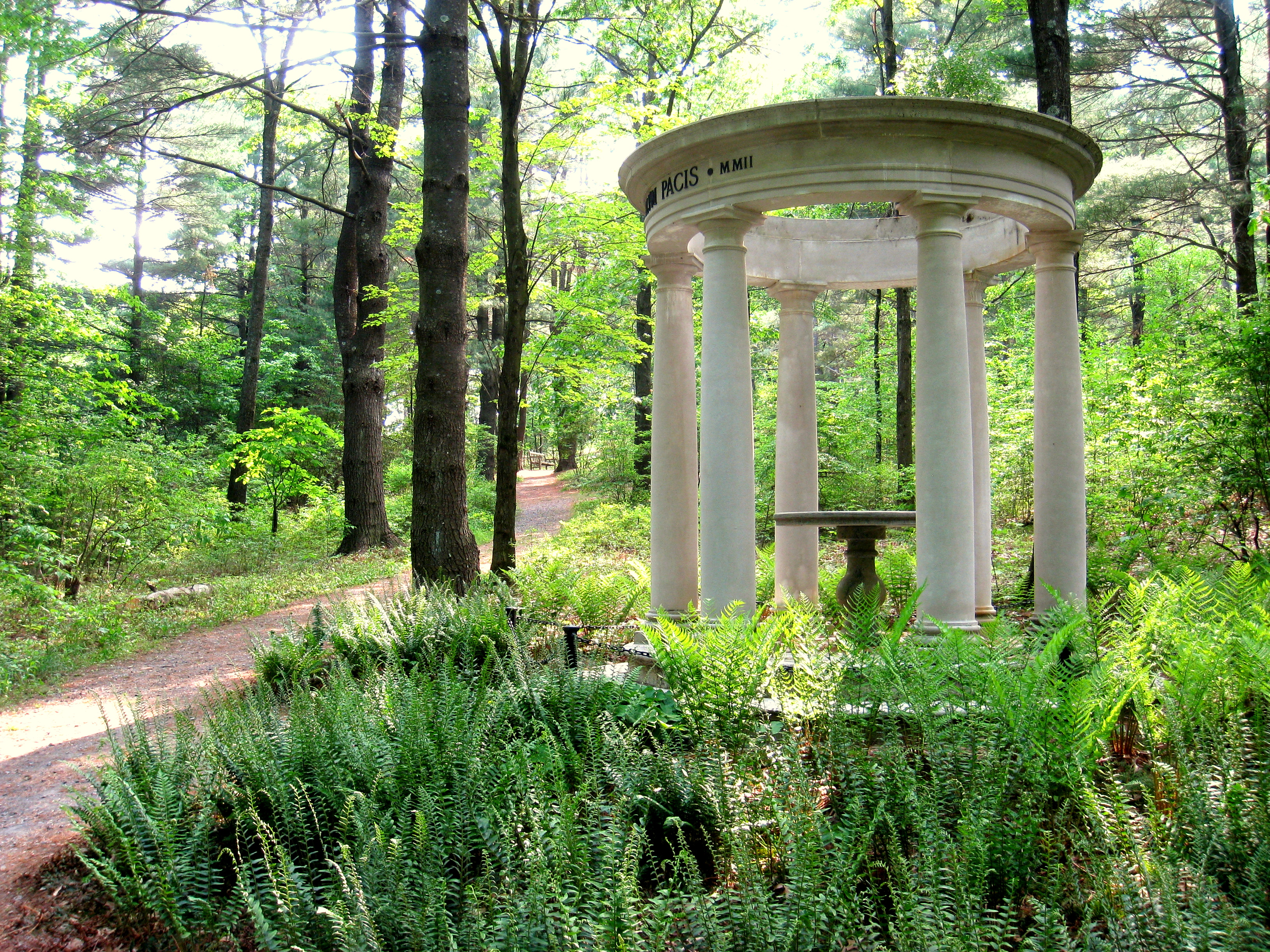
Temple of Peace

New England Botanic Garden at Tower Hill is a 200-acre four season botanic garden located in Boylston, Massachusetts, approximately 10 miles (16 km) north of central Worcester in Worcester County, Massachusetts. The garden features 18 distinct garden spaces, preserved woodlands, and miles of walking trails. More than 200,000 people visit New England Botanic Garden at Tower Hill each year to explore gardens and conservatories that showcase diverse collections of native, ornamental, tropical, rare, and edible plants.

== History ==
New England Botanic Garden at Tower Hill, formerly known as Tower Hill Botanic Garden, was founded in 1986 on the former Tower Hill Farm by the Worcester County Horticultural Society (WCHS), the third oldest active horticultural society in the U.S. Established in 1842, WCHS grew to be a cornerstone institution in the central Massachusetts region. For decades, from its downtown Worcester headquarters, the society held exhibitions that celebrated Worcester County's thriving agricultural community. By the 1940s, however, the large country estates that had supported such shows began to diminish and exhibition entries declined. In response, WCHS set out to cultivate its own permanent botanic garden for the public to enjoy.

== Features ==
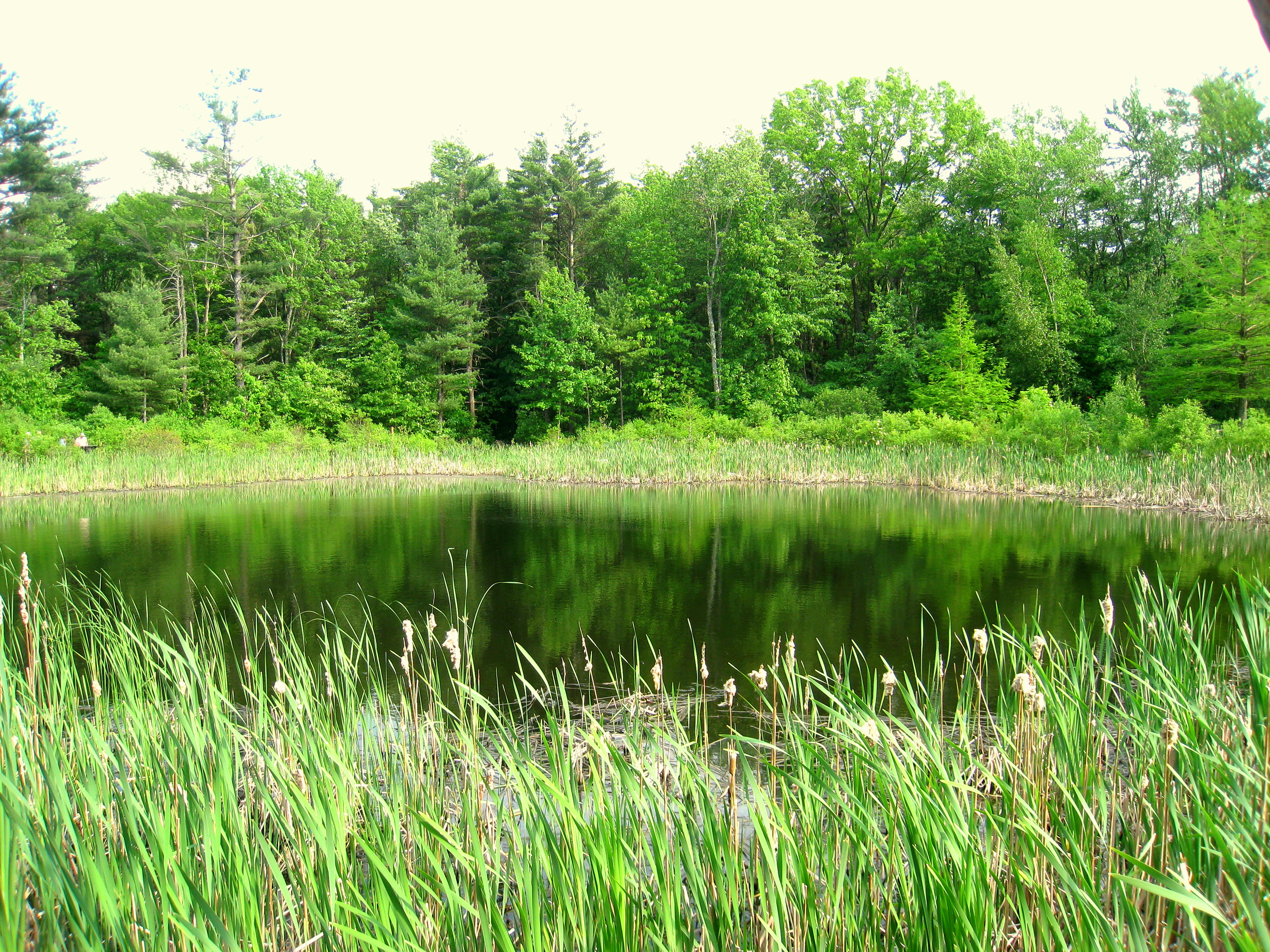
Wildlife Refuge Pond

The Stoddard Education and Visitors Center is the hub for visitor activities at New England Botanic Garden at Tower Hill. The complex houses the Farmer & The Fork café and Garden Shop, as well as space for special events, art exhibitions, educational classes and workshops, concerts, and private event rentals that include weddings and corporate events. There are views of Mount Wachusett and the Wachusett Reservoir from the café terrace and the Reservoir Room.

=== Gardens and grounds ===
New England Botanic Garden at Tower Hill features a variety of themed specialty gardens and focused plant collections. Sections include:

- The Ramble : This "whimsical" woodland garden opened in 2022. Designed for families, it includes interactive play features and is landscaped with hundreds of perennials, shrubs, trees, and a pond of seasonal aquatic plants.
- The Court: A Garden Within Reach: This universally accessible garden features raised beds, living walls, and plants selected for their multisensory appeal.
- The Lawn Garden – A variety of different species and cultivars of trees and shrubs, along with thousands of spring bulbs and summer blooming perennials, make this garden space an attraction year-round.
- Inner Park: This 5-acre garden space is New England Botanic Garden at Tower Hill's premier native plant garden. It offers examples of how to create naturalistic gardens with a focus on an everblooming display that has interest in all seasons.
- Vegetable Garden: The oldest garden at New England Botanic Garden at Tower Hill, this space features sustainably grown heirloom vegetables and herbs planted in designs "to inspire the home gardener".
- Orangerie and Limonaia – These subtropical conservatories house collections of non-hardy plants such as citrus, palms, agave, camellias, orchids, and more.
- Frank L. Harrington Sr. Apple Orchard: The orchard displays the Davenport Collection of heirloom apples, 250 apple trees representing 119 pre-20th century heritage apple varieties. In 2018, New England Botanic Garden began a restoration project to replace the trees in this collection, which had reached the end of their intended lifespans and were facing increased disease pressure. Using scionwood collected from trees in the Davenport Collection, Fedco Trees in Maine helped propagate new saplings which were planted at the Garden in the spring of 2021.
- Field of Daffodils: This expansive garden space attracts visitors from around the region each spring. It features more than 25,000 daffodil bulbs that, depending on the weather, reach “peak bloom” around the third week of April.

== Current situation ==
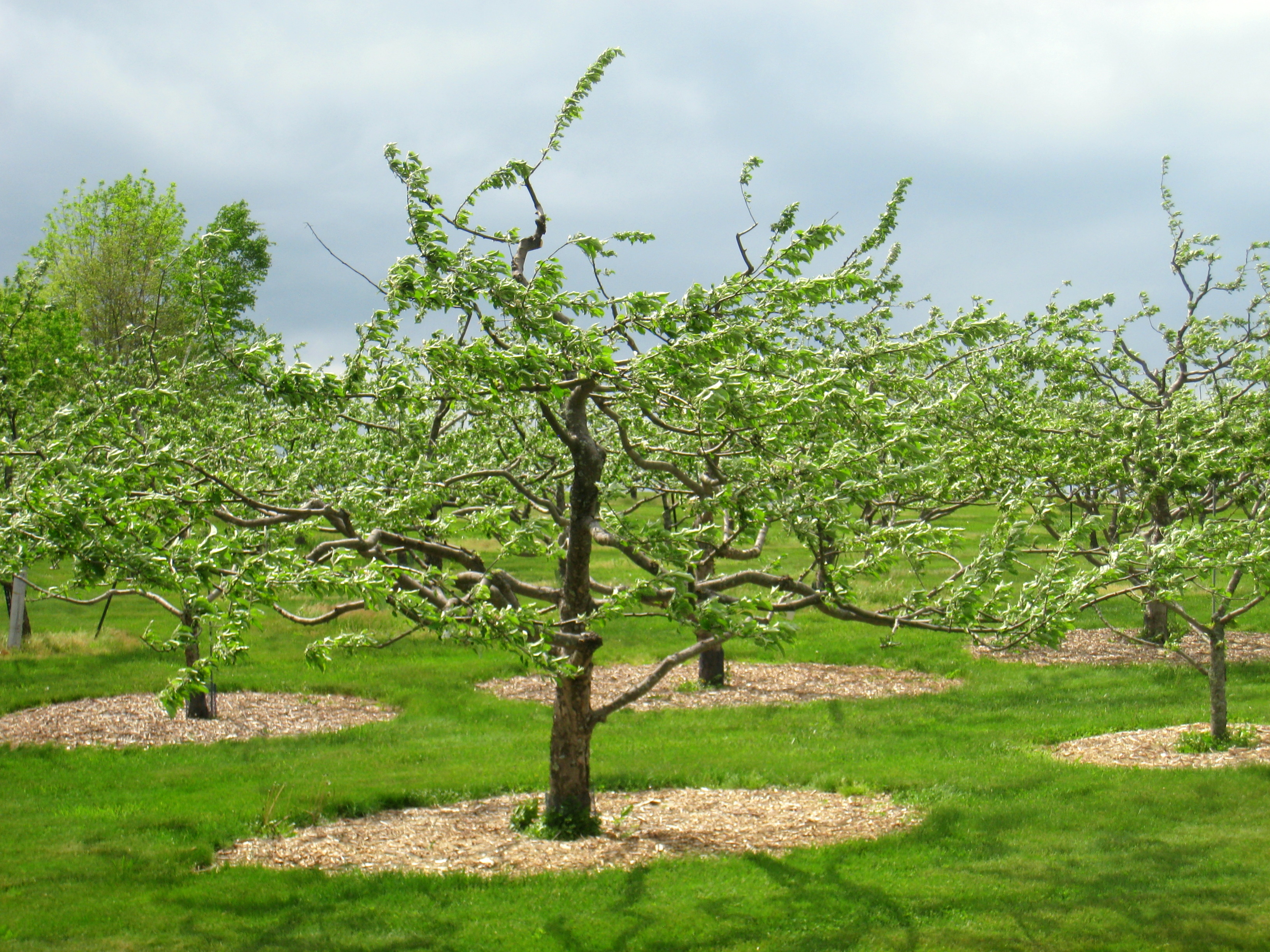
Harrington Apple Orchard

New England Botanic Garden at Tower Hill has grown dramatically in the decades since its establishment.

Just between 2017 and 2023, the organization expanded its footprint by more than 50 acres, increased accessibility of its spaces through a universal design entry way, added more accessible, ADA-compliant pathways throughout formal garden spaces, and expanded educational offerings. Roughly 15,000 adults, youth, and children attend a class or workshop at New England Botanic Garden at Tower Hill each year. More than 250 people support the Garden as volunteers.

In 2022, New England Botanic Garden at Tower Hill became the first botanic garden in the U.S. to be certified a Green Zone by the American Green Zone Alliance for the organization's commitment to sustainability and its ongoing efforts to decarbonize its horticulture operations. In 2023, New England Botanic Garden at Tower Hill was voted “Top Botanic Garden in the U.S.” by TravelAwaits.

== See also ==
- Botanical gardens in Massachusetts
- List of botanical gardens in the United States
- Tourist attractions in Worcester County, Massachusetts
