= Bigelow Carpet Mill =

- U.S. National Register of Historic Places
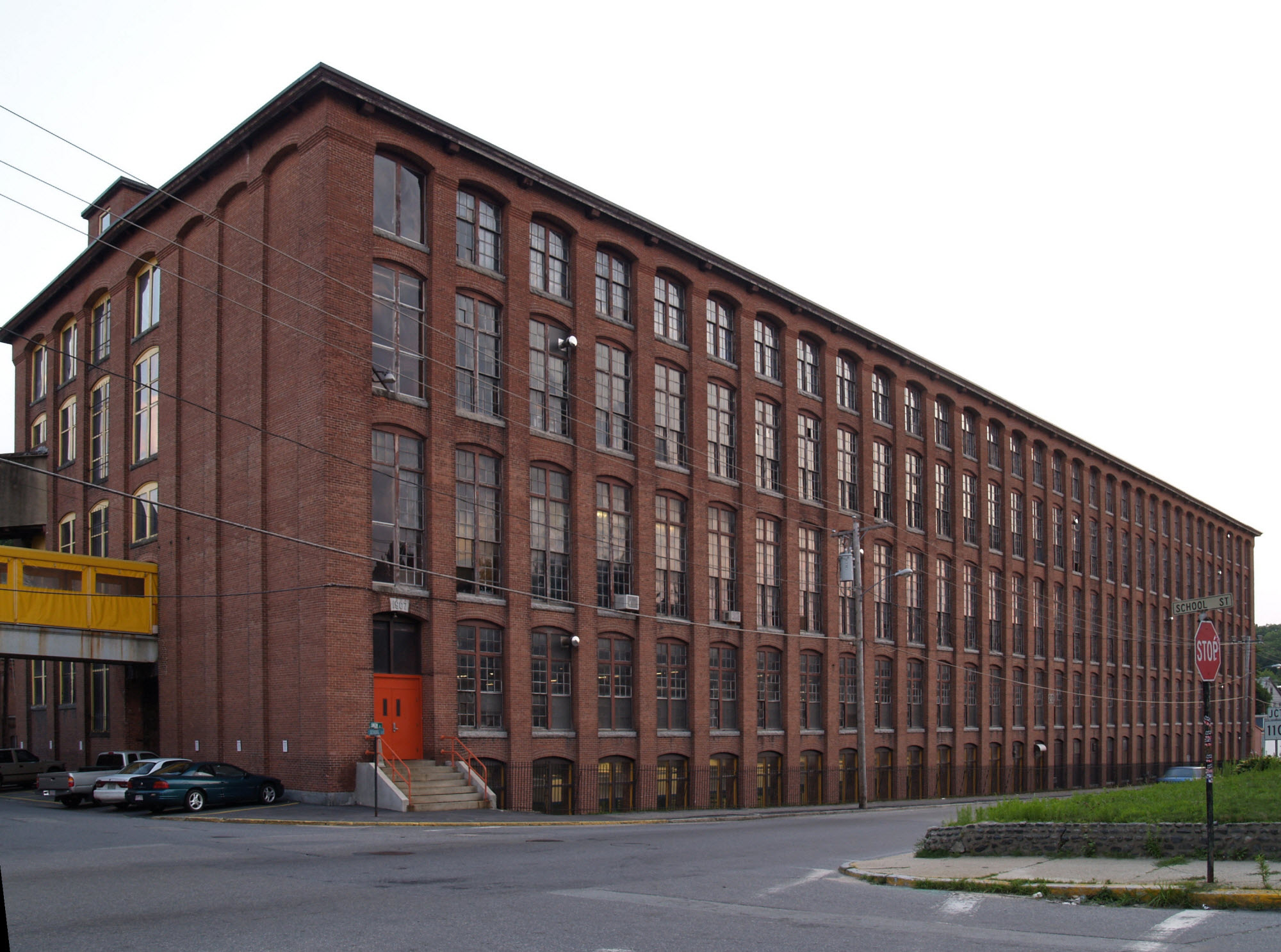

- Location within Massachusetts Location within the United States
- Location: Union St. at High St., Clinton, Massachusetts
- Coordinates: 42°24′55″N 71°41′10″W
- Area: 9.5 acres (3.8 ha)
- Built: 1847
- NRHP reference No.: 78000467
- Added to NRHP: December 22, 1978

The Bigelow Carpet Mill is an historic textile mill complex at Union and High Streets in Clinton, Massachusetts. Built in 1847 and repeatedly enlarged until 1922, this large mill complex was one of the world's major early automated manufacturers of Brussels tapestry, established by Horatio and Erastus Bigelow. The mill was listed on the National Register of Historic Places in 1978.

== Description and history ==
The Bigelow Carpet Mill complex is located just south of downtown Clinton. Most of the complex is bounded on the north by Union Street, the south by Pleasant Street, and the west by School Street, with one building on the west side of School Street. The complex includes six brick buildings, ranging in height from two to five stories. Two of the buildings exhibit a measure of commercial Italianate styling, with round-arch windows and brick corbelling, and distinctive crenellated and corbelled towers in two locations. The interior framing of the buildings is general large timbers.

The mill complex's history begins in 1847, when Erastus Bigelow received the first of forty patents related to the automated manufacture of carpeting. In 1849, in partnership with his brother Horatio, they began manufacturing Brussels tapestry in an already-existing building on this site. That building no longer stands; the oldest surviving building of the complex was built by the Bigelows in 1855. The Bigelow Carpet Company grew to become a leading manufacturer of carpeting in the late 19th century, its complex here growing to accommodate increased production. In the 1880s its earlier buildings were extensively reworked, giving the complex a distinct late-19th-century appearance. The mill was closed in the 1930s, its components either vacant or used for storage until the 1970s, when they began to see increased industrial use again. The complex is now global headquarters for Nypro, a design, manufacturing and supply chain service provider for medical devices, diagnostics and pharmaceutical delivery systems.

== See also ==
- National Register of Historic Places listings in Worcester County, Massachusetts
