= Sholan =

Leader of the Nashaway tribe (died 1654)

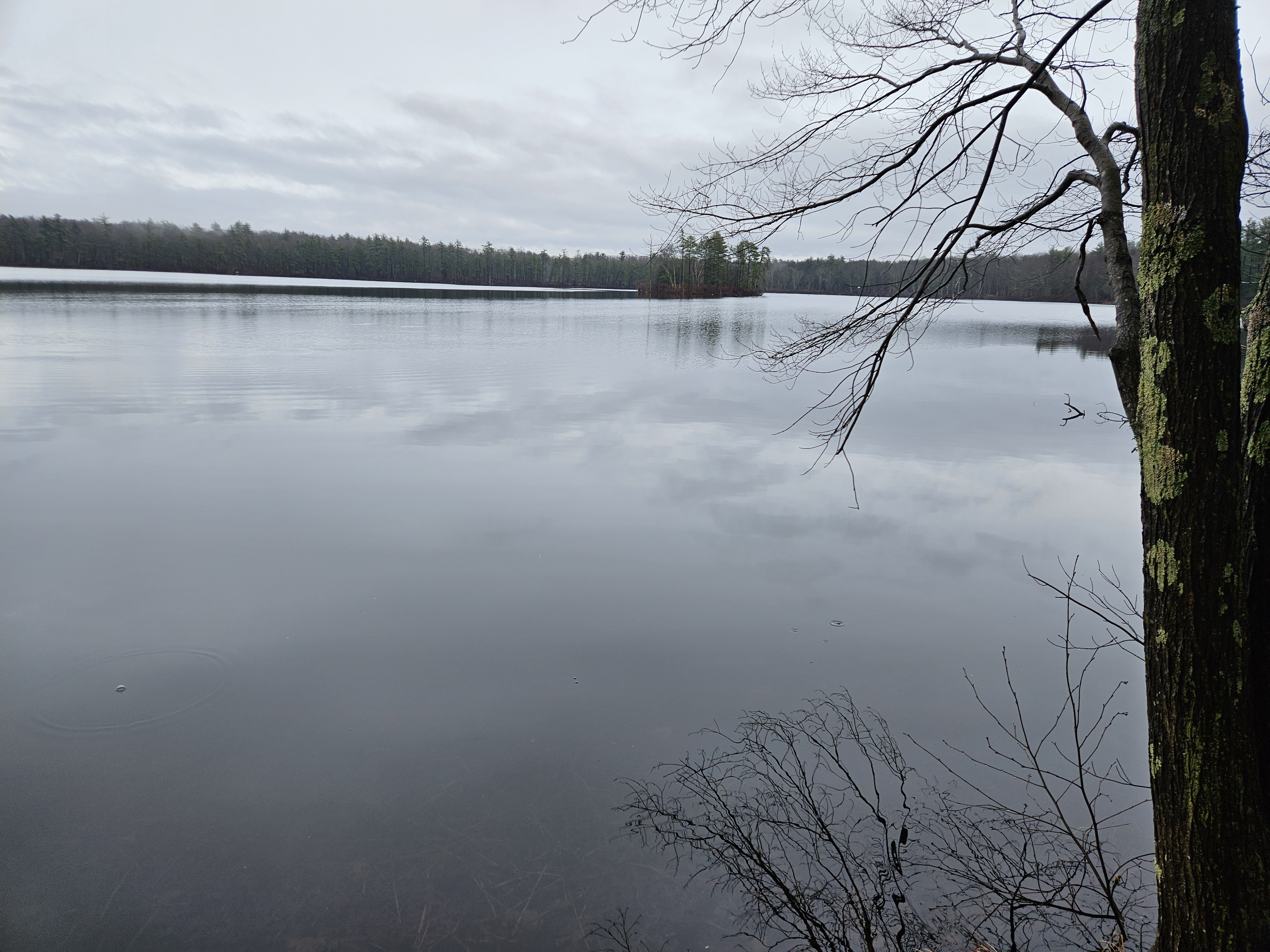
West Waushacum Pond in Sterling, near Sholan's home

Sholan (died 1654) (also known as Nashawhonan, Nashoonan, Shawanon, and Showanon) was the leader (sachem) of the Nashaway tribe who lived on a small hill between the two Waushacum Lakes in what is now Sterling, Massachusetts.

Bypassing Willard's trading post in Concord, Sholan often visited Thomas King's trading post at Watertown to sell pelts, and developed a friendship with King. In 1641 or 1642 Sholan recommended that King move to the Nashua Valley, likely to make it easier for the Nashaway to transport goods and to protect the Nashaway's position from encroachment by others. In 1643 Sholan sold King and others in the Nashway Company an eighty-mile square tract of land, which became the towns of Lancaster, Berlin, Boylston, Bolton, Sterling, Clinton, and Harvard.

Sholan and several other Nashaway were also remembered for escorting John Eliot on one of his journeys in 1648 Eliot wrote a letter to Edward Winslow stating:

"Shawanon the great Sachym of Nashawog doth embrace the Gospel, and pray unto God. I have been foure times there this Summer, and there be more people by far, then be amongst us; and sundry of them do gladly hear the word of God, but it is neer 40 miles off, and I can but seldom goe to them; where at they are troubled, and desire I should come oftner, and stay longer when I come."

Sholan died in October 1654 and was succeeded in office by his nephew Matthew who was chosen after the tribe was advised to do so by John Eliot as encouraged by the Massachusetts authorities, instead of a rival (possibly Shoshanin) who was prone to intoxication. Prior to 1675 Matthew died and was succeeded by Shoshanin who supported Metacomet, also known as King Philip. Sholan was also survived by a nephew, George Tahanto, who deeded further land grants to settlers in the area in 1701.

== Legacy ==
Sholan's name is remembered various local landmarks including Sholan Park on Lake Waushacum in Sterling, Sholan Circle in Harvard, and Sholan Farms in Leominster.

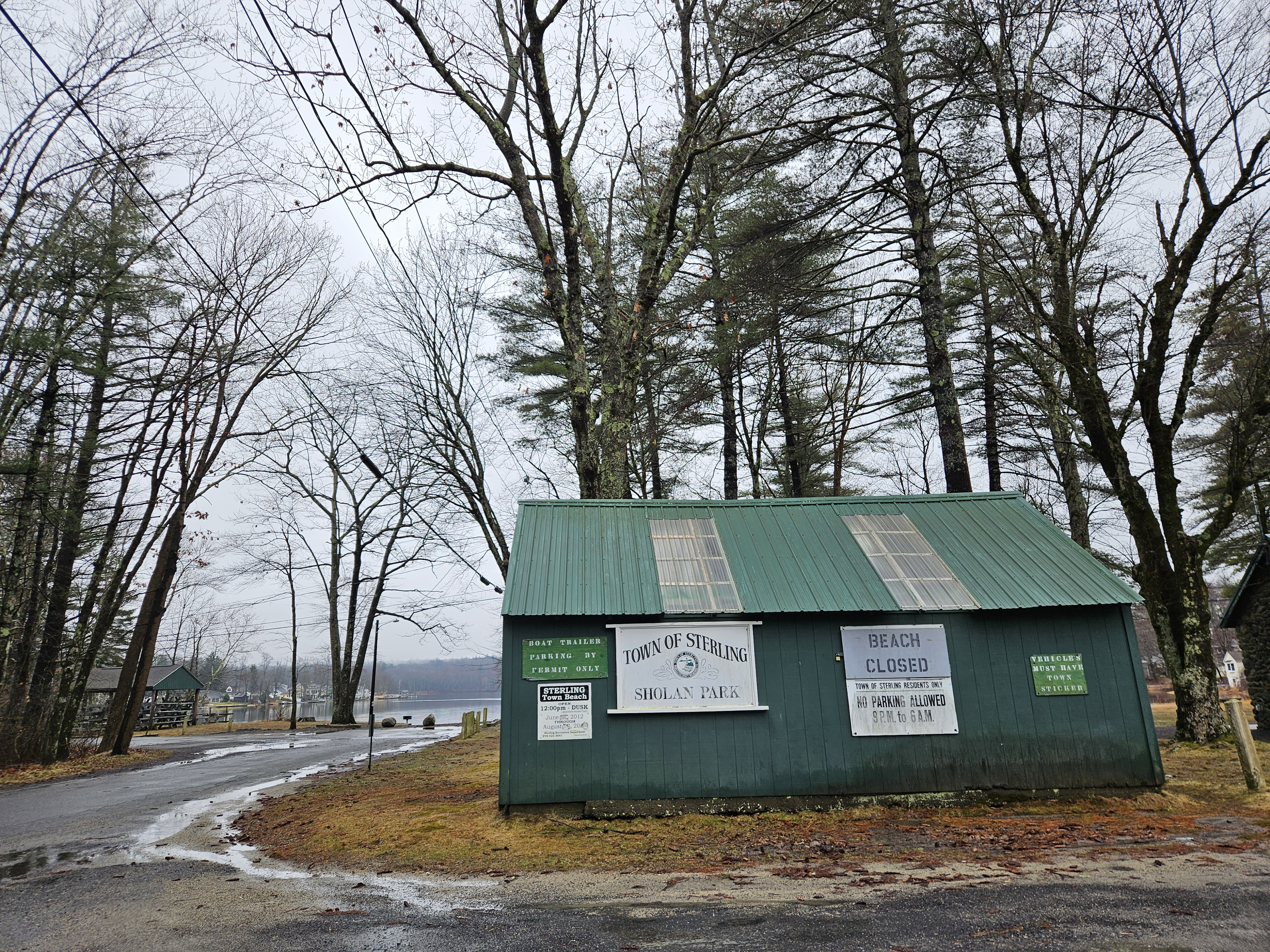
Sholan Park on East Waushacum Pond named in honor of Sachem Sholan

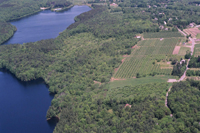
Sholan Farms, named after Chief Nashawhonan (Sholan), is located in Leominster, Massachusetts
