= Worcester County Horticultural Society =

- Abbreviation: WCHS
- Formation: 19 September 1840, de facto 3 March 1842, official
- Founded at: Worcester, Massachusetts
- Headquarters: Tower Hill Botanic Garden, 11 French Dr, Boylston, MA 01505
- President: James Karadimos

The Worcester County Horticultural Society is a non-profit American horticultural society based in Boylston, Massachusetts, US, whose stated mission in 2014 was to "inspire the use and appreciation of horticulture to improve lives, enrich communities and strengthen commitment to the natural world", building upon its founding mission to "advanc[e] the science and encourag[e] and improv[e] the practice of [h]orticulture". Formally established in 1842, it describes itself as the third-oldest horticultural society in the United States after the Pennsylvania Horticultural Society and the Massachusetts Horticultural Society. Today, the society's work predominantly focuses in organizing and operating Tower Hill Botanic Garden, as well as supporting the Cary Award, an award program for excellence in New England cultivation practices.

== History ==
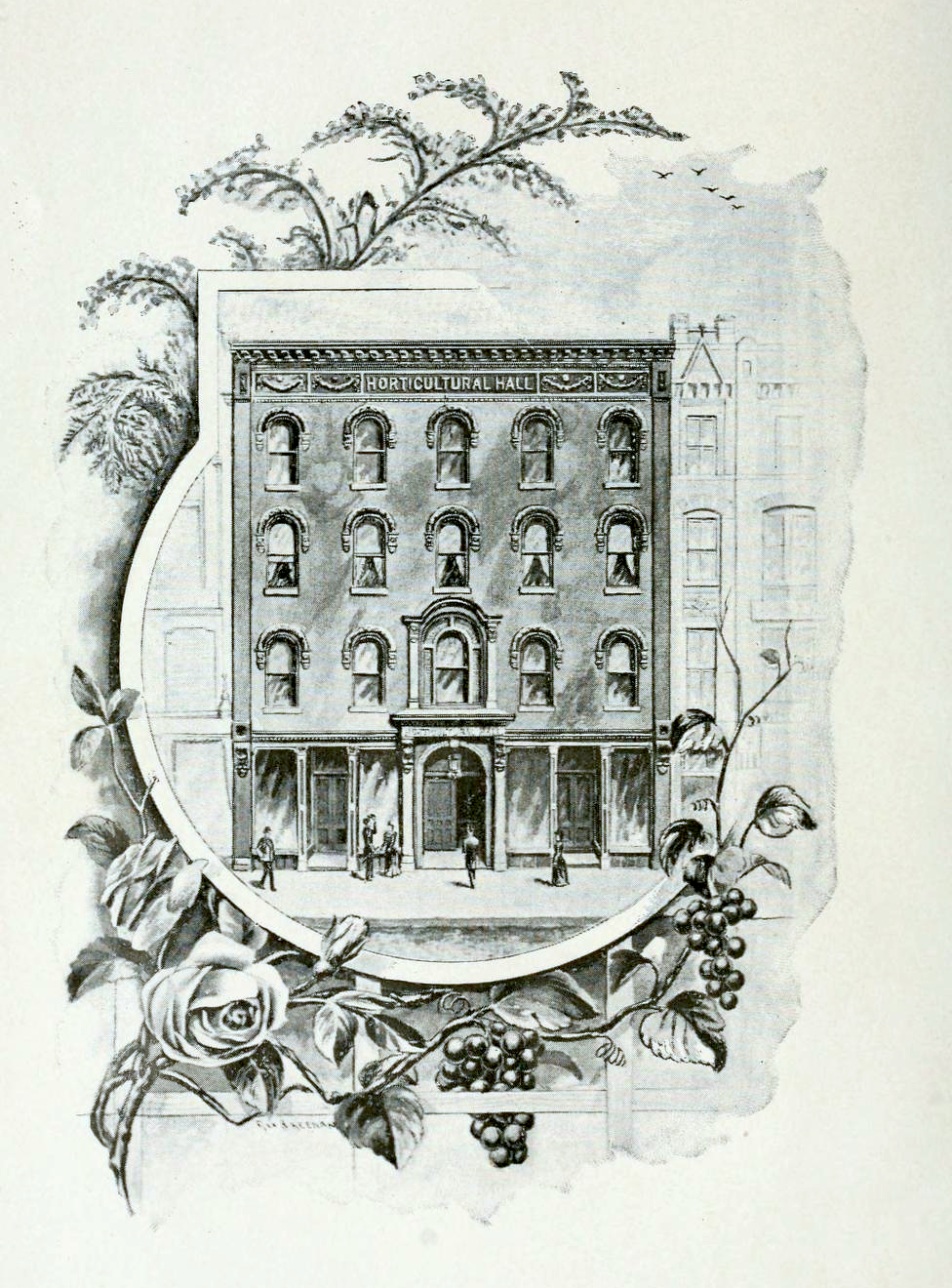
An illustration of the first Horticultural Hall on Front St., 1892

The society was informally founded on September 19, 1840, when several local doctors and businessmen met in Worcester "for the purposes of mutual improvement in the theoretical and practical branches of Horticulture" and, in the subsequent weeks, organized an exhibition of fine specimens of orchard and garden plants from cultivators in Central Massachusetts. The organization's founders shaped it in homage to the Royal Horticultural Society in London, expressing hope in their earliest reports that their "little Society, which has thus far so bravely followed in the footsteps of the great Association of London, may, like our other institutions, continue to flourish". The society was formally established by an act of the Massachusetts General Court on March 3, 1842. The group continued to host exhibitions annually and, by 1850, had a large enough membership and funds to purchase a plot of land and to construct its first formal headquarters, "Horticultural Hall", on Front Street in Worcester. Continuing to expand throughout the 19th century and the early 20th century, the society built another, larger, facility with library and auditorium space in 1928. This building is now home to the Worcester Historical Museum.

In 1983, the board of trustees made a motion to found a botanical garden in Worcester County and, by the end of 1985, this was filled with the purchase of the Tower Hill Farm which is the society's main project and headquarters today. Though the society moved from its Worcester headquarters in 1986, it remains active in the community, having spearheaded efforts in the Worcester Tree Initiative by providing more than 30,000 trees to replace those lost in efforts to eradicate the Asian long-horned beetle.

== Governance ==
Operations of the Worcester County Horticultural Society are overseen by a board of trustees. Trustees meet at regular intervals throughout the year, as well as on committees that support the staff of Tower Hill Botanic Garden. Daily operations of the garden are led by a CEO, directors and staff managers.

Presidents
Name	Dates of term
John Green	1840–1844
Isaac Davis (lawyer)	1844–1848
John Milton Earle	1848–1851
Stephen Salisbury	1851–1857
Daniel Waldo Lincoln	1857–1860
Alexander Bullock	1860–1863
George Jaques	1863–1864
Francis H. Dewey	1867–1871
J. Henry Hill	1864–1867
George W. Richardson	1871–1872
George E. Francis	1872–1874
Obadiah Hadwen	1875–1876
William T. Merrifield	1876–1879
Stephen Salisbury III	1879–1881
Francis H. Dewey	1881–1888
Henry L. Parker	1888–1895
Obadiah Hadwen	1895–1908
George Calvin Rice	1908–1910
Edward W. Breed	1910–1916
Arthur E. Hartshorn	1916–1918
Charles Greenwood	1918–1920
Leonard C. Midgely	1920–1922
David L. Fiske	1922–1923
Myron F. Converse	1923–1948
Allen W. Hixon	1948–1960
Dr. Robert S. Illingworth	1960–1963
Herbert E. Berg	1963–1964
Linwood E. Erskine	1964–1968
Frederick D. Brown	1968–1972
Palmer W. Bigelow Jr.	1972–1975
Paul E. Rogers	1975–1979
H. Waite Hurlburt	1979–1984
Cushing C. Bozenhard	1/1984-4/1984
Philip C. Beals	1984–1998
Hope H. Spear	1988–1992
Richard W. Dearborn	1992–1995
Mary "Sid" V.C. Callahan	1995–1999
Dale R. Harger	1999–2001
Jeremy F. O'Connell	2002–2007
Betsy C. DeMallie	2007–2009
Christopher S. Reece	2009–2015
James Karadimos	2016–present
