= Clinton, Massachusetts =

- Town
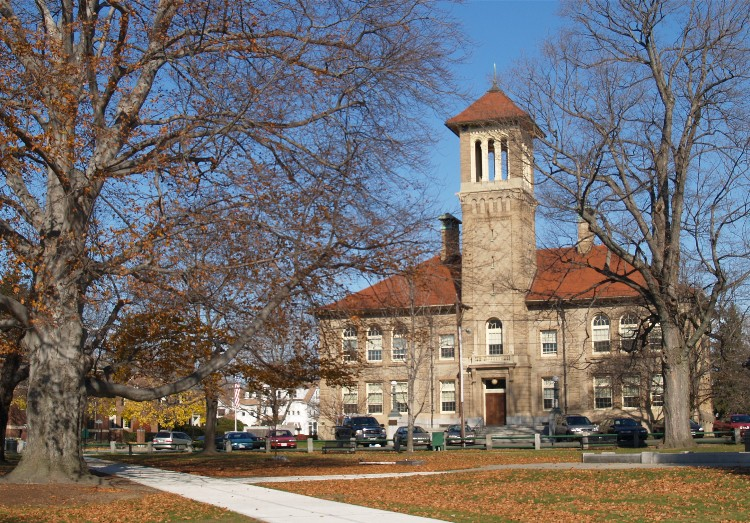
- Clinton Town Hall

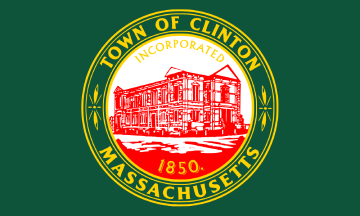
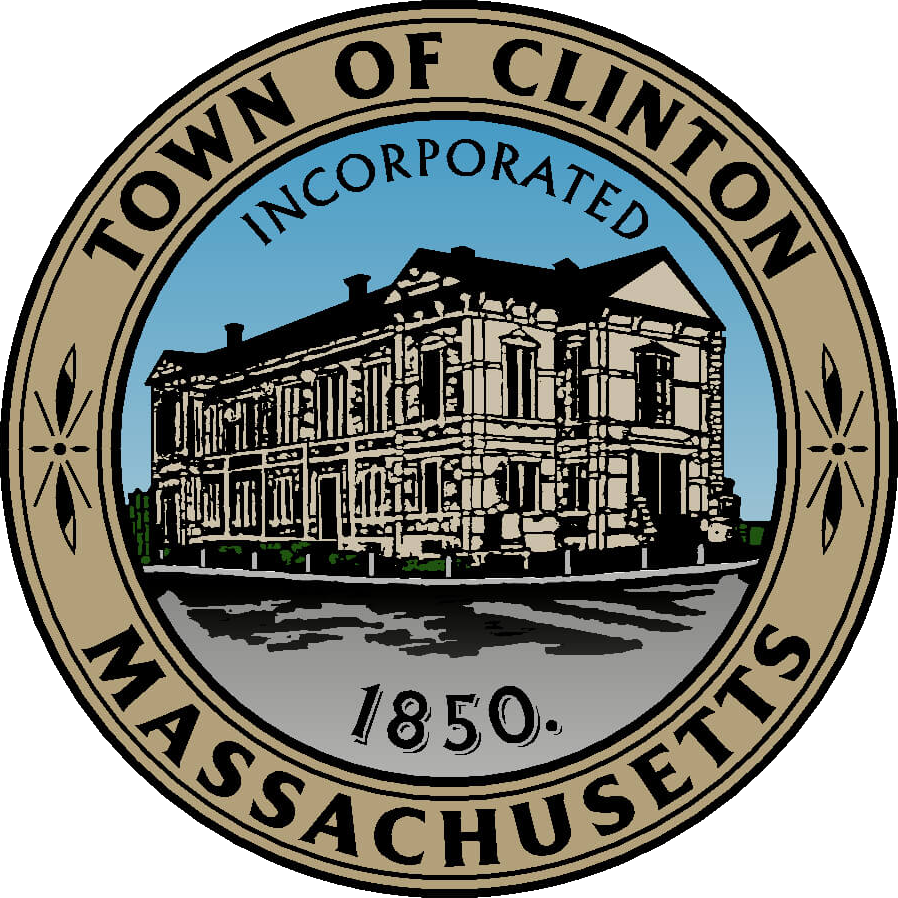
- Flag Seal
- Nickname: Clintonville (Original part of Lancaster)
- Location in Worcester County and the state of Massachusetts.
- Coordinates: 42°25′00″N 71°41′00″W
- Country: United States
- State: Massachusetts
- County: Worcester
- Settled: 1654
- Incorporated: 1850

Government
  - Type: Open town meeting
  - Town Administrator: Michael J. Ward
  - Select Board: Matthew Kobus (Chair); Sean J. Kerrigan (Vice-Chair); Edward J. Devault; Julie Perusse; Mary Dickhaut

Area
  - Total: 7.3 sq mi (18.9 km^{2})
  - Land: 5.7 sq mi (14.8 km^{2})
  - Water: 1.6 sq mi (4.1 km^{2})
- Elevation: 367 ft (112 m)

Population (2020)
  - Total: 15,428
  - Density: 2,700/sq mi (1,042/km^{2})
- Time zone: UTC−5 (Eastern)
  - Summer (DST): UTC−4 (Eastern)
- ZIP Code: 01510
- Area code: 351/978
- FIPS code: 25-14395
- GNIS feature ID: 0618360
- Website: www.clintonma.gov

Clinton is a town in Worcester County, Massachusetts, United States. The population was 15,428 at the 2020 census. It contains the census-designated place of the same name.

== History ==
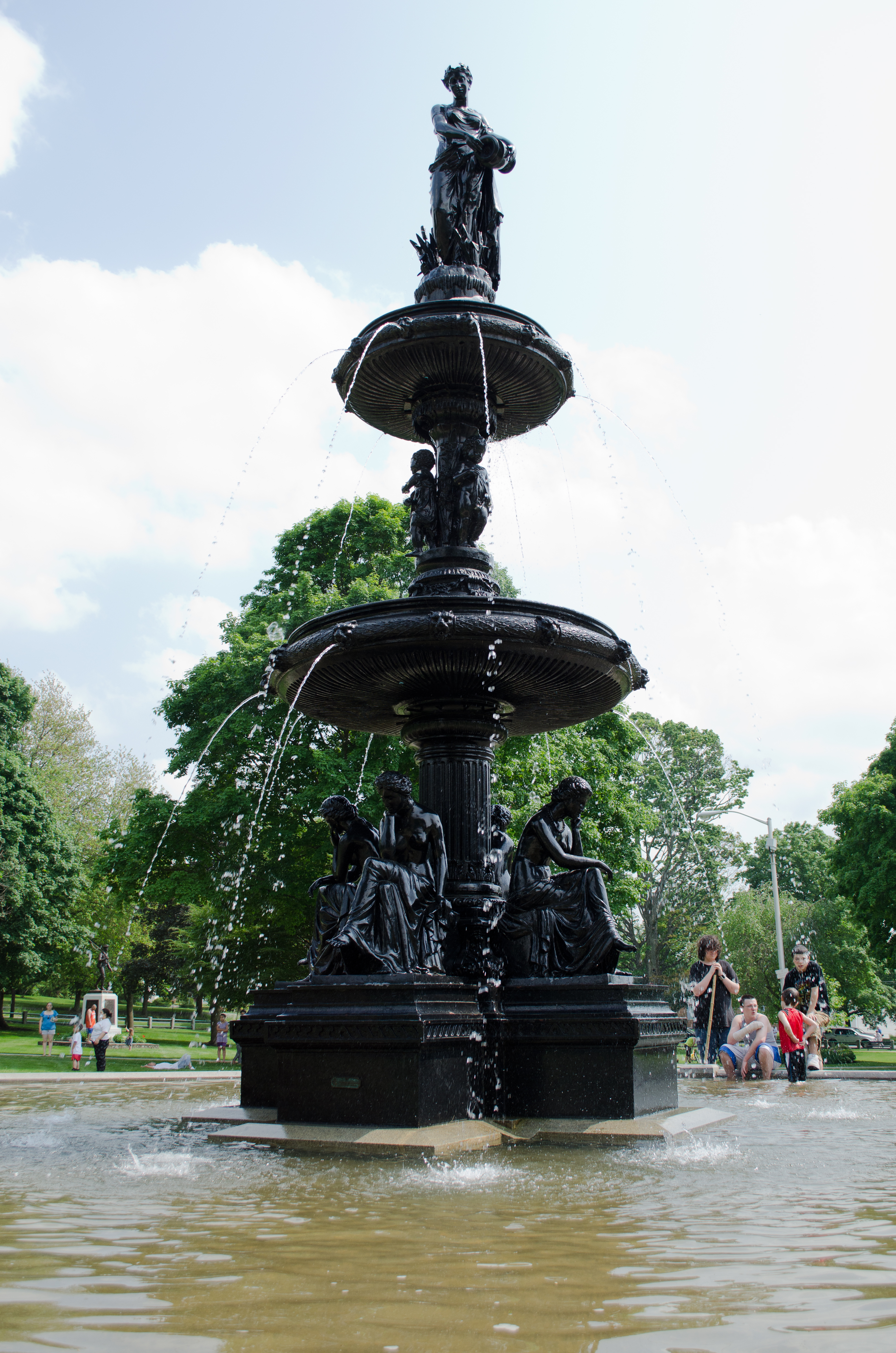
The Central Park Foster Fountain in Central Park.

Clinton was first settled in 1654 as a part of Lancaster after the land was deeded by Sachem Sholan of the Nashaway in 1643. It was officially incorporated as a separate town on March 14, 1850, and named after the DeWitt Clinton Hotel in New York, a favorite place of the town's founders, Erastus Brigham Bigelow and his brother Horatio.

Clinton became an industrialized mill town, using the Nashua River as a source for water power. In 1897, construction began on the Wachusett Dam, culminating in the filling of the Wachusett Reservoir in 1908. This flooded a substantial portion of Clinton and neighboring towns, which had to be relocated. A noteworthy feature of the Boston metropolitan public water service was begun in 1896 in the Wachusett lake reservoir at Clinton. The basin excavated there by ten years of labor, lying 385 ft. above high-tide level of Boston Harbor, had a capacity of 63,068,000,000 gallons of water and was the largest municipal reservoir in the world in 1911, yet was only part of a system planned for the service of the greater metropolitan area.

Part of the Central Massachusetts Railroad line abandoned in 1958 includes a tunnel near Clamshell Road. Railroads came to the town to serve this industry, including the Boston, Clinton, Fitchburg and New Bedford Railroad (Fitchburg Branch of the Old Colony Railroad), the Central Massachusetts Railroad, and the Worcester, Nashua and Rochester Railroad (the last two later merged into the Boston and Maine Railroad). By 1890, Clinton was noted for its manufacturing of carpets and woven wire.

Clinton claims to have the oldest continuously used baseball field in the world, Fuller Field, created in 1878. This challenges the claim by London, Ontario, which argues for Labatt Memorial Park, established as Tecumseh Park in 1877. This is disputed by Clinton because the London field has been flooded and rebuilt twice, including a reorientation of the bases, and there is doubt Tecumseh Field was in continuous use after the 1883 flood.

== Geography ==
According to the United States Census Bureau, the town has a total area of 7.3 square miles (19 km^{2}), of which 5.7 square miles (15 km^{2}) is land and 1.6 square miles (4.1 km^{2}), or 21.78%, is water. The Nashua River runs through the town, and the large Wachusett Reservoir lies to the south of the town center.

Clinton is bordered by Lancaster to the north, Bolton to the northeast, Berlin to the east, Boylston to the south, and Sterling to the west.

== Demographics ==
Historical population
Year	Pop.	±%
1850	3,113	—
1860	3,859	+24.0%
1870	5,429	+40.7%
1880	8,029	+47.9%
1890	10,424	+29.8%
1900	13,667	+31.1%
1910	13,075	−4.3%
1920	12,979	−0.7%
1930	12,817	−1.2%
1940	12,440	−2.9%
1950	12,287	−1.2%
1960	12,848	+4.6%
1970	13,383	+4.2%
1980	12,771	−4.6%
1990	13,222	+3.5%
2000	13,435	+1.6%
2010	13,606	+1.3%
2020	15,428	+13.4%
2024*	15,740	+2.0%
* = population estimate. Source: United States census records and Population Estimates Program data.

As of the census of 2000, there were 13,435 people, 5,597 households, and 3,397 families residing in the town. The population density was 2,387 inhabitants per square mile (922/km^{2}). There were 5,844 housing units at an average density of 1,024.7 per square mile (395.6/km^{2}).

The racial makeup of the town was 88.20% White, 2.58% Black or African American, 0.22% Native American, 0.89% Asian, 0.04% Pacific Islander, 5.95% from other races, and 2.13% from two or more races. Hispanic or Latino of any race was 11.60% of the population. Ethnic heritages include Irish, Brazilian, Scottish, German, Québécois, Acadian, Swedish, Italian, Dominican, Puerto Rican, Mexican, Greek, and Polish. Many emigrants from the Louisburgh area of County Mayo settled in the small town in the early 1900s, giving Clinton a large Irish population till this day.

There were 5,597 households, out of which 28.1% had children under the age of 18 living with them, 43.7% were married couples living together, 12.7% had a female householder with no husband present, and 39.3% were non-families. Of all households, 33.1% were made up of individuals, and 12.4% had someone living alone who was 65 years of age or older. The average household size was 2.38 and the average family size was 3.06.

In the town, the population was spread out, with 23.0% under the age of 18, 7.8% from 18 to 24, 32.9% from 25 to 44, 21.3% from 45 to 64, and 15.0% who were 65 years of age or older. The median age was 37 years. For every 100 females, there were 92.9 males. For every 100 females age 18 and over, there were 89.6 males.

The median income for a household in the town was $44,740, and the median income for a family was $53,308. Males had a median income of $37,263 versus $30,035 for females. The per capita income for the town was $22,764. About 4.9% of families and 7.1% of the population were below the poverty line, including 5.4% of those under age 18 and 13.9% of those ages 65 or over.

== Arts and culture ==
=== Library ===
The public library in Clinton opened in 1873. In fiscal year 2008, the town of Clinton spent 0.99% ($325,383) of its budget on its public library—approximately $23 per person.

=== Sites of interest ===
- Central Park
- Clinton Business District
- Fuller Field
- Multiple sections of the Mass Central Rail Trail, a partially completed shared-use rail trail extending across Massachusetts between Northampton and Boston.
- Museum of Russian Icons
- South Meadow and Mossy Ponds
- Wachusett Reservoir Clinton Dam

== Sports ==
Fuller Field is the home of the Clinton 76ers, a men's semi-professional baseball team as part of the CNEBA, and winners of the 2017 CNEBA title.

== Government ==
State government
State Representative(s):	Meghan Kilcoyne (D)
State Senator(s):	John Cronin (D)
Governor's Councilor(s):	Jen Caissie (R)
Federal government
U.S. Representative(s):	Lori Trahan (D-3rd District),
U.S. Senators:	Elizabeth Warren (D), Ed Markey (D)

== Education ==
=== Clinton Public Schools ===
Clinton Elementary School (K–4)

Clinton Middle School (5–8)

Clinton High School (9–12)

== Notable people ==
- Mike Bonin, Los Angeles City Councilor
- Clarence Brown, film director
- Joseph E. Casey, lawyer and former US Representative
- Fred J. Douglas, former US Congressman
- Tim Fortugno, former Major League Baseball pitcher
- Carroll Gibbons, musician
- Joseph L. Gormley, chief of chemistry and toxicology for the FBI
- Sliding Billy Hamilton, member of Baseball Hall of Fame
- Mal Kittridge, baseball player
- Agnes Moorehead, actress
- Frank O'Malley, English professor
- Philip J. Philbin, former US Congressman
- Jimmy Ryan, major league baseball player
- Sydney Schanberg, Pulitzer Prize–winning reporter
- David Walsh, former US Senator and Massachusetts governor
- Scott Young, former professional ice hockey player

== See also ==
- List of mill towns in Massachusetts
