= Case's Corner Historic District =

Historic district in Massachusetts, United States

- U.S. National Register of Historic Places
- U.S. Historic district
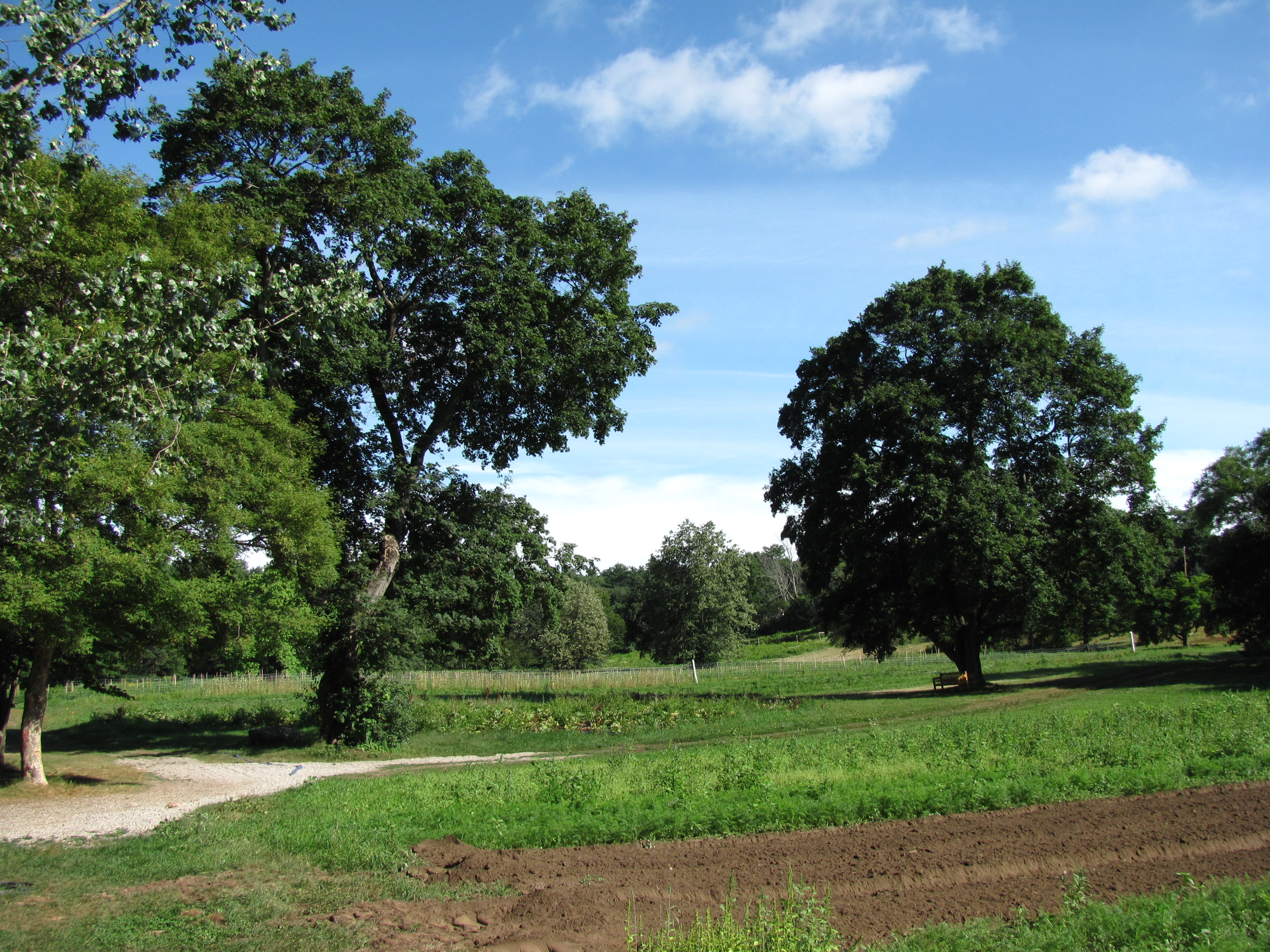
- Land's Sake Farm

- Location within Massachusetts Location within the United States
- Location: Weston, Massachusetts
- Coordinates: 42°21′29″N 71°17′55″W
- Area: 190 acres (77 ha)
- Architectural style: Colonial, Greek Revival
- NRHP reference No.: 02001038
- Added to NRHP: September 12, 2002

Case's Corner Historic District is a residential, civic, and rural historic district in the geographic center of Weston, Massachusetts. The district is centered on the four-way intersection of School, Wellesley, Newton and Ash Streets in Weston, Massachusetts, and runs mainly along Wellesley Street, which runs north-south through the district between the centers of Weston and Wellesley. The district encompasses a pastoral landscape managed by Marian Case, a horticulturalist and landscape preservationist. One of its central features is the Case Estates, a 60-acre (24 ha) property bequested by Case to Harvard University that once served as a nursery for Boston's Arnold Arboretum. The district was listed on the National Register of Historic Places in 2002.

== Description and history ==
The multi-junction intersection of Wellesley, School, Newton, and Ash Streets is located near the geographic center of Weston, a sprawling suburb of Boston, Massachusetts. To the west and north of this junction is a cluster of civic buildings, including several schools and former school buildings, as well as the Weston Public Library. East of this cluster and north of the junction is a residential area of late 19th and early 20th century houses that is bounded on the north by United States Route 20, which forms the historic district's northern boundary. East of the junction is town-owned open land that is partially occupied by Land's Sake Farm, but is generally preserved by the town as open space. To the south and southwest are lands that made up a significant portion of the former Case Estate, some which are now owned by Harvard University. Included in these lands are the Case Estates, west of Wellesley Street, which served as a nursery for the Harvard-owned Arnold Arboretum in Boston, but are now under negotiations to be acquired by the town.

The core of the historic district is a landscape mostly developed and preserved by Marian Case. Her father, James Case, was a wealthy Boston businessman who purchased land here in 1869, and in 1889 built the large Shingle style mansion at 89 Wellesley Street. After James Case died in 1907, Marian established what became known has Hillcrest Gardens, a model market garden property which she used to educate and train a generation of horticulturalists, and to bring an appreciation of the vanishing rural landscapes to the town's children. In addition to the garden property, she purchased adjacent farm properties, preserving their farmhouses and outbuildings. The Hillcrest garden property was bequested to Harvard upon her death in 1944.

== See also ==
- National Register of Historic Places listings in Weston, Massachusetts
