= Boston Post Road Historic District =

Boston Post Road Historic District may refer to one of several historic districts along the Boston Post Road:

- Boston Post Road Historic District (Darien, Connecticut), listed on the NRHP in Fairfield County, Connecticut
- Boston Post Road Historic District (Weston, Massachusetts), listed on the NRHP in Massachusetts
- Boston Post Road Historic District (Rye, New York), listed on the NRHP in New York
