= Rev. Samuel Woodward House =

Historic house in Massachusetts, United States

- U.S. National Register of Historic Places
- U.S. Historic district – Contributing property
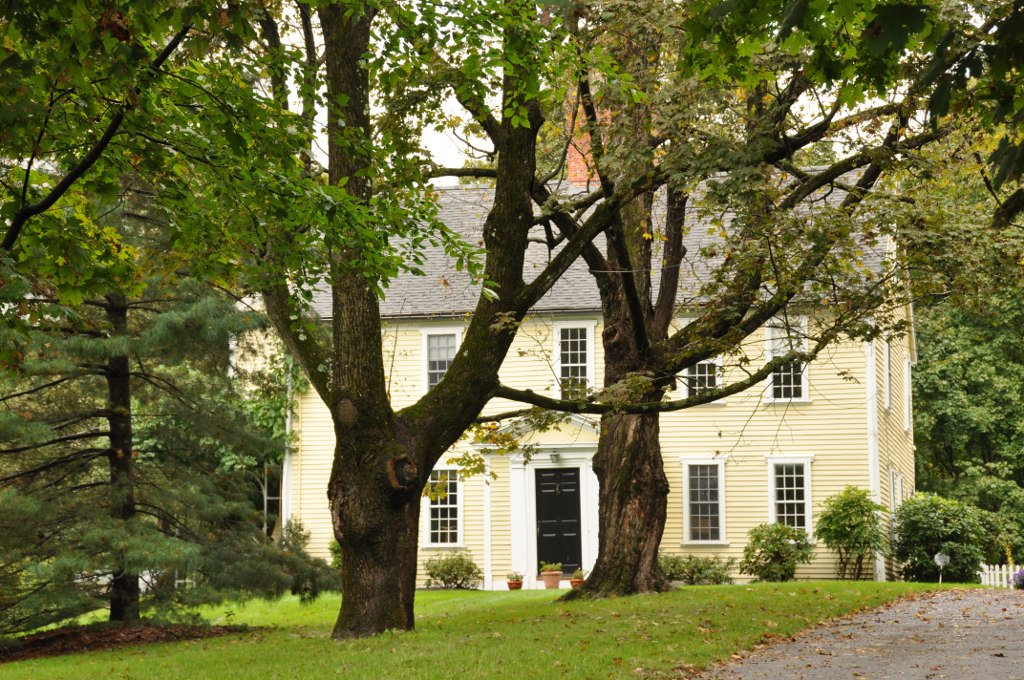

- Location within Massachusetts Location within the United States
- Location: 19 Concord Road, Weston, Massachusetts
- Coordinates: 42°22′5″N 71°18′21″W
- Area: 2 acres (0.81 ha)
- Built: 1753
- Architectural style: Georgian
- Part of: Boston Post Road Historic District (ID83009783)
- NRHP reference No.: 76000283

Significant dates
- Added to NRHP: October 8, 1976
- Designated CP: February 11, 1983

The Rev. Samuel Woodward House is a historic house located at 19 Concord Road in Weston, Massachusetts. Built in 1753, it is a well-preserved example of mid-18th century Georgian architecture. It has also been home to a succession of people significant to the history of the town. It was listed on the National Register of Historic Places in 1976, and was included in Weston's Boston Post Road Historic District in 1983.

== Description and history ==
The Woodward House stands just west of the main cluster of buildings making up Weston village's commercial heart. It is located on the north side of Concord Road, just north of its junction with Boston Post Road, and roughly opposite the end of Fiske Lane. It is a typical Georgian colonial house, 2 1/2 stories in height, with a gabled roof, central chimney, and clapboarded exterior. It has five bays on the front facade, with a central entry. The entry has been projected (a likely later addition) to provide a vestibule area under a gabled roof. The entry is framed by pilasters and a modest entablature; the gable above is pedimented.

The house was built in 1753 by Reverend Samuel Woodward, the town's second minister for the First Parish Church, on land he purchased in 1752. The house is believed to incorporate elements of an older house, probably built by the previous landowner, William Smith. In addition to Rev. Woodward, the house has also been occupied by his successor, Rev. Samuel Kendal. Kendal sold the house to Artemas Ward Jr., a prominent local lawyer and politician who lived in the house next door. Ward sold this house in 1797 to Dr. Amos Bancroft, who was the town physician for many years, and was active in local town government. It was owned for over 100 years by the Fiske family.

== See also ==
- National Register of Historic Places listings in Weston, Massachusetts
