= Henderson House (Weston, Massachusetts) =

Historic house in Massachusetts, United States

- Edward Peirce House-Henderson House
- U.S. National Register of Historic Places
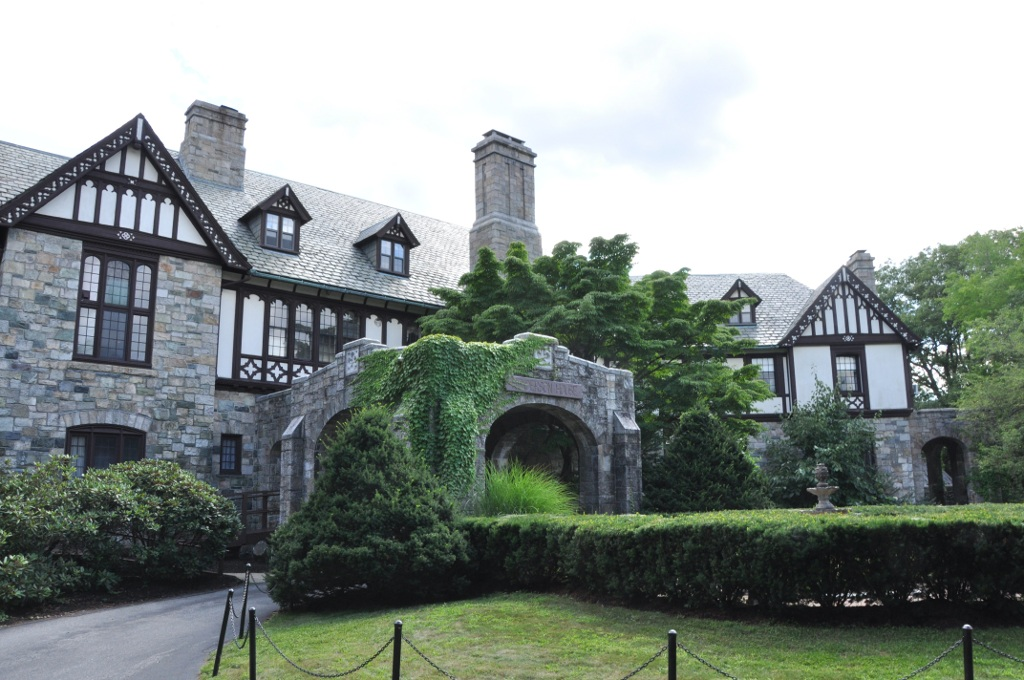

- Location within Massachusetts Location within the United States
- Location: 99 Westcliff Road, Weston, Massachusetts
- Coordinates: 42°19′23″N 71°17′50″W
- Area: 5.62 acres (2.27 ha)
- Built: 1927
- Architect: Coolidge, Shepley, Bulfinch & Abbott
- Architectural style: Tudor Revival
- NRHP reference No.: 97000880
- Added to NRHP: August 19, 1997

The Henderson House, also known as the Edward Peirce House, is a historic house at 99 Westcliff Road in Weston, Massachusetts. Built in 1927–28, it is the last great summer estate house to be built in Weston, and one of about a dozen that survive. It was built for Edward Peirce, a businessman in the wool trade. It was for many years a conference center of Northeastern University, but is now in private ownership. It was listed on the National Register of Historic Places in 1997.

== Description and history ==
The Henderson House stands in a residential area of southern Weston, on the west side of Westcliff Road. It is set on a knoll from which expansive views in all directions, but particularly to the south, are possible. It is a large 2 1/2-story structure, its foundation and first floor built of stone, and the upper levels finished in stone as well has half-timbered stucco in the Tudor Revival style. The woodwork on the upper levels has elaborate decorative elements, each gable and window group receiving slightly different treatment. A stone porte-cochere projects over the circular drive in front of the main entrance, which features a heavy wooden door. The interior public spaces are richly decorated in woodwork, ironwork, and stone.

The house was built in 1927–28, on the site of an earlier Tudor house that burned in 1925. It was the centerpiece of a large country estate (more than 300 acres (120 ha) spanning the Weston-Wellesley line) of Edward Peirce, the owner, made a fortune in the wool business. The design was by Coolidge, Shepley, Bulfinch & Abbott, and may have reused portions of the previous estate house or its foundations. The estate also originally had a number of outbuildings, of which two have survived in altered forms as parts of nearby houses built on the former estate. The property passed into the hands of Roger Babson, before a nearly six-acre parcel was donated to Northeastern University by one of its trustees, Ernest Henderson. The school used the property as part of its continuing education programs and as a conference center. The house is the last surviving grand Tudor mansion of several that were once in Weston. The residence was closed for event functions as of December 31, 2014.

== See also ==
- National Register of Historic Places listings in Weston, Massachusetts
