= Harrington House (Weston, Massachusetts) =

Historic house in Massachusetts, United States

- U.S. National Register of Historic Places
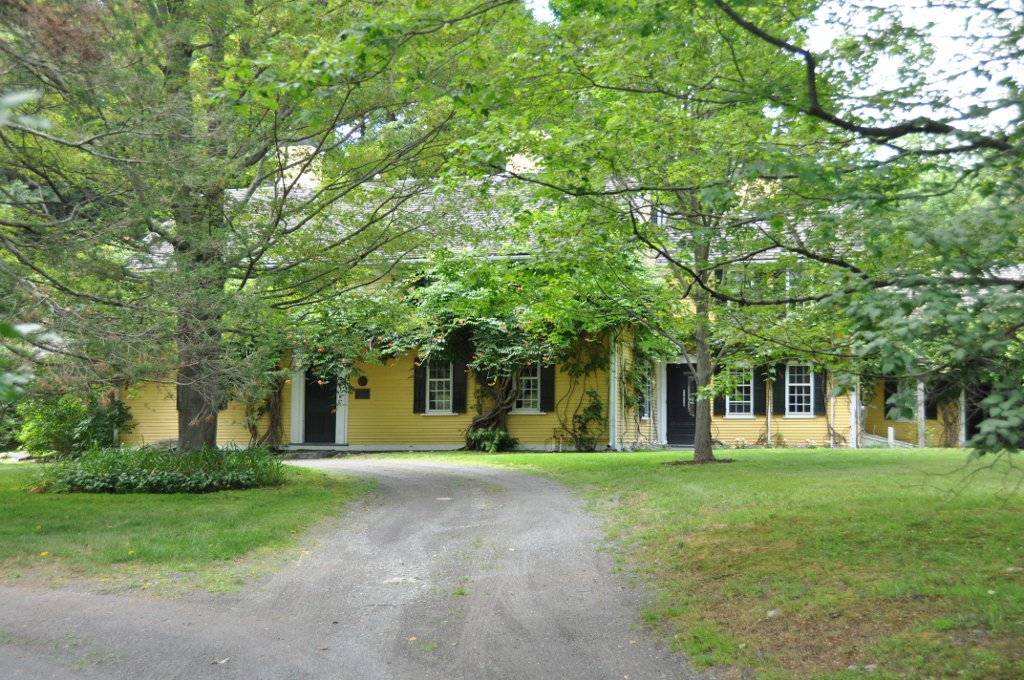

- Location within Massachusetts Location within the United States
- Location: 555 Wellesley St., Weston, Massachusetts
- Coordinates: 42°19′38″N 71°18′39″W
- Area: 3.9 acres (1.6 ha)
- Built: 1710
- Architectural style: Colonial
- NRHP reference No.: 76000281
- Added to NRHP: June 22, 1976

The Harrington House is a historic First Period house in Weston, Massachusetts, USA. With its oldest portion dating to about 1710, it is one of the town's oldest surviving buildings. It was listed on the National Register of Historic Places in 1976.

== Description and history ==
The Harrington House stands in a rural-residential area of southwestern Weston, on the northwest side of Wellesley Street north of its junction with Sylvan Lane. The original main block is 2 1/2 stories in height and four bays wide, with a side gable roof and clapboard siding. To this, a two-bay section was added to the east. The two sections are clearly different structures, with differing framing details, and floorboards in their garret spaces oriented differently. Ells further expand the house to the side and rear. The interior is largely reflective of an early 19th-century remodeling effort, in which the original central chimney was replaced by two interior chimneys, and a central stair was added.

The land on which the house stands was part of a grant of more than 600 acres (240 ha) to Robert Harrington in 1634. The oldest portion of the main block, apparently its eastern two thirds, was built about 1710 by Benjamin Harrington, Jr. The property remained in the hands of his descendants until 1906. The house is unusual as a well-preserved example of two houses that were joined, estimated to have been done c. 1800, around the same period as the interior restyling.

== See also ==
- National Register of Historic Places listings in Weston, Massachusetts
