= First Parish Church (Weston, Massachusetts) =

Historic church in Massachusetts, United States

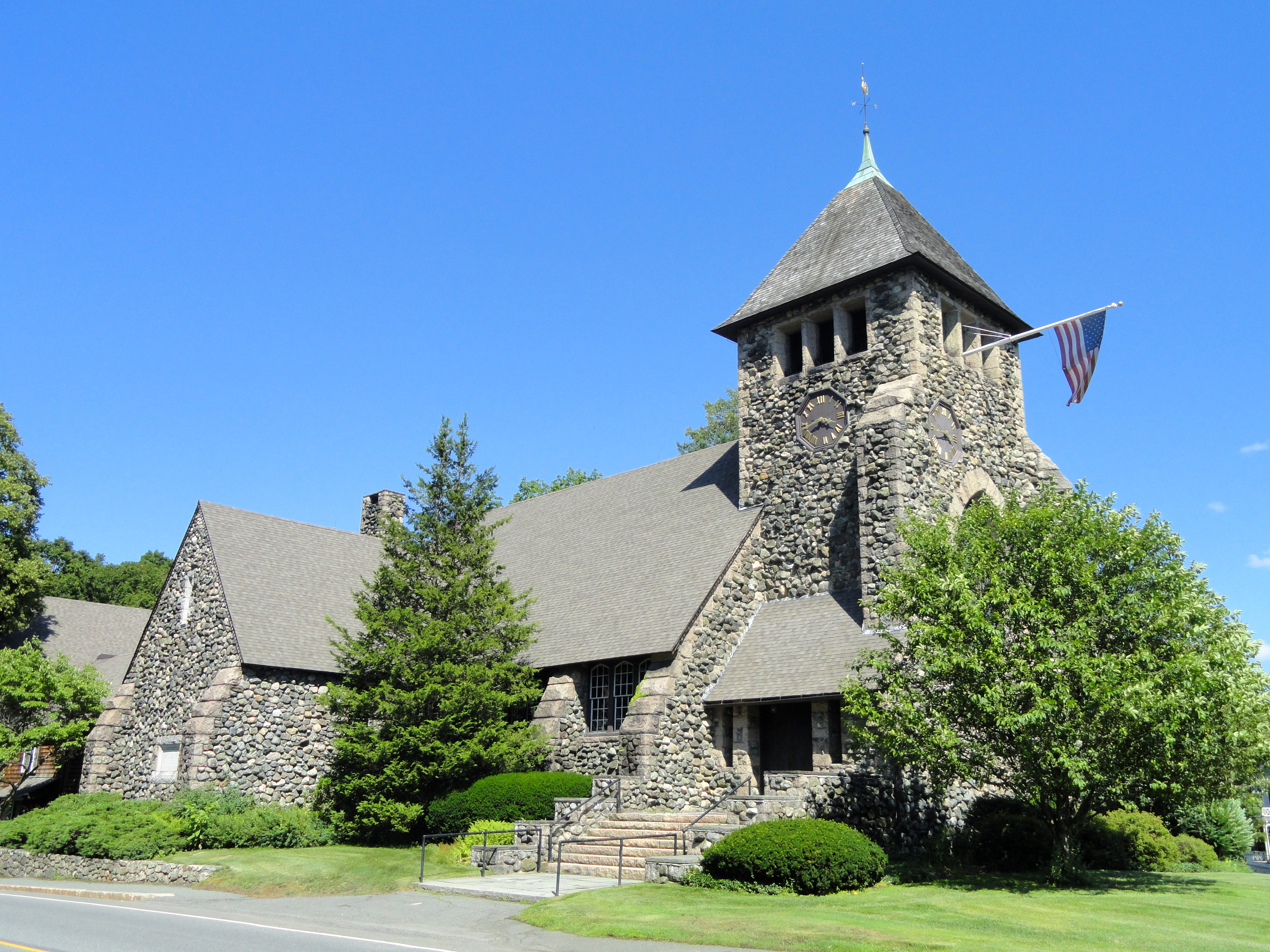
- First Parish Church in 2011
- First Parish Church
- 42.36836°N 71.29719°W
- Address: 349 Boston Post Rd. Weston, Massachusetts
- Country: United States
- Denomination: Unitarian
- Website: First Parish Weston

History
- Founded: 1698

Architecture
- Architect(s): Peabody & Stearns; Charles Eliot
- Architectural type: Fieldstone church
- Style: Norman Gothic
- Completed: 1888
- Construction cost: $15,000
- First Parish Church
- U.S. Historic district – Contributing property
- Coordinates: 42°22′6.2″N 71°17′49.8″W
- Part of: Boston Post Road Historic District (ID83000783)
- Designated CP: February 11, 1983

The First Parish Church is a Norman Gothic style fieldstone church built in 1888 by Peabody & Stearns with landscaping by Charles Eliot. It is located on Boston Post Road in Weston, Massachusetts. The current structure is the fourth church built at this site for the First Parish of Weston.

== History ==
The First Parish Church in Weston, Massachusetts has a history spanning nearly 300 years, with four different buildings erected on the same spot in Weston Center. Originally, in the mid-17th century, farmers and their families of the then West End of Watertown, gathered on this spot on Sunday mornings. The closest church was located in Watertown, ten miles away. Citing the long journey, the West End residents petitioned for their own church.

In 1698, the first meetinghouse was built. It was "a rough hewn structure built of logs" with a "hard dirt floor and wooden benches." The original congregation consisted of 18 men and their families. Men sat on one side, women and girls on the other, while the minister timed his sermon with an hourglass. This building was used for all church and town related meetings.

The meetinghouse was too small for the growing congregation and was in need of repair. In 1721, a larger colonial style meetinghouse was built, which was updated in 1800 with a larger bell and a steeple. The meetinghouse served the parish for 118 years, and was heated for the first time in 1815.

In 1839, plans for a new church and town hall building began to separate the two and in 1840, the third church was built in the Greek Revival style. This church served the congregation until 1888, when a committee unanimously decided that "the Parish build a new church edifice of stone, its cost not to exceed $10,000." Peabody and Stearns were chosen to design this new church, costing $15,000, including furnishings.

== Design ==
Peabody & Stearns designed the 1 1/2 story church in the Norman Gothic style based on churches of the English countryside seen by two benefactors of the Parish. The church foundation and exterior was built of fieldstone with ashlar cut limestone dressing, boulder walling, and patterned shingles. The interior was made of exposed red brick. The church has a complex slate and shingle ridge roof complement the front and side gable ends and half-timber stone walling.

The church features stained glass windows crafted by Louis Comfort Tiffany (west end) and Charles Jay Connick (on the east apse, from a chapel in Manchester-by-the-Sea). Notably, the church bell tower houses an 1800 Revere bell, initially acquired for use in the second church. A parsonage was added in 1913 at 3 Conant Road. In 1922, a parish house was added, followed by a chapel designed by H. B. Willis in 1930, and a new wing by Pierce & Pierce in 1966. The surrounding grounds and landscape was designed by Charles Eliot. In addition to the church and chapel, there includes a shed on Church Street and a house from the former Endicott Estate.

== Notable people ==
- Rev. Samuel Woodward – 3rd minister of the First Parish
- Rev. Edmund Hamilton Sears – 6th minister of the First Parish

== Gallery ==
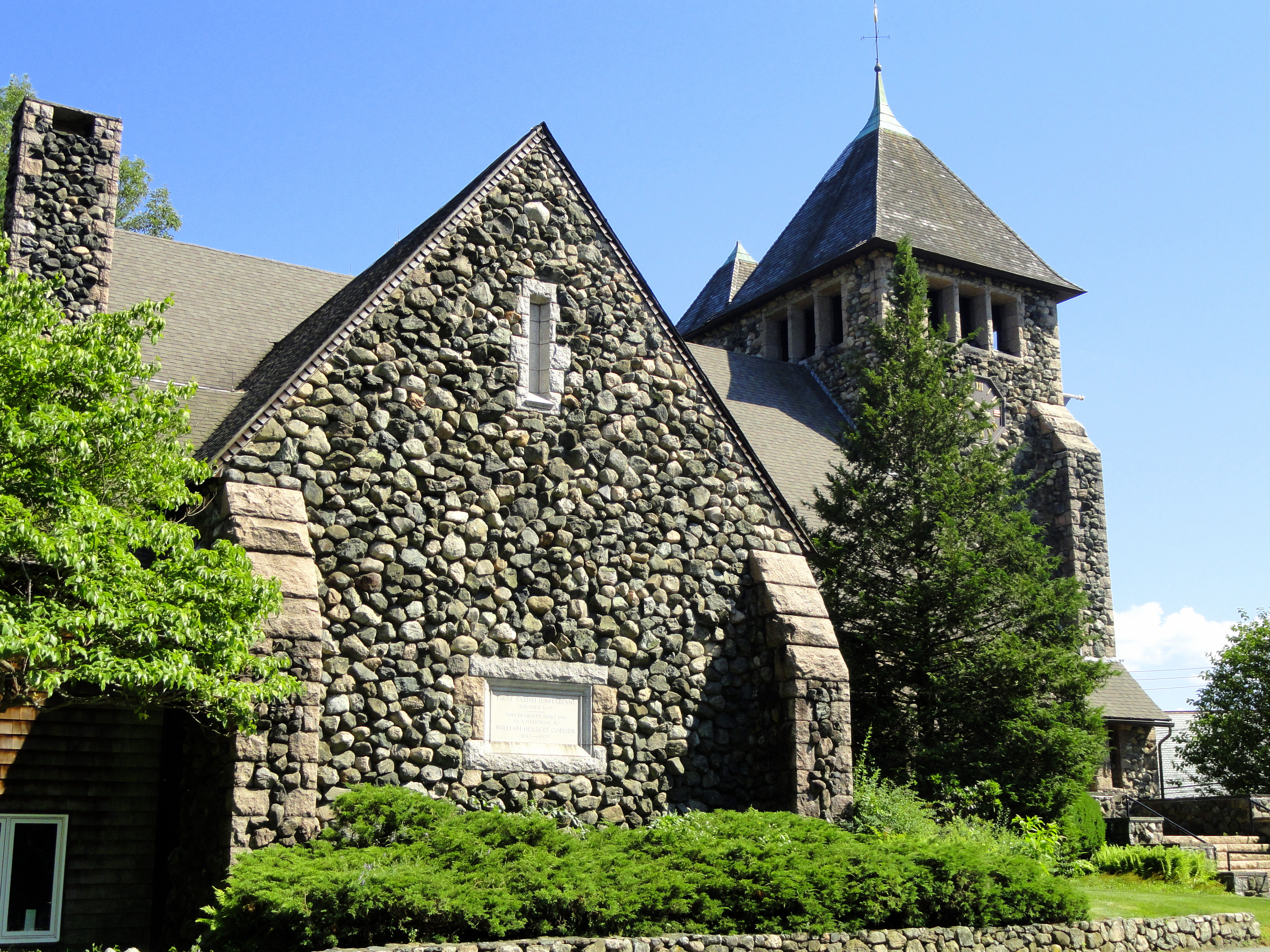
Side of church

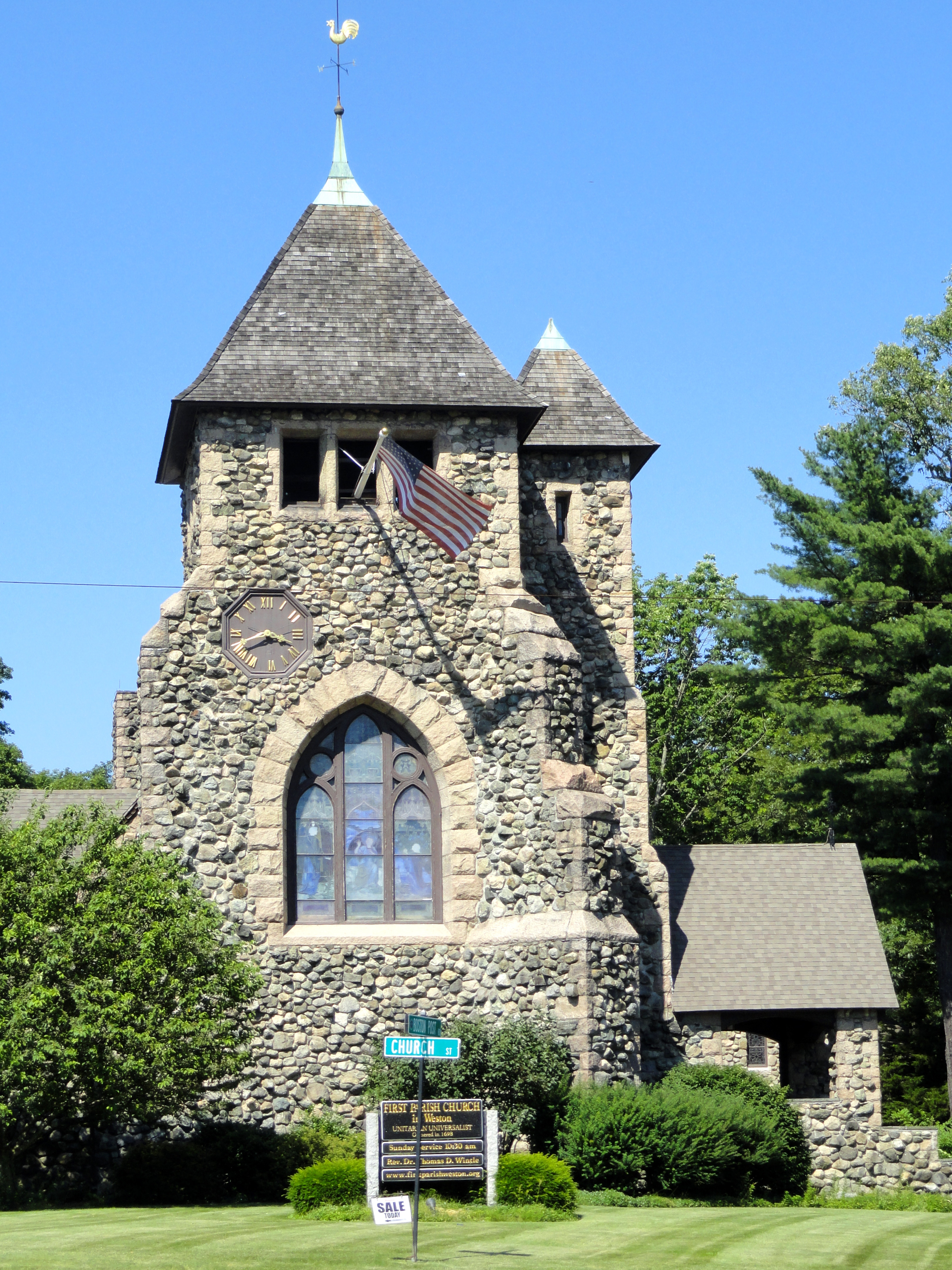
Front of church

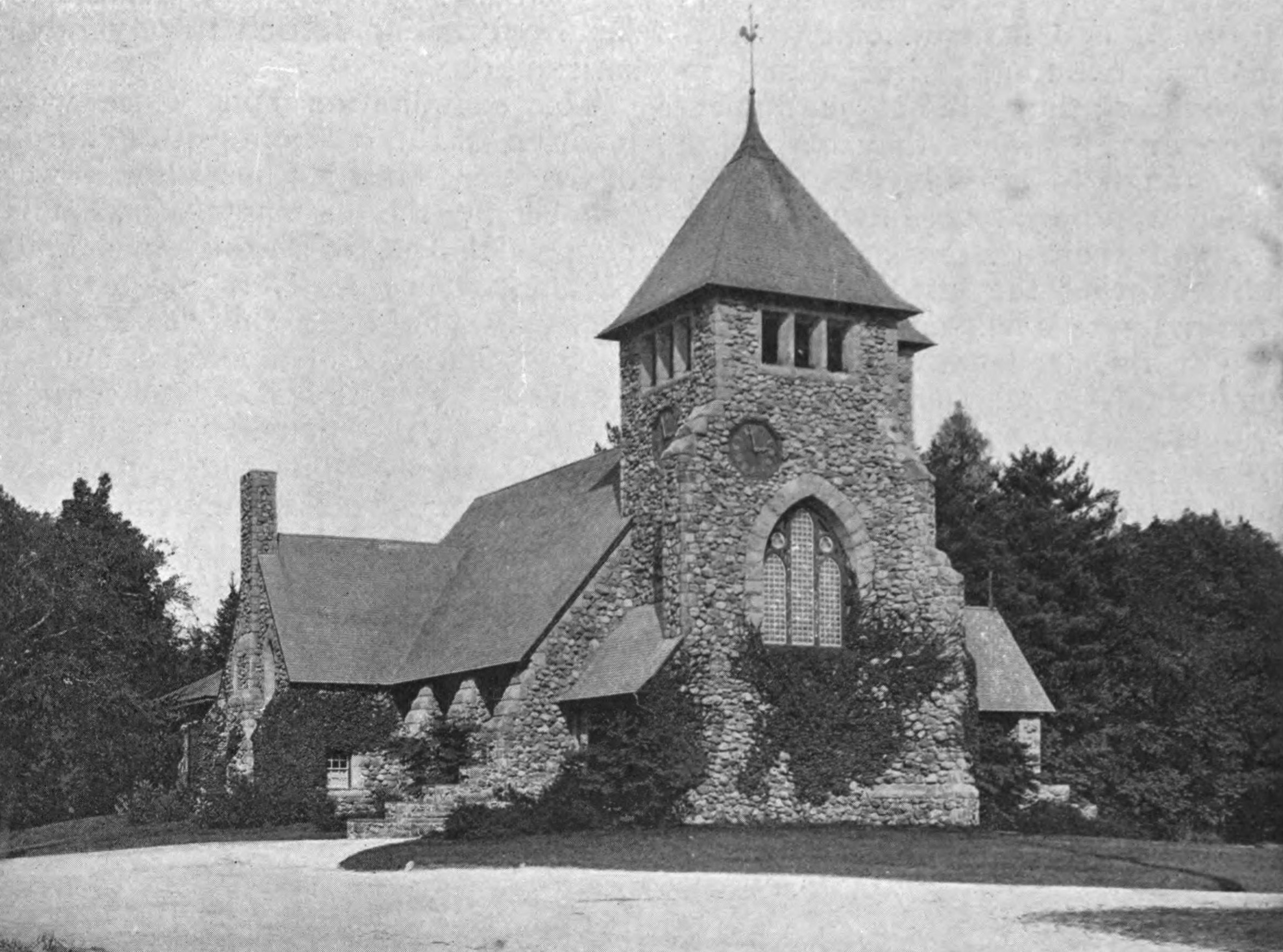
Church in 1896

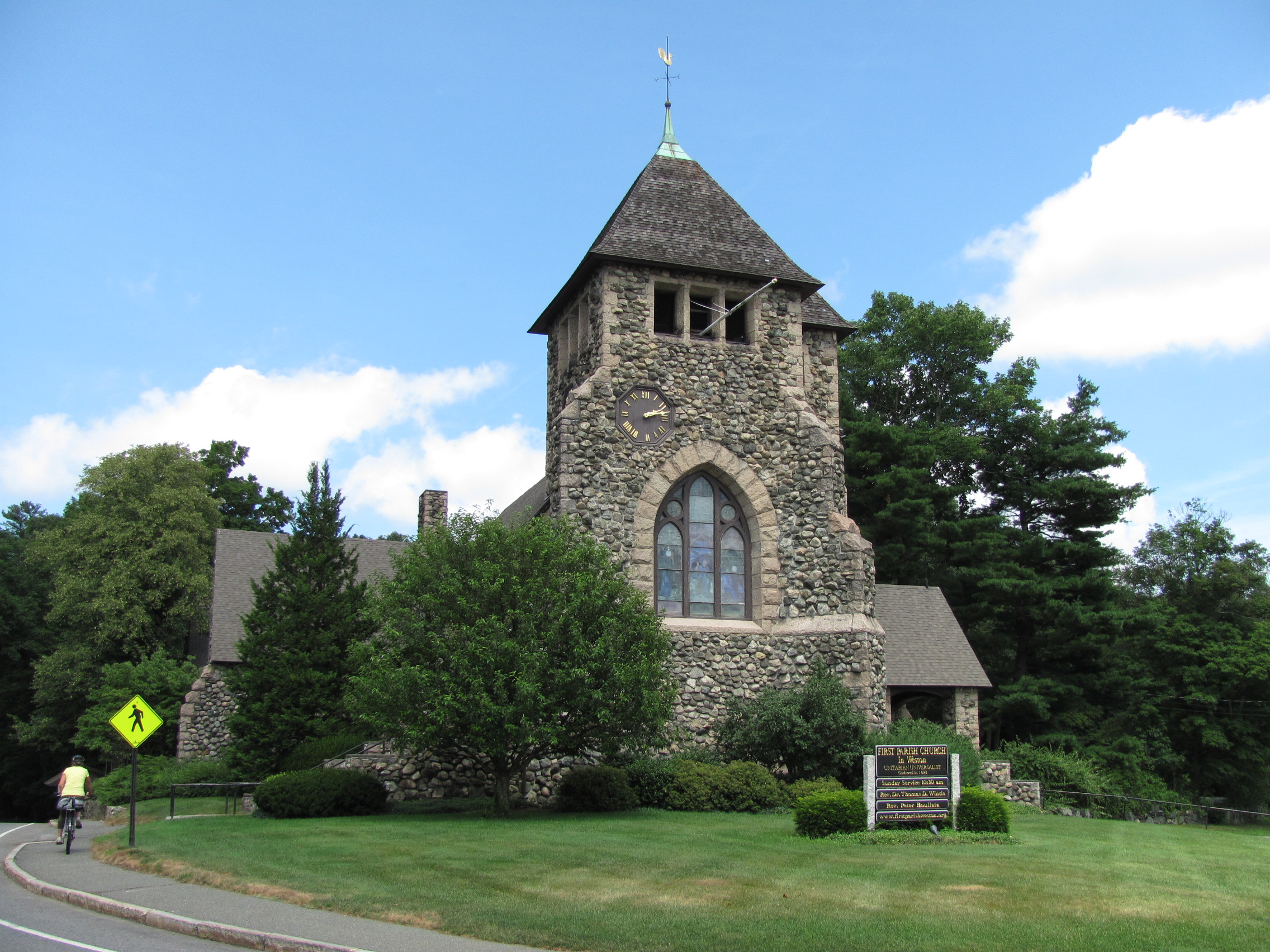
Church in 2010

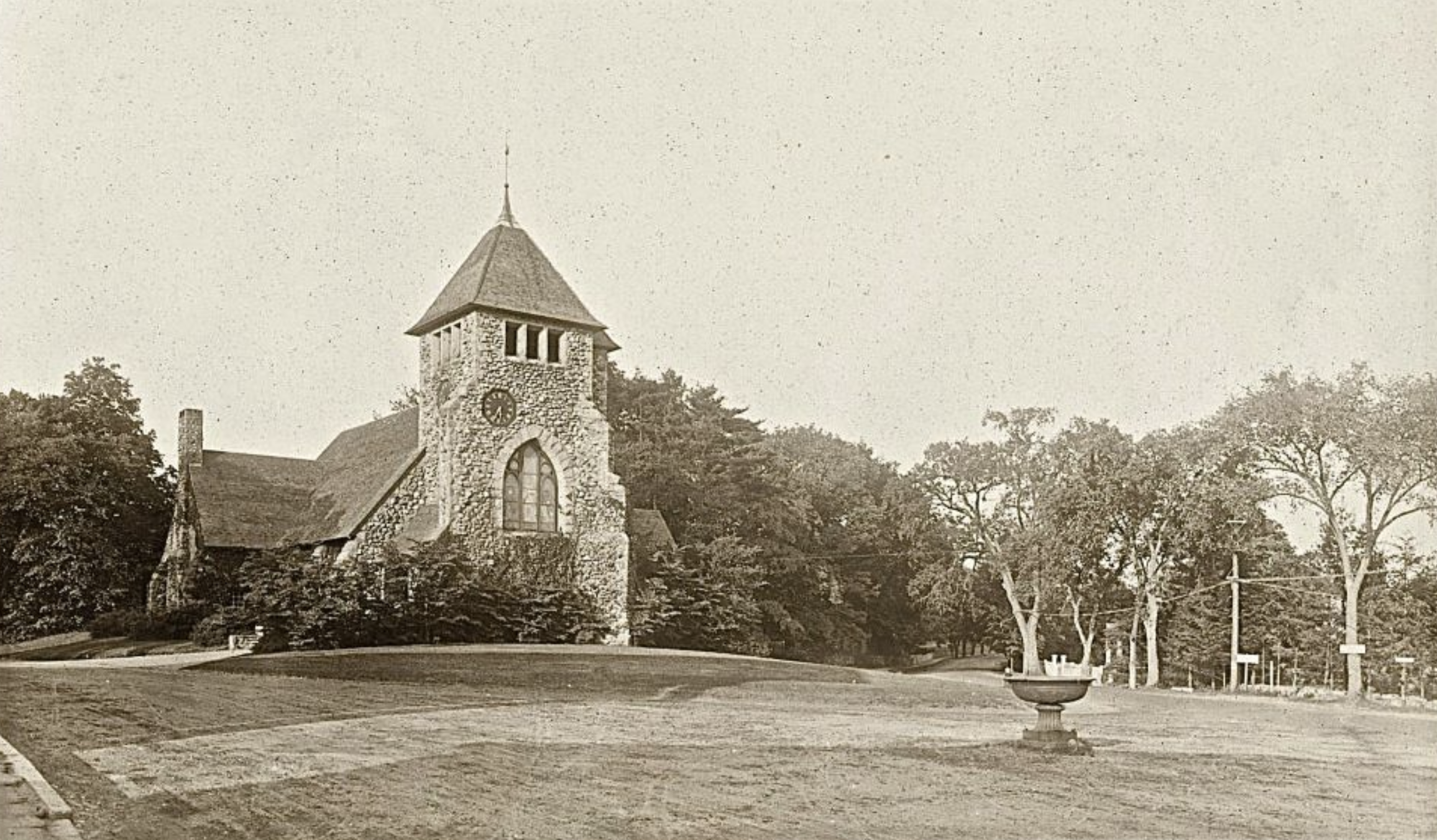
Church pre-1896
