= Weston, Massachusetts =

- Town
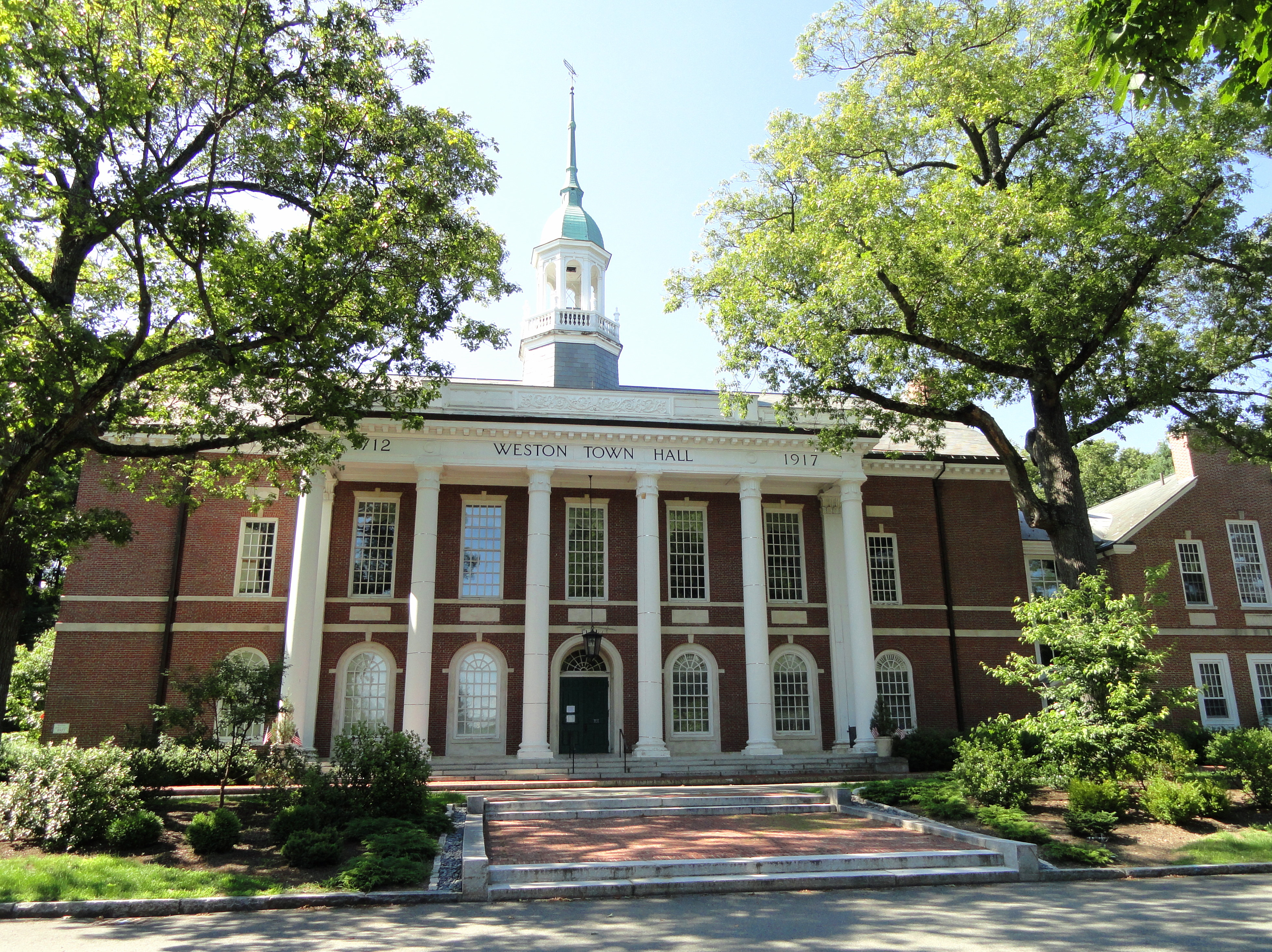
- Town Hall

- Seal

- Location in Middlesex County in Massachusetts

- Location within Greater Boston area Location within Massachusetts Location within the United States
- Coordinates: 42°22′00″N 71°18′11″W
- Country: United States
- State: Massachusetts
- County: Middlesex
- Settled: 1642
- Incorporated: 1713

Government
  - Town Manager: Leon Gaumond Jr.

Area
  - Total: 17.3 sq mi (44.9 km^{2})
  - Land: 17.0 sq mi (44.1 km^{2})
  - Water: 0.31 sq mi (0.8 km^{2})
- Elevation: 180 ft (55 m)

Population (2020)
  - Total: 11,851
  - Density: 696/sq mi (269/km^{2})
- Time zone: UTC-5 (Eastern)
  - Summer (DST): UTC-4 (Eastern)
- ZIP Code: 02493
- Area code: 781 / 339
- FIPS code: 25-77255
- GNIS feature ID: 0618245
- Website: www.westonma.gov

Weston is a town in Middlesex County, Massachusetts, United States, located approximately 15 miles (24 km) west of Boston. At the time of the 2020 United States census, the population of Weston was 11,851.

Weston was incorporated in 1713, and protection of the town's historic resources is driven by the Weston Historical Commission and Weston Historical Society. The town has one Local Historic District, 10 National Register Districts, 26 Historic Areas, and seven houses individually listed on the National Register of Historic Places.

Weston's predominance as a residential community is reflected in its population density, which is among the lowest of Boston's suburbs near or within Route 128. More than 2,000 acres, or 18 percent of the town's total acreage, have been preserved as parks, fields, wetlands, and forests, with 90 miles of trails for hiking, horseback riding, and cross-country skiing. Thirty-seven scenic roads, as defined by Massachusetts law, maintain the town's aesthetic value and historical significance, affording Weston a semi-rural ambiance.

== History ==
The description of Weston's history here is pulled directly from the 2017 Weston Open Space and Recreation Plan.

=== Early years ===
Weston was originally part of the Watertown settlement of 1630, but until the end of the century, the land was used mainly for grazing cattle. In 1698, "The Farms" was set off as a separate precinct with its own meetinghouse; and in 1712–1713, the "Farmers' Precinct" was incorporated as a separate town, Weston.

Early settlers discovered that the amount of useful agricultural land was limited, as was the potential for water-powered industries. Weston did have one advantage: it was situated along the main route west from Boston. By the 18th century, residents were providing services to travelers on the Boston Post Road. Two taverns of great historical and architectural importance remain today: the Josiah Smith Tavern and the Golden Ball Tavern, which is now a museum. North Avenue was an important route to the northwest and, like the Post Road, hosted shops, blacksmiths, and taverns serving travelers.

Grist and sawmills were established beginning in the 17th century on Stony Brook and in the Crescent Street area. Two important manufacturing enterprises were begun during the Colonial period: the Hews redware pottery on Boston Post Road and Hobbs Tannery on North Avenue. By 1776, Weston's population of 1,027 was spread throughout the town on scattered farms along major roads, with some consolidation within the village center around the meetinghouse, along the length of the Post Road, and on North Avenue.

The opening of the Worcester Turnpike in 1810 (now Route 9) drew some commercial traffic from the Boston Post Road, but dry goods merchants continued to supply neighboring towns until about 1830–1840. The Boston and Worcester Railroad was built through the southeast corner of town in 1834, and the Fitchburg Railroad (later the Boston and Maine) was built along Stony Brook on the north side of town around 1844. Population continued to grow, supported in part by small industries such as the pottery, tannery and related boot and shoe making, school desk and chair factory, tool factories, and shops making machinery for cotton and woolen mills. The Hook & Hastings Company organ factory, Weston's largest industry, moved to the North Avenue area in 1888 and was a major town employer until it closed during the Great Depression. The Mass Central Railroad, the third to serve Weston, commenced service in 1881. Its tracks ran east–west through the center of town.

The rural landscape of Weston and convenience to rail transportation also made it attractive as a summer resort area. The shingle-style Drabbington Lodge, once a popular summer resort, remains on North Avenue and is now a senior living community.

=== The estate era ===
Development of country estates in Weston began on a small scale in the 1860s and was widespread by 1900. Wealthy businessmen were attracted to Weston by its convenience to Boston, quiet country atmosphere, and low taxes, as well as the beauty of the area and that same rocky topography that in earlier years had proved unsuitable for farming. By the turn of the century, Weston was described as a "country town of residences of the first class."

Population growth and the influence of large estate owners led to the construction of new institutional buildings, such as the fieldstone First Parish Church (1888), designed by the nationally known Boston firm of Peabody and Stearns and located on the site of earlier church meetinghouses. The first library (1899), central fire station (1914), and present town hall (1917) were also built during the estate era. Coinciding with the town's Bicentennial in 1913, an ambitious Town Improvement Plan began the process of creating the Town Green by draining and landscaping an existing wetland.

Suburban development began in the early 20th century and increased with the advent of the automobile. Two prominent estates, the Winsor estate on Meadowbrook Road and Hubbard estate on the south side, were subdivided after World War I. In the 1910s and 1920s, estates were purchased for educational use (Regis College and Weston College/Campion Center) and as golf courses (Weston Golf Club and Pine Brook Country Club). Many other large properties remained as open farm fields or woodlands through the Great Depression and World War II.

The Weston Aqueduct and Reservoir (1901–1903) and Hultman Aqueduct and Norumbega Reservoir (1938–1940) were major public works projects constructed as part of the water supply system of greater Boston.

=== Post-war growth ===
After World War II, construction of Routes 128 and the Massachusetts Turnpike, along with pent up demand for housing, led to subdivision of former estate properties and farms throughout the town. The postwar period was characterized by exponential growth and proactive efforts to control and guide this growth in order to preserve the rural character of the town. In the early 1950s, Weston's selectmen initiated two important growth-control measures: a zoning bylaw increasing the amount of land needed to build and a land-acquisition policy reducing the amount of developable land by purchasing it for the town. More than half of the town's housing stock was built in the thirty years between 1950 and 1979 and consisted largely of single family houses on increasingly expensive land. Population growth brought increased demand for town services including schools, and five new schools were constructed between 1950 and 1969. In recent years, the major trend is for many of these postwar houses to be replaced by much larger houses.

== Geography ==
According to the U.S. Census Bureau, the town has a total area of 17.3 square miles (45 km^{2}), of which 17.0 square miles (44 km^{2}) is land and 0.3 square miles (0.78 km^{2}), or 1.85%, is water.

The town is bordered by Newton and Waltham on the east; Wellesley to the south; Natick and Wayland to the west; and Lincoln to the north.

== Demographics ==
Historical population
Year	Pop.	±%
1790	1,010	—
1850	1,205	+19.3%
1860	1,243	+3.2%
1870	1,261	+1.4%
1880	1,448	+14.8%
1890	1,664	+14.9%
1900	1,834	+10.2%
1910	2,106	+14.8%
1920	2,282	+8.4%
1930	3,332	+46.0%
1940	3,590	+7.7%
1950	5,026	+40.0%
1960	8,261	+64.4%
1970	10,870	+31.6%
1980	11,169	+2.8%
1990	10,200	−8.7%
2000	11,469	+12.4%
2010	11,261	−1.8%
2020	11,851	+5.2%
2022*	11,661	−1.6%
* = population estimate. Source: United States census records and Population Estimates Program data.

As of the census of 2000, there were 11,469 people, 3,718 households, and 2,992 families residing in the town. The population density was 674.0 inhabitants per square mile (260.2/km^{2}). There were 3,825 housing units at an average density of 224.8 per square mile (86.8/km^{2}). The racial makeup of the town was 90.26% White, 1.18% African American, 0.05% Native American, 6.82% Asian, 0.05% Pacific Islander, 0.43% from other races, and 1.21% from two or more races. Hispanic or Latino of any race were 1.90% of the population.

There were 3,718 households, out of which 42.3% had children under the age of 18 living with them, 73.1% were married couples living together, 5.6% had a female householder with no husband present, and 19.5% were non-families. 17.2% of all households were made up of individuals, and 10.5% had someone living alone who was 65 years of age or older. The average household size was 2.85 and the average family size was 3.21.

In the town, the population was spread out, with 28.0% under the age of 18, 7.3% from 18 to 24, 20.4% from 25 to 44, 27.8% from 45 to 64, and 16.5% who were 65 years of age or older. The median age was 42 years. For every 100 females, there were 86.6 males. For every 100 females age 18 and over, there were 79.6 males.

The median income for a household in the town was $153,918 and the median income for a family was $200,000+, figures that had risen to $189,041 and over $230,000 by 2007. Males had a median income of $100,000 versus $58,534 for females. The per capita income for the town was $105,640. About 2.1% of families and 2.9% of the population were below the poverty line, including 1.8% of those under age 18 and 3.9% of those age 65 or over.

== Arts and culture ==
=== Weston Public Library ===
The Weston Public Library (WPL), with holdings of 209,000, offers services and programs for adults and youth. The Friends of the Weston Public Library provides financial support for the library's Local History Room, curates an ongoing rotation of art created by local artists, organizes a series of musical concerts in the library's community room, and funds passes to Boston-area museums.

=== Weston Art and Innovation Center ===
The Weston Art and Innovation Center, which opened in September 2019 in Weston's Old Library, offers hands-on learning opportunities related to art and technology. The Weston Media Center also relocated to the WAIC.

=== Weston Media Center ===
The Weston Media Center is Weston's independent, non-profit cable TV station and media hub. The Media Center has operated since 2009.

=== Weston Friendly Society ===
The Weston Friendly Society, founded in 1885, is the second oldest community theatre in the United States. WFS performs musicals in the auditorium of Weston Town Hall several times a year. WFS donates money from its productions to local charitable causes.

=== Acme Theater Productions ===
Acme Theater moved from nearby Maynard in 2024, residing in the United Methodist Church at the intersection of Conant Avenue and North Avenue. Acme performs four main stage shows each season and Acme Improv performs four improv shows each season.

=== Periodicals ===
The Weston Observer, a nonprofit weekly print newspaper and accompanying website, began publishing in September 2025. It covers news, town governance, school and sports, culture, people, and events. It features regular guest columnists on topics such as local wildlife and parenting concerns, and invites letters to the editor. It launched with an editorial staff of three and a part-time ad salesperson. It is governed by a volunteer board of directors, and is funded by donations and advertising. The printed newspaper (typically 12 pages) is delivered free to every address in Weston.

Features and columns of interest to Weston residents are published in WellesleyWeston, a quarterly magazine launched in 2005. The magazine is available in the Weston Public Library.

=== Religious institutions ===
- First Parish Church, Unitarian Universalist
- St. Peter's Episcopal Church

=== Points of interest ===
- Abel Allen House
- Boston Post Road Historic District
- Case Estates
- Case's Corner Historic District
- Charles River Reservation Parkways
- Edward Peirce House, Henderson House of Northeastern University
- Glen Road Historic District
- Golden Ball Tavern
- Harrington House
- Isaac Hobbs House
- Kendall Green Historic District
- Mass Central Rail Trail—Wayside
- National Register of Historic Places in Weston
- Norumbega Tower
- Rev. Samuel Woodward House
- Samuel Train House
- Silver Hill Historic District
- Spellman Museum of Stamps & Postal History
- Wellington Farm Historic District
- Weston Aqueduct
- Weston Aqueduct Linear District
- Weston Observatory, a geophysical research and science education center of the Department of Earth and Environmental Sciences at Boston College.
- Weston Reservoir
- Weston Ski Track, open from December to March at Leo J. Martin Golf Course for cross-country skiing and snow shoeing.
- Weston Station (MBTA)

== Government ==
The Town of Weston is governed by a three member Select Board which appoints a full-time Town Manager to lead the community. The current Town Manager is Leon A. Gaumond Jr. who was appointed in 2018.

As of December 2017, there were 7,632 active registered voters in Weston, with 501 voters listed as inactive. Among party enrollees, 1,869 were Democrats, and 1,211 Republicans, with the balance unenrolled.

Like much of New England, Weston has trended strongly Democratic on the federal level in recent years. Weston supported Ronald Reagan in 1980 and 1984, as well as George H. W. Bush in 1988, against home state Governor Mike Dukakis for president of the United States. However, it supported Bill Clinton in 1992, and has supported the Democratic candidate in every election since then, including Barack Obama over Mitt Romney, and Hillary Clinton over Donald Trump.

Weston is located entirely within Massachusetts's 5th congressional district.

Weston is represented in the Massachusetts Senate by Michael J. Barrett (D) and in the Massachusetts House of Representatives by Alice H. Peisch (D).

Massachusetts is represented in the United States Senate by senior Senator Elizabeth Warren and junior Senator Ed Markey.

== Education ==
=== Public elementary and secondary schools ===
Weston Public Schools operates five schools:

- Country School and Woodland School
- Field School (grades 4–5)
- Weston Middle School (grades 6–8)
- Weston High School (grade 9–12)

Districtwide enrollment during the 2022–2023 school year was 2,000 students. Among all Weston residents eligible to pursue elementary and secondary education in 2022, 79 percent attended public schools, primarily in Weston. WPS has participated in the METCO program since 1967.

=== Private elementary and secondary schools ===
- Cambridge School of Weston
- Gifford School
- Meadowbrook School of Weston
- Rivers School

=== Undergraduate and graduate institutions ===
- Pope St. John XXIII National Seminary
- Regis College

According to the 2010 U.S. Census, 83 percent of Weston's population over 25 years possesses a bachelor's degree.

== Infrastructure ==
=== Transportation ===
The Massachusetts Turnpike (Interstate 90) traverses Weston in an east-to-west direction in the southern portion of town. The shared highway routes of Interstate 95 and Massachusetts State Route 128 pass in a north-to-south direction on the town's eastern edge. The intersection of the Massachusetts Turnpike and Route 128 is located in southeastern Weston.

Several local state highways – U.S. Route 20 (Boston Post Road), Massachusetts State Route 30 (South Avenue), and Massachusetts State Route 117 (North Avenue) – also travel east and west through the town in addition to the Massachusetts Turnpike.

As for public transportation, Weston is conveniently served by Kendal Green Station on the Fitchburg Line of the MBTA Commuter Rail system. Inbound trips from Kendal Green to Boston's North Station terminus take approximately 37 minutes, while outbound service to Wachusett Station in the city of Fitchburg takes approximately 1 hour 12 minutes. The town of Weston previously had two other MBTA Commuter Rail stations – Silver Hill and Hastings – both of which were eliminated from regular service in April 2021 following previous years of low ridership and a drastic change in travel patterns associated with the COVID-19 pandemic. Silver Hill was later reopened on November 18, 2024, though it still continues to be the least used station.

The eastern border of Weston (immediately adjacent to the Route 128 highway) comes within one mile of more frequent MBTA transit operations. Riverside Station – a park-and-ride facility which serves the Green Line “D” Branch in the neighboring city of Newton – offers service to Downtown Boston and its northern terminus at Union Square in Somerville at intervals of 6 to 12 minutes due to its classification as a rapid transit service as opposed to commuter train service. The station is close enough that Weston residents living in the southeastern part of town can easily reach Riverside Station by car in roughly five minutes or arrive via bicycle in 13 minutes. Also just across the eastern border of Weston in the neighboring city of Waltham lies the beginning of MBTA Bus Route 70 at two separate terminus points: the Cedarwood bus stop, located at the intersection of U.S. Highway Route 20 and Cedarwood Avenue with limited rush hour-only bus service; and the Market Place Drive bus stop, located near the intersection of Massachusetts State Route 117 and Stow Street offering more frequent bus departures seven days a week. Inbound MBTA Bus Route 70 service travels from either Cedarwood or Market Place Drive to Central Square in Cambridge to connect with the MBTA Red Line.

Another local bus route – MBTA Bus Route 558 – technically crosses the border into Weston. However, no bus stops for this route are located within Weston as its only purpose of entering the town is to gain immediate access to the Route 128 highway for a short express trip to Riverside Station. Service on Bus Route 558 currently travels from Riverside to Newton Corner on weekdays only.

== Notable people ==
- Anant Agarwal — professor of computer engineering at MIT and CEO of edX
- Henry T. Brown — chemical engineer and first African American town official
- Frederic C. Dumaine, Jr. — business executive and chairman of the Massachusetts Republican Party from 1963–1965
- Gertrude Fiske — painter
- David Frank — producer, composer, classically trained pianist, and founding member of the 1980s R&B group The System
- Sarah Fuller — author and educator who taught Helen Keller
- Jeremy Jacobs — owner of the Boston Bruins
- Mindy Kaling – actress, grew up in Weston
- Stephen D. Lebovitz — CEO of CBL & Associates Properties
- Grover Norquist — founder and president of Americans for Tax Reform
- Stephen Pagliuca — managing director of Bain Capital, co-owner of the Boston Celtics
- J. Edward Pawlick (1927–2007) —lawyer, publisher and anti-gay activist, died at Weston
- Edmund Hamilton Sears (1810–1876)— minister, abolitionist, and author of "It Came upon the Midnight Clear"
- Anne Sexton — Pulitzer Prize-winning poet
- Amelia Vega — winner of the Miss Universe beauty pageant in 2003
- Robert Winsor — prominent American banker and financier of the early 20th century
- Benjamin Loring Young

=== Sports figures ===
- Ted Alfond — minority owner of the Boston Red Sox
- Steve Belkin — owner of the Atlanta Hawks and formerly the Thrashers
- M. L. Carr — former Boston Celtics player and head coach
- Zdeno Chara — former Boston Bruins player
- Adrián González — former Boston Red Sox player
- John Harland — golf
- Matt Hasselbeck — former NFL quarterback
- John Havlicek — former Boston Celtics player
- Al Horford — Boston Celtics player
- Kyrie Irving — current Brooklyn Nets player, former Boston Celtics player
- Isaiah Kacyvenski — former NFL player
- Cedric Maxwell — former Boston Celtics player and current radio announcer
- Tom Nalen – former Denver Broncos player
- Bobby Orr — player for Boston Bruins
- David Ortiz — Boston Red Sox DH/1B
- James Pallotta — owner of the Boston Celtics and AS Roma; founder of Raptor Capital Management
- Robert Parish — former Boston Celtics player
- Jerry Remy — former Boston Red Sox player and longtime TV announcer
- Willard Rice — 1924 Olympic hockey player
- Lee Stempniak — former Boston Bruins player
- Jeff Vinik — owner of the Tampa Bay Lightning and minority owner of the Boston Red Sox
- Field Yates – sports analyst
- Kevin Youkilis — former Boston Red Sox player
