= J. Edward Pawlick =

American newspaper publisher

J. Edward Pawlick (27 April 1927, in New York City – 7 October 2007, in Weston, Massachusetts) was a Massachusetts lawyer, publisher and anti-gay activist.

In 1972 Pawlick started Massachusetts Lawyers Weekly which he sold to his daughter, Susan P. Hall, in the 1990s. She developed the paper into a chain of 14 papers, including Lawyers Weekly USA, which has national distribution. The papers were sold to Dolan Media in 2004 for an undisclosed sum, estimated to be over $10 million.

In 1998 Pawlick launched the conservative Massachusetts News, first as a website and then also as a hardcopy newspaper. He used the newspaper to express his right-wing philosophy. For several years, it was distributed free of charge monthly to a targeted audience in Massachusetts and surrounding areas. It gained popularity amongst conservatives for its exposés on state corruption, the perceived inequities of the state probate court, as well as anti-abortion and anti-gay causes. At the same time, Pawlick was producing and distributing pamphlets promoting his philosophy, with particular emphasis on his opposition to gay and lesbian rights.

== Bibliography ==
- 1968: How to Avoid Being Overcharged by Your Life Insurance Salesman
- 1998: Freedom Will Conquer Racism and Sexism
- 2003: Libel by New York Times
