= Wellington Farm Historic District =

Historic district in Massachusetts, United States

- U.S. National Register of Historic Places
- U.S. Historic district
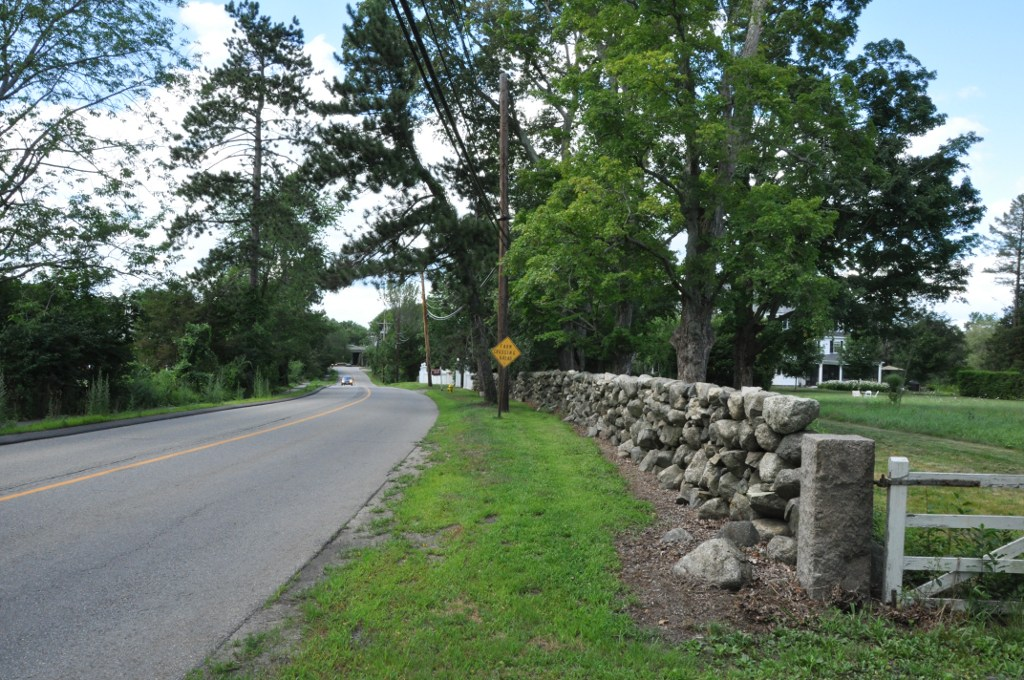

- Location within Massachusetts Location within the United States
- Location: 487-500 Wellesley St., Weston, Massachusetts
- Coordinates: 42°19′58″N 71°18′25″W
- Area: 35 acres (14 ha)
- Architect: Chandler, Joseph Everrett
- Architectural style: Colonial Revival, Georgian, Federal
- NRHP reference No.: 88000426
- Added to NRHP: April 14, 1988

The Wellington Farm Historic District encompasses a historic farm property at 487—500 Wellesley Street in Weston, Massachusetts. Included in the 35-acre (14 ha) district are a main house built c. 1760, a barn complex with buildings dating from the 19th and 20th centuries, a modern greenhouse, and farm fields lined by stone walls. It is historically significant for its well-preserved buildings, and for its later transformation into a summer estate. It is also one of the town's few remaining working farms. The district was listed on the National Register of Historic Places in 1988.

== Description and history ==
The Wellington Farm is set on 35 acres (14 ha) in rural-residential southern Weston. The property is roughly bisected by Wellesley Street, just south of the Massachusetts Turnpike, and is roughly bounded on the south by Glen Road. Open fields line the road, with two separate farmstead complexes on either side. The one to the east has a farmhouse built about 1760, with later modifications around 1800 and 1900, while that on the west side has an early 20th-century house with more modern outbuildings for the farm operations.

Part of this property was first recorded in 1770, when the house on the east side was already standing. By the turn of the 20th century, it had grown to over 100 acres (40 ha), and extended as far west as Winter Street. The property was operated as a farm until the end of the 19th century, at which time it was turned into a summer estate. It was acquired by Arthur Wight Wellington, president of U.S. Leather, in 1907, and remains in that family.

== See also ==
- National Register of Historic Places listings in Weston, Massachusetts
