= Golden Ball Tavern =

- Golden Ball Tavern Museum
- U.S. National Register of Historic Places
- U.S. Historic district – Contributing property
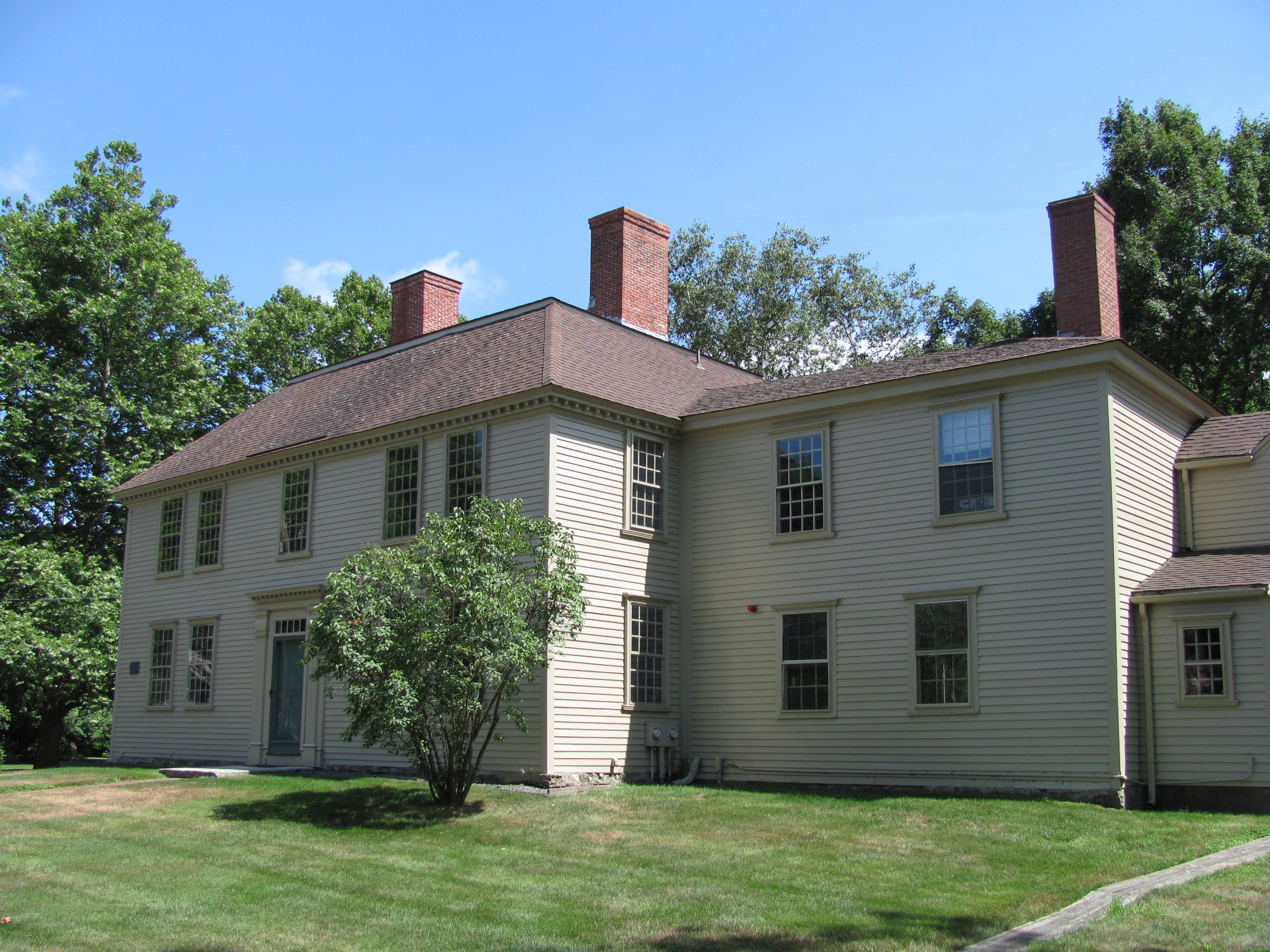
- Golden Ball Tavern Museum

- Location within Massachusetts Location within the United States
- Location: 662 Boston Post Road, Weston, Massachusetts
- Coordinates: 42°21′57″N 71°18′35″W
- Area: 6.3 acres (2.5 ha)
- Built: 1768
- Architectural style: Georgian
- Part of: Boston Post Road Historic District (ID83009783)
- NRHP reference No.: 72000141

Significant dates
- Added to NRHP: September 28, 1972
- Designated CP: February 11, 1983

The Golden Ball Tavern is a historic tavern, now a museum, located in Weston, Massachusetts. Built in 1768, it is one of the town's finest examples of Late Georgian architecture. It also played a pivotal role in local activities during the American Revolution, due to its Loyalist tavern keeper, Isaac Jones. The tavern was listed on the National Register of Historic Places in 1972, and was included in Weston's Boston Post Road Historic District in 1983.

== Description ==
The Golden Ball Tavern stands on the south side of Boston Post Road, near the center of Weston, just east of its junction with Golden Ball Lane. It is a two-story wood frame structure, its main section covered by a hip roof and finished in wooden clapboards. A two-story ell, likely an older house, extends to one side, and a single-story ell to the other. The main entrance is at the center of a five-bay facade, flanked by simple pilasters and topped by a modillioned cornice. The property also has a barn that is believed to date to the main house's construction.

== History ==
The tavern was built in 1768 by Captain Isaac Jones, a local shopkeeper. Jones, a Loyalist, gave shelter to British soldiers - spies sent by General Thomas Gage - who were performing reconnaissance on rebellious activities in 1774. After the Boston Tea Party in December 1773, the tavern was raided by local Patriots, who believed Jones to be serving tea on which hated taxes had been collected. Known locally as the Weston Tea Party, the event consisted of little more than a ransacking of the premises (which had no taxed tea). Later in the Revolution, Jones apparently joined the cause of independence, and regained a position of prominence in the community. His tavern flourished until the early 19th century, when the opening of the Worcester Turnpike siphoned traffic away from the Post Road. The tavern closed about 1805, and was then occupied as a residence by six generations of the Jones family. It then underwent restoration, and has since been opened as a museum.

== See also ==
- National Register of Historic Places listings in Weston, Massachusetts
