= Kendal Green Historic District =

Historic district in Massachusetts, United States

- U.S. National Register of Historic Places
- U.S. Historic district
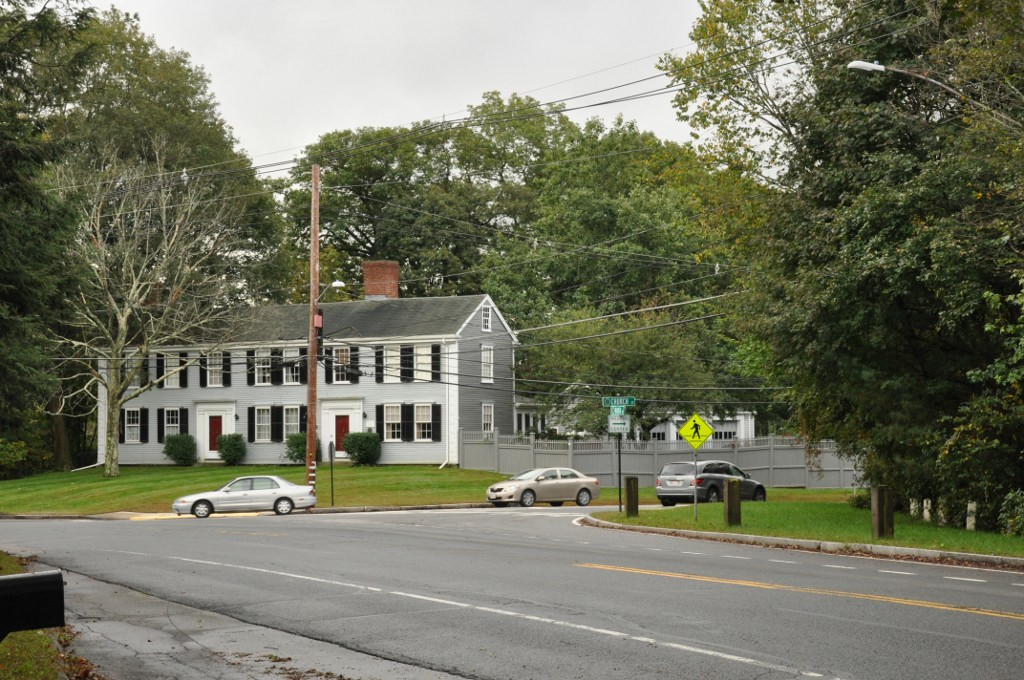
- The corner of North and Church Streets

- Location within Massachusetts Location within the United States
- Location: Weston, Massachusetts
- Coordinates: 42°22′59″N 71°17′11″W
- Architectural style: Colonial, Federal
- NRHP reference No.: 01000121
- Added to NRHP: March 1, 2000

The Kendal Green Historic District is a rural residential district running along North Avenue (Massachusetts Route 117) in Weston, Massachusetts. It extends for about three-quarters of a mile, and includes elements representative of the development of Weston from a rural agricultural community to a residential suburb of Boston. In addition to a variety of predominantly residential and agricultural properties, it includes two formerly industrial sites important in Weston's history: the site of the Hobbs Tannery, and that of the Hook and Hastings Organ Factory. The district was listed on the National Register of Historic Places in 2000.

== Description and history ==
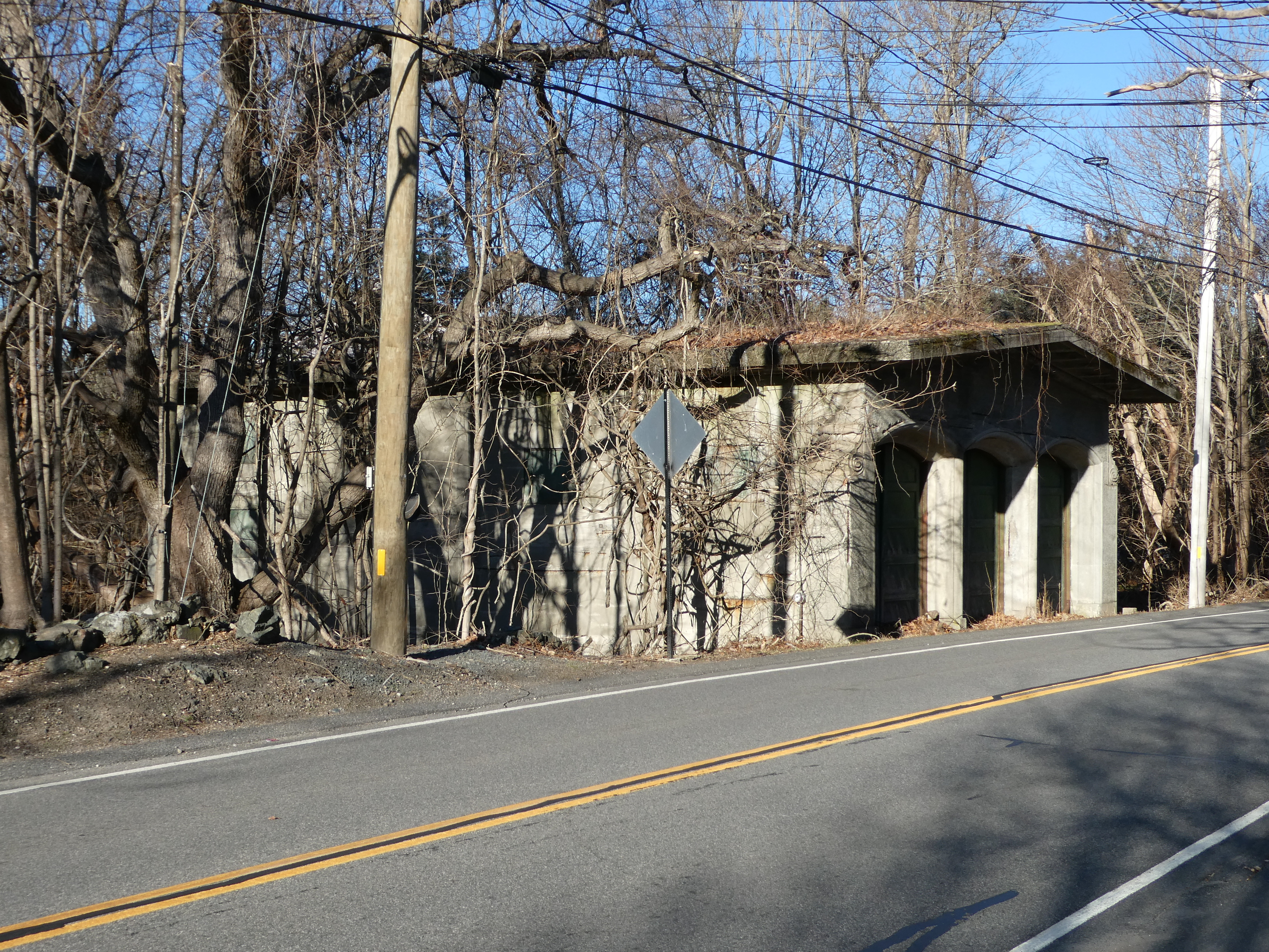
A 1908-built fire station in the district

North Avenue is a through street in northeastern Weston that dates to colonial days, now connecting Waltham to Maynard. It is roughly paralleled to the south by the Fitchburg Railroad, now primarily used as a commuter rail line by the MBTA, with a stop labelled Kendal Green just south of North Avenue on Church Street. The historic district extends along North Avenue between Hobbs Brook Road in the east to Viles Street in the west, where the Hastings commuter rail station is located. Most of the district's properties line North Avenue, with an extension on Church Street to including the historic station building there, and along Viles Street and Brooks Road to include a small industrial area.

The Weston area was first settled in the 17th century, when it was part of Watertown, and North Avenue was one of the loci of early settlement. The oldest building in the district is the c. 1707 Whitney Tavern at 171 North Avenue. In 1729 Josiah Hobbs (for whose family Hobbs Brook is named) purchased much of the land in this area, and also acquired a water right at which he operated a tannery, one of the first such industries in the Massachusetts Bay Colony. Five generations of Hobbses operated the tannery for more than a century, and built a number of surviving houses in the district, including 87, 88, and 121 North Avenue. #87, the Isaac Hobbs House, is separately listed on the National Register.

The railroad, which effectively bounds the district to the south, was built through the area in the 1840s, but did not immediately affect development. In the 1880s the E. and G.G. Hook and Hastings Organ Company built a factory on Viles Street at the railroad, which became the town's largest employer and a significant economic force in its development. Although none of the company's industrial buildings have survived, a significant number of houses on North, Viles and Brooks were built either by the company or by others to house its workers.

== See also ==
- National Register of Historic Places listings in Weston, Massachusetts
