= Glen Road Historic District =

Historic district in Massachusetts, United States

- U.S. National Register of Historic Places
- U.S. Historic district
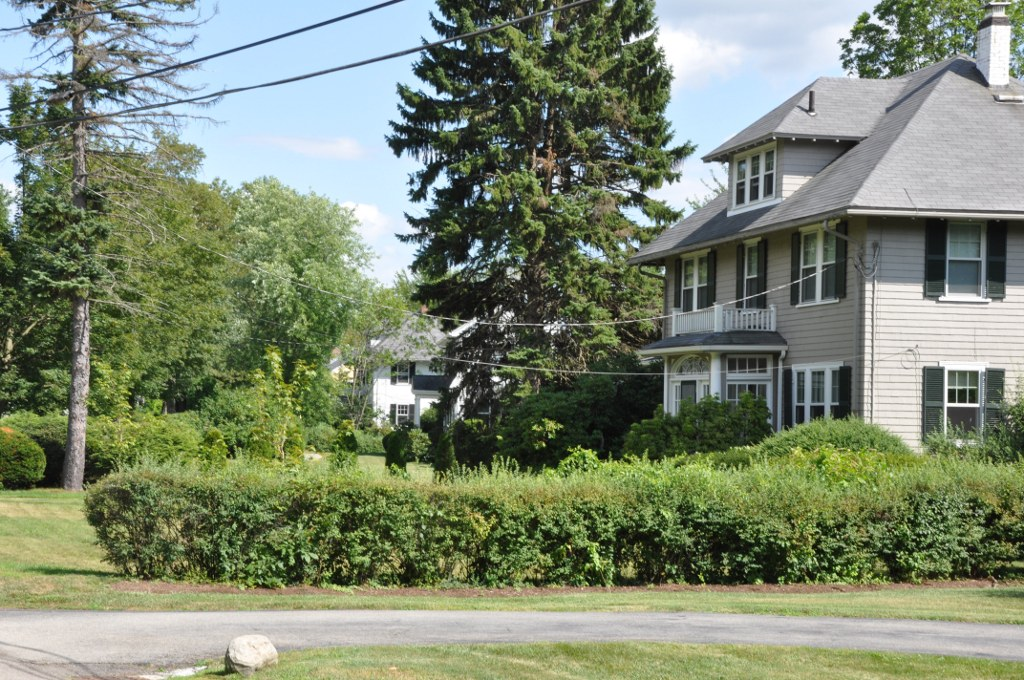

- Location within Massachusetts Location within the United States
- Location: 233-317 Glen Rd., Weston, Massachusetts
- Coordinates: 42°19′32″N 71°17′17″W
- Area: 27 acres (11 ha)
- Architectural style: Federal, Second Empire
- NRHP reference No.: 06000783
- Added to NRHP: September 6, 2006

The Glen Road Historic District is a historic district at 233-317 Glen Road in Weston, Massachusetts. The district encapsulates historical development trends in Weston, in which land began in agricultural uses, and was later transformed into either resort or suburban residential housing. It is also notable for its longtime association with the Jennings family, who owned the land from the 18th century into the 20th, and engaged in all three land uses. The district was listed on the National Register of Historic Places in 2006.

== Description and history ==
The Glen Road Historic District is a linear area of about 27 acres (11 ha), extending along Glen Road in southern Weston, between Oak Street and Pembroke Road. The road is a winding country lane, now lined with suburban residential construction. All of its 28 houses are wood frame structures, either 1-1/2 or 2-1/2 stories in height, and most are finished in either wooden shingles or clapboards. The oldest house in the district is a c. 1732 farmhouse, which is also believed to be the town's oldest surviving building. Most of the other residences were built either as a series of cottages that were part of a hotel complex developed around the turn of the 20th century, or were suburban development from the early decades of the 20th century.

The land through which Glen Road now winds was part of a land grant made in 1642 to William Jennings, when the area was an outer precinct of Watertown. Jennings descendant Nathaniel built the oldest house here, now standing at 266 Glen Road. The second house in the district was built about 1812 by Paul Pratt, now at 317 Glen Road. In the late 19th century, most of the land in the area was consolidated again under Edward Jennings, who operated a dairy farm called Glen Farm. Edward's brother Willard, also a farmer, took in boarders during the summer, beginning a small tourist trade. The house now at 245 Glen Road was expanded as a small hotel with forty rooms, and Willard Jennings added five cottages to establish a small resort complex; four of these still survive. Sometime in the 1920s, the wings of the hotel were destroyed by fire. With the dairy operation in declined in the 1910s, the Jenningses began to subdivide the property, resulting in the construction of most of the other residences in the area.

== See also ==
- National Register of Historic Places listings in Weston, Massachusetts
