= Samuel Train House =

Historic house in Massachusetts, United States

- U.S. National Register of Historic Places
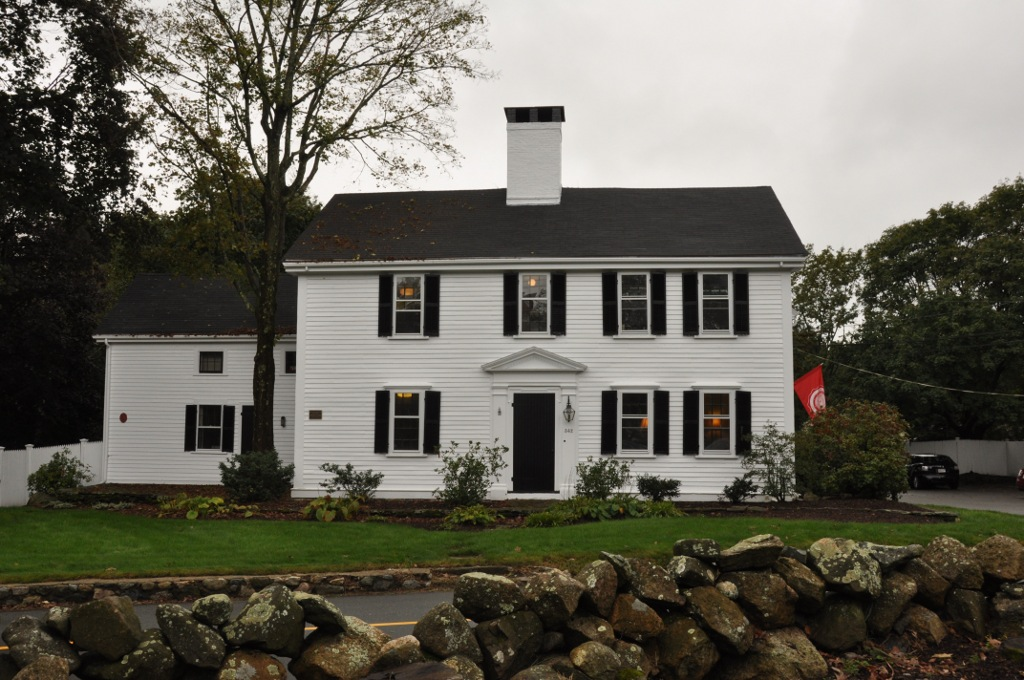

- Location within Massachusetts Location within the United States
- Location: 342 Winter St., Weston, Massachusetts
- Coordinates: 42°19′20″N 71°19′31″W
- Area: 1 acre (0.40 ha)
- Built: 1738
- Architect: Samuel Train
- Architectural style: Colonial
- NRHP reference No.: 76000286
- Added to NRHP: December 12, 1976

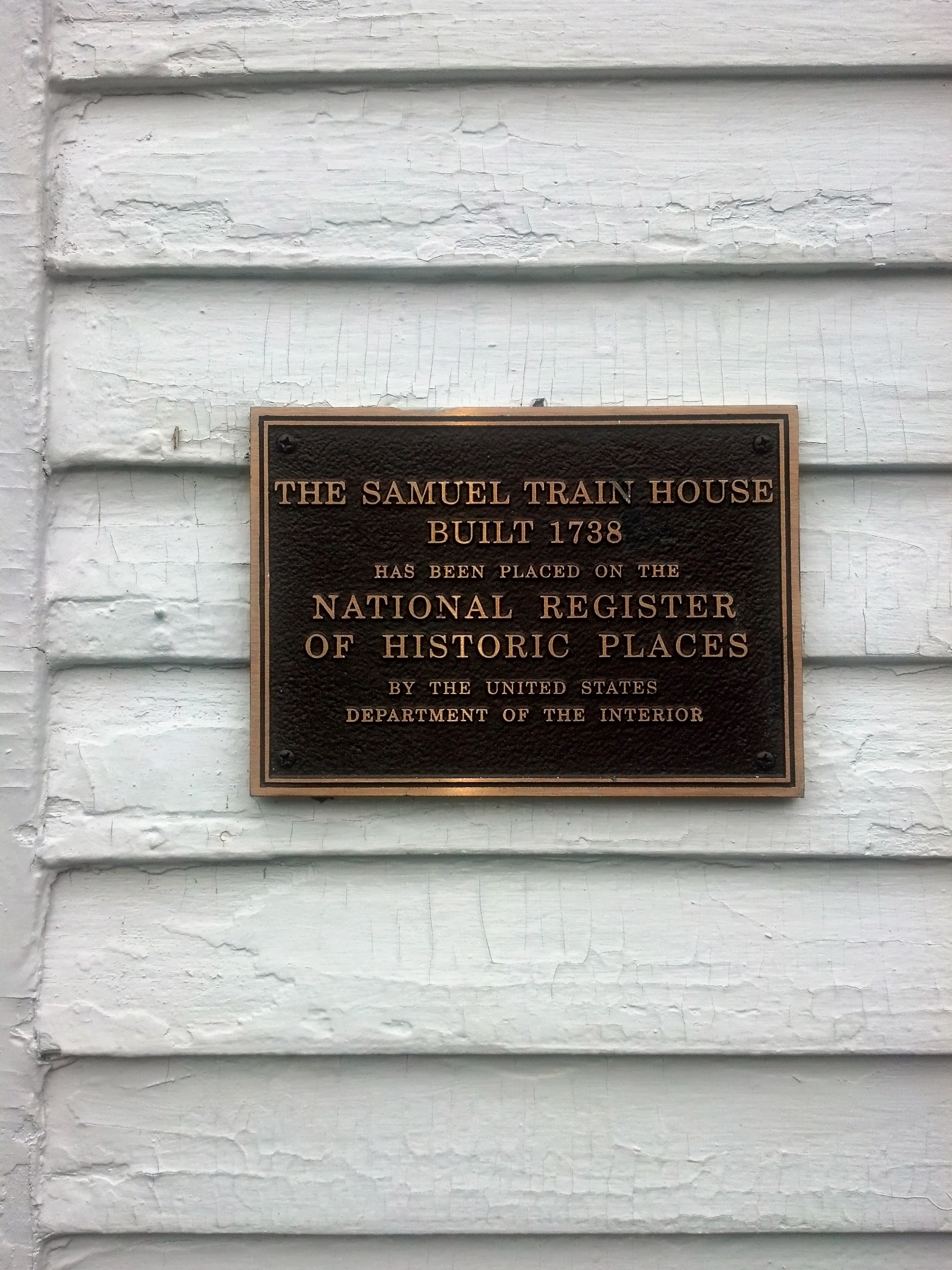
Plaque on the Samuel Train house

The Samuel Train House is a historic house in Weston, Massachusetts, United States. Built about 1738, it is a good example of a mid-18th century colonial house. It was home to successive generations of Samuel Trains, who were all active in local politics and the state militia. The house was added to the National Register of Historic Places in 1976. It is used as office space for the Rivers School, whose main campus is located across the street.

== Description and history ==
The Samuel Train House is located in southern Weston, on the south side of Winter Street at its junction with Bogle Street. It is a 2 1/2-story wood-frame structure, four bays wide, with a side-gable roof and a large central chimney. The chimney has six fireplaces, a bake oven, and a distinctive smoke chamber that is oriented to the front, placed where houses of this period normally have a winding staircase.

The land on which this house stands was purchased by one of three consecutive John Trains in c. 1662. In 1735 Samuel Train, son of the third John Train, purchased 60 acres (24 ha) from his father, and built this house three years later. Samuel was the first of three consecutive Samuels to occupy the house. All three served in the local militia: the first during the French and Indian War, the second in the American Revolutionary War (where he saw action at the Battles of Lexington and Concord), and the third in the War of 1812. The latter two were also instrumental in the establishment of the First Baptist Church of Weston. Samuel I was a town selectman, and Samuel III was a minister and state legislator. Later owners used the house as a milk house for their dairy operation.

== See also ==
- National Register of Historic Places listings in Weston, Massachusetts
