= National Register of Historic Places listings in Weston, Massachusetts =

Weston, Massachusetts has 15 locations listed on the National Register of Historic Places.
This National Park Service list is complete through NPS recent listings posted March 13, 2026.

== Current listings ==
	Name on the Register	Image	Date listed	Location	City or town	Description
1	Abel Allen House	Abel Allen House	January 9, 1978 (#78000465)	South of Weston at 1 Chestnut St. 42°21′16″N 71°18′17″W	Weston	
2	Boston Post Road Historic District	Boston Post Road Historic District	February 11, 1983 (#83000783)	Both sides of the Boston Post Rd. from Plain Rd. to Stony Brook; 42°21′57″N 71°18′30″W	Weston	
3	Case's Corner Historic District	Case's Corner Historic District	September 12, 2002 (#02001038)	School, Wellesley, Newton and Ash Sts. 42°21′29″N 71°17′55″W	Weston	
4	Charles River Reservation Parkways	Charles River Reservation Parkways	January 18, 2006 (#05001530)	Soldiers Field, Nonantum, Leo Birmingham, Arsenal, Greenough, N. Beacon, Charles River, Norumbega, Recreation; 42°21′42″N 71°09′31″W	Weston	Extends into Cambridge, Newton, Waltham, and Watertown in Middlesex County and into Boston in Suffolk County
5	Glen Road Historic District	Glen Road Historic District	September 6, 2006 (#06000783)	233–317 Glen Rd. 42°19′32″N 71°17′17″W	Weston	
6	Golden Ball Tavern	Golden Ball Tavern	September 28, 1972 (#72000141)	662 Boston Post Rd. 42°21′57″N 71°18′35″W	Weston	
7	Harrington House	Harrington House	June 22, 1976 (#76000281)	555 Wellesley St. 42°19′38″N 71°18′39″W	Weston	
8	Isaac Hobbs House	Isaac Hobbs House	June 1, 1982 (#82002747)	87 North Ave. 42°22′48″N 71°16′54″W	Weston	
9	Kendal Green Historic District	Kendal Green Historic District	March 1, 2000 (#01000121)	North Ave., Church, Viles Sts., Brook Rd. 42°22′59″N 71°17′11″W	Weston	
10	Edward Peirce House-Henderson House of Northeastern University	Edward Peirce House-Henderson House of Northeastern University	August 19, 1997 (#97000880)	99 Westcliff Rd. 42°19′23″N 71°17′52″W	Weston	
11	Silver Hill Historic District	Silver Hill Historic District	August 25, 2004 (#04000902)	Silver Hill, Westland Rds., Merriam St. 42°23′34″N 71°18′18″W	Weston	
12	Samuel Train House	Samuel Train House	December 12, 1976 (#76000286)	342 Winter St. 42°19′20″N 71°19′31″W	Weston	
13	Wellington Farm Historic District	Wellington Farm Historic District	April 14, 1988 (#88000426)	487–500 Wellesley St. 42°19′58″N 71°18′25″W	Weston	
14	Weston Aqueduct Linear District	Weston Aqueduct Linear District	January 18, 1990 (#89002274)	Along the Weston Aqueduct from the Sudbury Reservoir to the Weston Reservoir; 42°20′00″N 71°22′32″W	Weston	Extends into Southborough, Worcester County and Framingham and Wayland in Middlesex County.
15	Rev. Samuel Woodward House	Rev. Samuel Woodward House	October 8, 1976 (#76000283)	19 Concord Rd. 42°22′05″N 71°18′21″W	Weston	
