= Abel Allen House =

Historic house in Massachusetts, United States

- The John Sawin Jr. House
- U.S. National Register of Historic Places
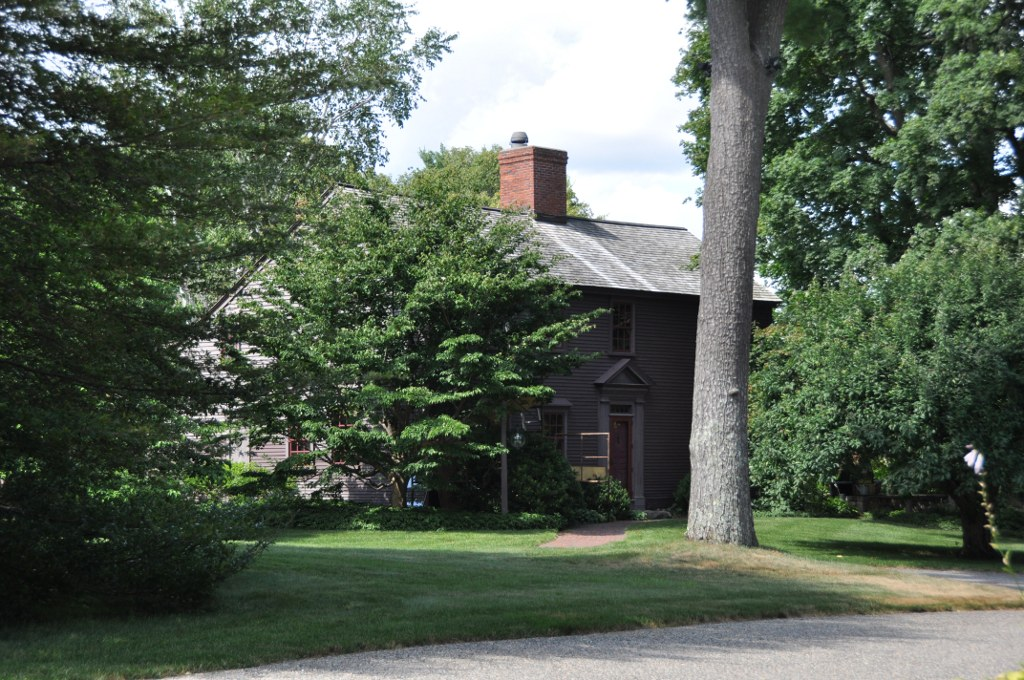

- Location within Massachusetts Location within the United States
- Location: 1 Chestnut Street, Weston, Massachusetts
- Coordinates: 42°21′16″N 71°18′17″W
- Built: 1696
- Architect: John Sawin Jr (original) Thomas Rand (reconstruction) Note: Thomas Rand was a housewright, not an architect in the modern sense. This format acknowledges the multi-phase construction.
- Architectural style: Colonial
- NRHP reference No.: 78000465
- Added to NRHP: January 9, 1978

The Abel Allen House is a historic house located in Weston, Massachusetts.

== Description and history ==
With a construction history dating back to the late 17th century, the house is believed to be the oldest building in Weston, Massachusetts. Although historically associated with Abel Allen, research by the Weston Historical Society in 2020 indicates the house was actually built by John Sawin Jr. on Lot 69 of the original Watertown "Farmlands" between 1696 and 1698.

The house has undergone at least six major construction phases. The original structure built by Sawin was a "half house," three bays wide and two stories high. In 1731, John Sawin Jr.'s heirs sold the property to Ebenezer Allen (Abel Allen’s half-brother), after which it became associated with the Allen family. Around 1760, the housewright Thomas Rand performed an extensive reconstruction, expanding the home into its current form by adding rooms to the east and a two-story ell.

In addition to its extensive architectural history, the building is notable for at least one of its occupants. Thomas Rand, who acquired the house in 1781 after it was confiscated from its Loyalist owner, was a soldier in the American Revolutionary War who served at the Battles of Lexington and Concord, and a housewright who worked on a number of municipal buildings. He also served on the town's board of selectmen during the Revolutionary War years, and filled other municipal offices as well.

The house was listed on the National Register of Historic Places on January 9, 1978.

== See also ==
- National Register of Historic Places listings in Weston, Massachusetts
- List of the oldest houses in Massachusetts
