= Isaac Hobbs House =

Historic house in Massachusetts, United States

- U.S. National Register of Historic Places
- U.S. Historic district – Contributing property
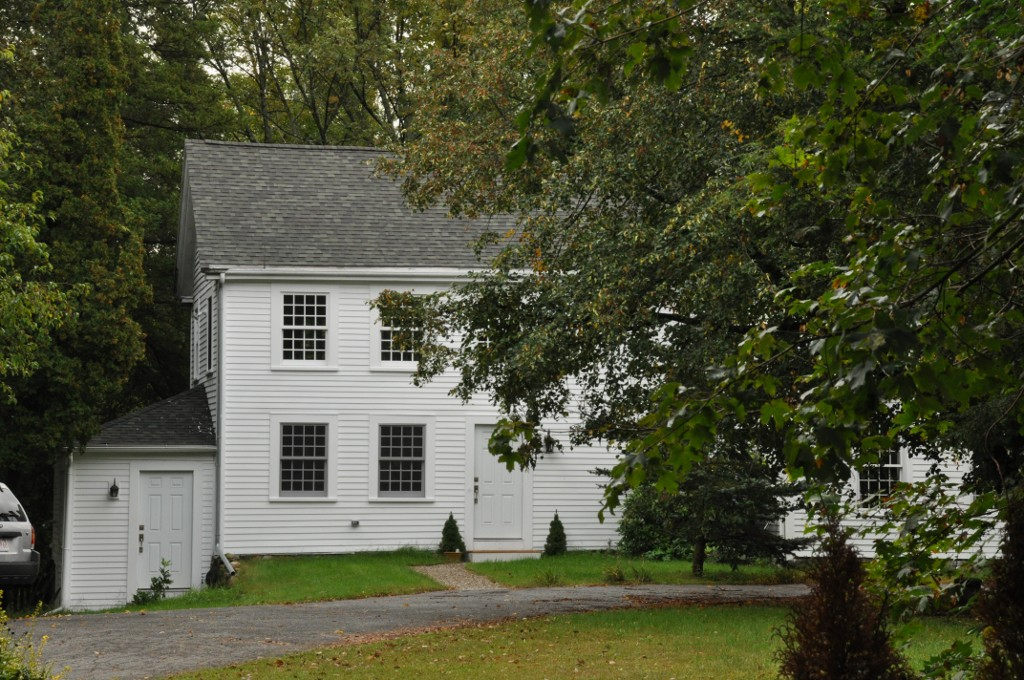

- Location within Massachusetts
- Location: 87 North Avenue, Weston, Massachusetts
- Coordinates: 42°22′48″N 71°16′54″W
- Area: 2.25 acres (0.91 ha)
- Built: 1749
- Architectural style: Georgian
- Part of: Kendal Green Historic District (ID01000121)
- NRHP reference No.: 82002747

Significant dates
- Added to NRHP: June 1, 1982
- Designated CP: March 1, 2000

The Isaac Hobbs House is a historic colonial house in Weston, Massachusetts. It was built about 1749 by Ebenezer Hobbs, a prominent local citizen. His son Isaac was a veteran of the American Revolutionary War and owner of an adjacent tannery that was an important local business. The house was listed on the National Register of Historic Places in 1982, and included in the Kendal Green Historic District on March 1, 2000.

== Description and history ==
The Isaac Hobbs House stands in suburban northeastern Weston, just north of the junction of North Avenue (Massachusetts Route 117) with Church Street in the town's Kendal Green area. It is a 2 1/2-story wood-frame structure, with a gabled roof and clapboarded exterior. It is oriented facing west, and is screened from the road by a fence, although it is located close to the road. The main facade is five bays wide, with a center entrance and a cross gable above the center three bays. A two-story ell extends to the left side, and a small single-story ell projects to the right.

The oldest portion of this house was built about 1749, probably by Ebenezer Hobbs, whose family had acquired the land for it in 1729. Ebenezer's son Isaac was a town selectman, representative in the state legislature, and a member of the Massachusetts militia who saw action in the Battle of Bunker Hill. A later descendant who owned the house was J.F. Baldwin Marshall, paymaster general to the Massachusetts troops in the American Civil War. The family also operated a tannery adjacent to the house, which was a significant business in the town until its closure in 1860, and is now town conservation land.

== See also ==
- National Register of Historic Places listings in Weston, Massachusetts
