= Boston Post Road Historic District (Weston, Massachusetts) =

Historic district in Massachusetts, United States

- U.S. National Register of Historic Places
- U.S. Historic district
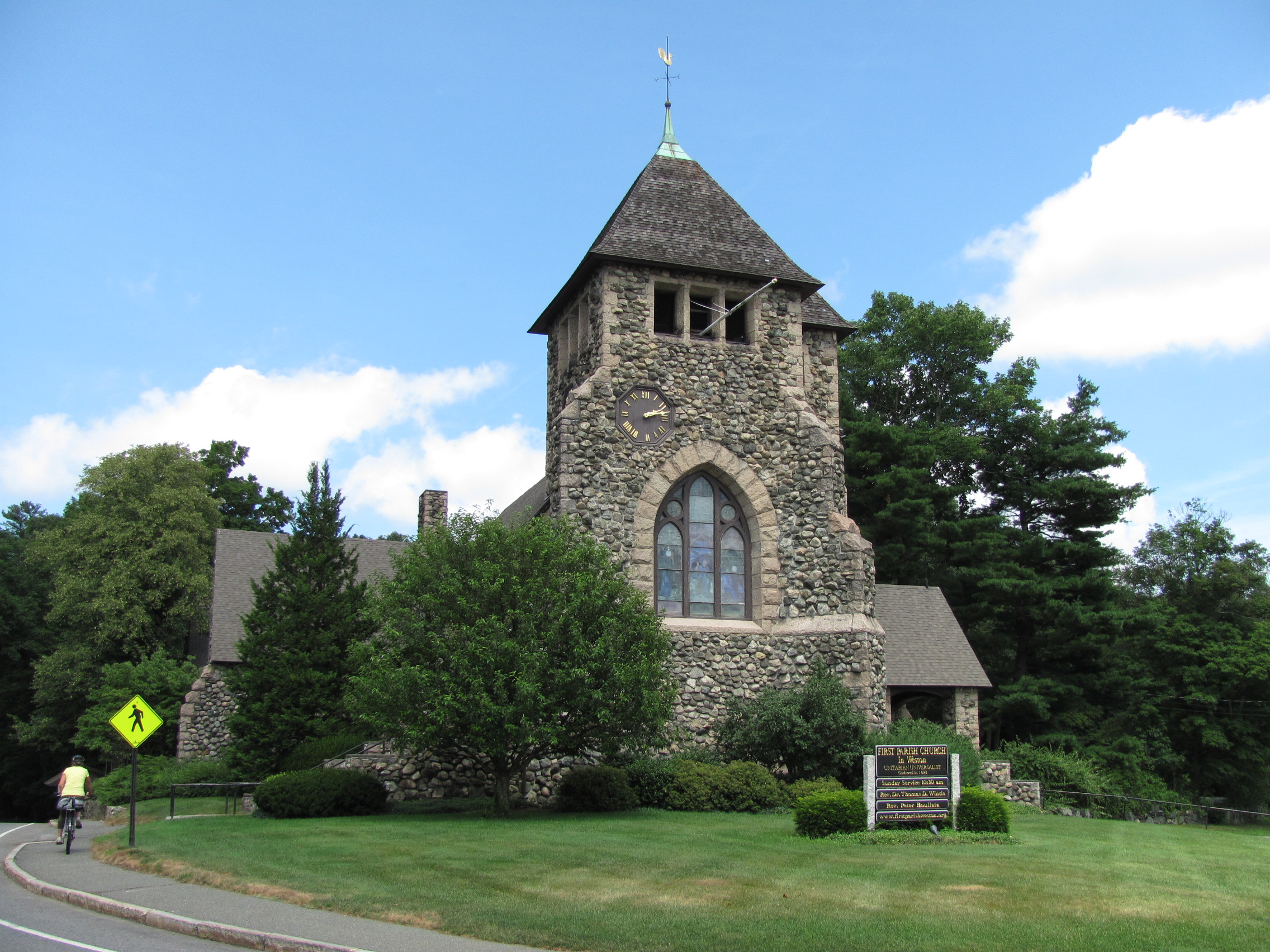
- First Parish Church

- Location within Massachusetts Location within the United States
- Location: US 20 and Boston Post Rd., Weston, Massachusetts
- Coordinates: 42°21′57″N 71°18′30″W
- Area: 760 acres (310 ha)
- Architect: Multiple
- Architectural style: Georgian, Federal
- NRHP reference No.: 83000783
- Added to NRHP: February 11, 1983

The Boston Post Road Historic District encompasses a portion of the historic roadway known as the Boston Post Road, which ran Boston, Massachusetts to Albany, New York. The surviving alignment in Weston, Massachusetts extends along the entire length of United States Route 20, except for a bypassed section that passes through the town's village center. The 3.5 miles (5.6 km) of roadway retains much of the generally rural appearance it had during the late colonial period, and the town center retains significant elements of historic character as well. The district was added to the National Register of Historic Places in 1983.

== Description and history ==
The Boston Post Road was one of the first major roadways to be developed in colonial New England. The section of US 20 in Weston was originally a Native American footpath, and had its first documented use as a post road in 1673. What is now Weston was originally the westernmost precinct of Watertown, and its town center arose around its first meeting house built in 1695. The road was upgraded in 1783 to accommodate stagecoaches. Some of the route's oldest buildings are taverns operated in part to support passing travelers, including the Golden Ball Tavern (1763) and Josiah Smith's (1757). The roadway is in part significant for its importance in the American Revolutionary War, when it was used by Patriot forces to move men and military supplies. Sites of importance along the road include Lamson Park, where Weston's militia mustered before marching to the Battles of Lexington and Concord in 1775, and the Golden Ball Tavern, whose Loyalist owner made it the target of protests. The route gradually declined in importance in the 19th century, as it was supplanted by more directly routed turnpikes. As a result, the roadway has retained much rural character, with only limited encroachment from suburban residential development and the growth of the center to accommodate a larger population.

The historic district extends for the entire length of US 20, some 3-1/2 miles. It also includes a segment of post road that passes through the town center, which was bypassed in 1931. The district is more than 750 acres (300 ha), and includes properties that are generally widely spaced in the eastern and western reaches, with a cluster of development around the village. The latter includes the original town green, the two historic taverns, numerous churches, and town facilities.

== See also ==
- Boston Post Road Historic District (disambiguation)
- National Register of Historic Places listings in Weston, Massachusetts
