= Case Estates =

Botanical garden in Weston, Massachusetts, United States

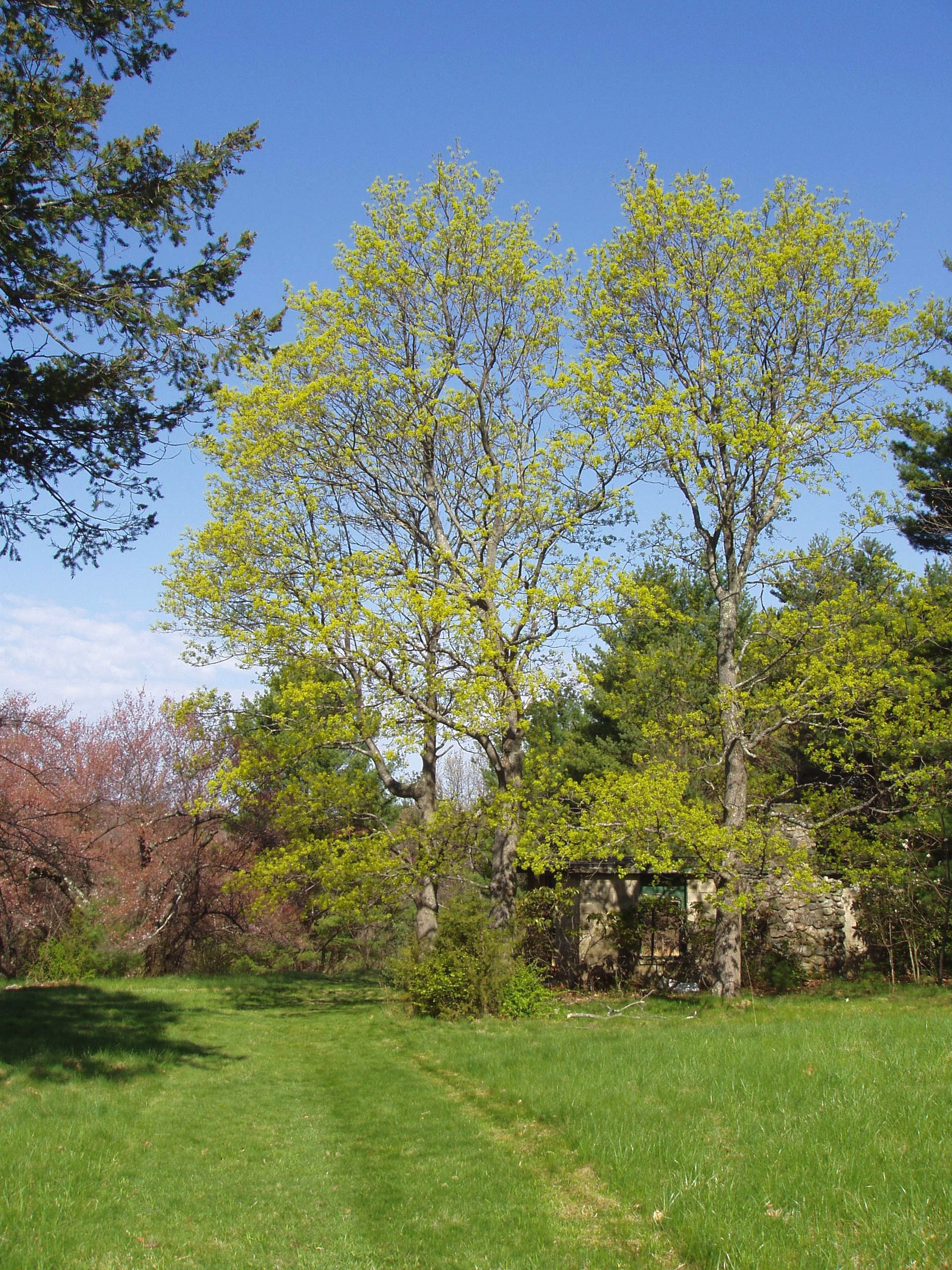
- General view of the Case Estates

- Location within Massachusetts Location within the United States
- Interactive map of Case Estates
- Type: Botanical Garden
- Location: Weston, Massachusetts
- Coordinates: 42.3580°N 71.2991°W
- Website: Official website

The Case Estates is a botanical garden located at 135 Wellesley Street, Weston, Massachusetts. Measuring 65 acres (260,000 m^{2}), the estates were at one time the active plant nurseries of the Arnold Arboretum.

The estates began in 1863 when James Case acquired its core property. From 1909 onwards his daughter, Miss Marian Roby Case, acquired adjoining property to establish Hillcrest Farms, which she operated from 1909 to 1942 as an experimental fruit and vegetable farm intended to "work up the scientific side of agriculture and provide summer employment and practical education for local youth." In 1942 she left the estate to Harvard University's Arnold Arboretum, which subsequently sold most of its houses. The Case family mansion is now used as Weston school offices.

Today the property is a semi-private reservation with lovely gardens and rare plant specimens. The majority of the site is an evergreen forest in semi-natural state, with pleasant walking trails. It also contains a fine rhododendron display garden maintained by the Massachusetts Chapter of the American Rhododendron Society.

One interesting feature of the property is its remarkable stone wall, which in 1911 was a birthday present from Miss Case to her sister Louisa. It is roughly 10 feet (3.0 m) high, up to 6 feet (1.8 m) thick, and 200 feet (61 m) long. It has been described as "the largest [or longest] free-standing dry wall in New England."

In 2006, Harvard University made the decision to sell the property, and on November 8, a Special Town Meeting of the Town of Weston voted to buy the estate for $22.5 million. Selectmen have said that the town may sell off as many as 10 parcels to recoup part of the cost.

The discovery of contaminants, dating back to 1900 when the land was used as an apple orchard, and disagreements over the remediation plan stalled the acquisition. In March 2015, the Arboretum and the Town of Weston announced that an agreement had been reached that allows for the sale of the Case Estates to the Town of Weston.

== Gallery ==
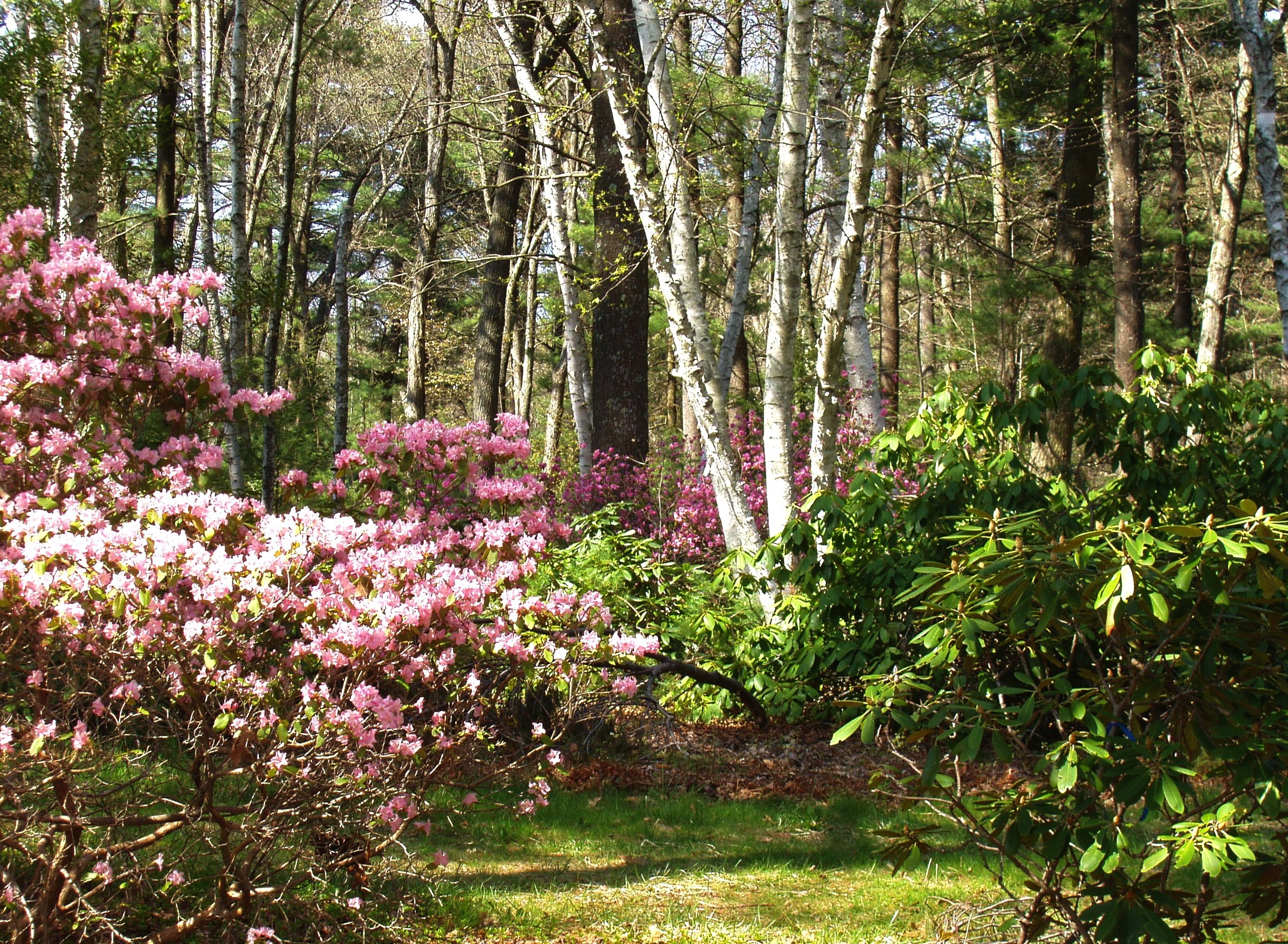
Rhododendron garden.

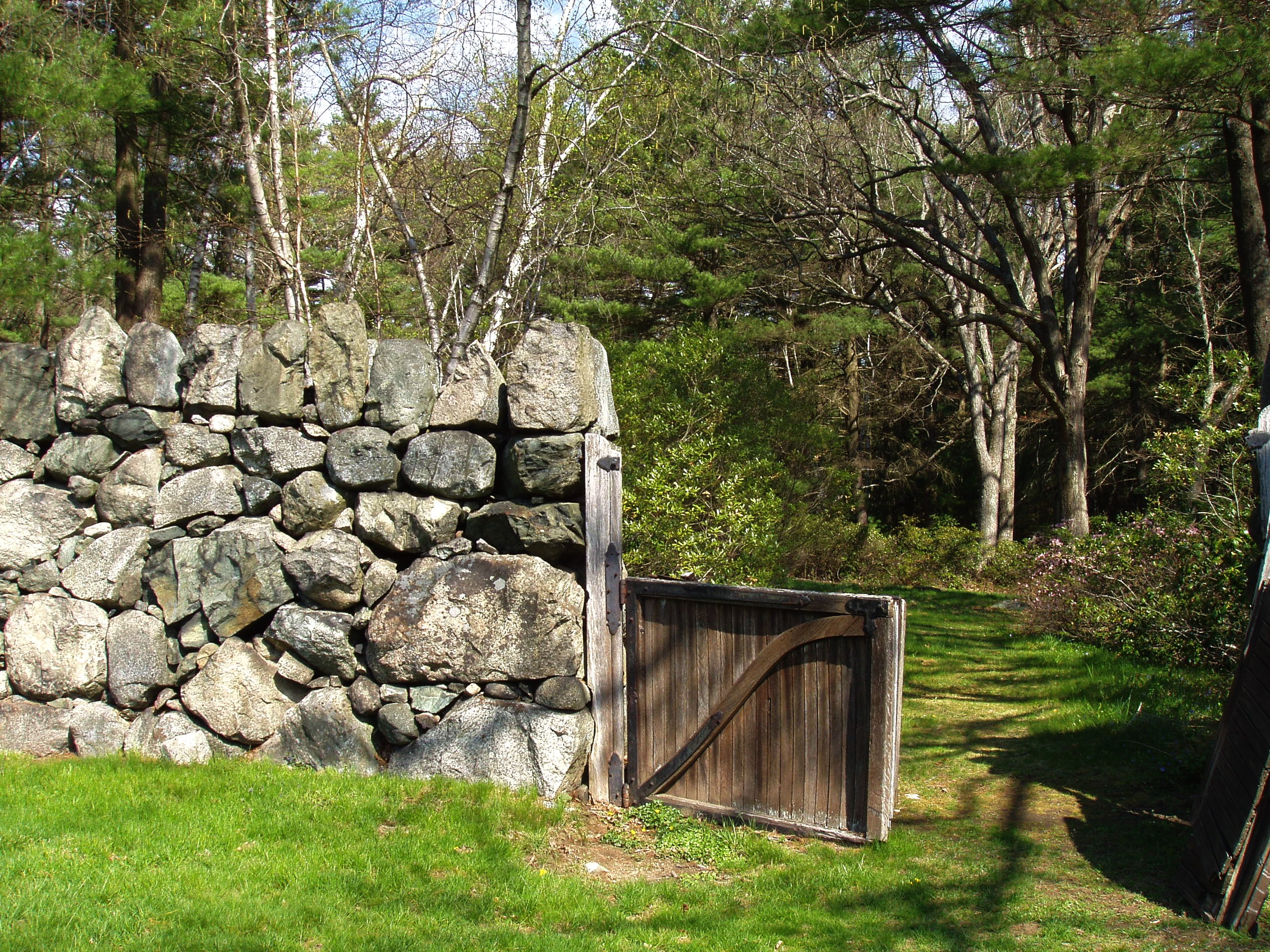
Stone wall with gate.

== See also ==
- List of botanical gardens in the United States
