= Boston Post Road Historic District (Darien, Connecticut) =

Historic district in Connecticut, United States

- U.S. National Register of Historic Places
- U.S. Historic district
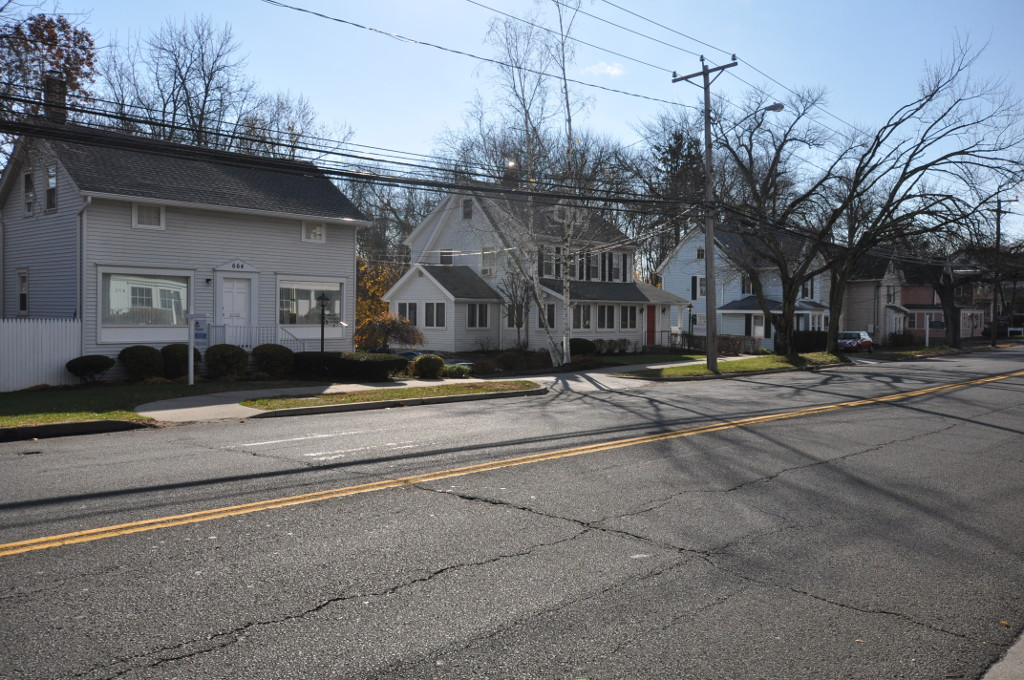

- Location within Connecticut Location within the United States
- Location: 567-728 Boston Post Road, 1-25 Brookside Road, and 45-70 Old Kings Highway North, Darien, Connecticut
- Coordinates: 41°4′51″N 73°27′58″W
- Area: 17 acres (6.9 ha)
- Architect: Multiple
- Architectural style: Mixed (more Than 2 Styles From Different Periods)
- NRHP reference No.: 82000997
- Added to NRHP: December 16, 1982

The Boston Post Road Historic District encompasses a cross-section of residential architectural styles representative of much of the history of Darien, Connecticut. Centered on the Junction of Boston Post Road (Route 1) and Brookdale Road, the district also includes two civic landmarks: the town hall and the Greek Revival First Congregational Church. The district was listed on the National Register of Historic Places in 1982.

== Description and history ==
Darien was settled by colonists as part of Stamford, and was first known as Middlesex Parish. A church parish separate from that of Stamford was established in 1737, and the town was incorporated in 1820. In 1740 a meeting house was built on the site where the present First Congregational Church now stands at Brookside Road and the Post Road. The current church, built to replace the meeting house, was built in 1837, and is a representative example of Greek Revival church architecture. Extending along the Post Road south to Darien Town Hall (Classical Revival, built 1910 as a school, converted to town hall in 1949) are a series of houses whose construction dates and architectural styles represent more than a century of the town's history, from 1800 to the 1920s. Set just east of the church on Brookdale Road and the Old King's Highway are some of the town's oldest houses, including the Bates-Scofield House built in 1736 and used as an office by the Darien Historical Society. That house is where the meeting organizing the church parish was held in 1739.

The district is about 17 acres (6.9 ha) in size, with 23 historically significant properties. None of the residential properties are particularly distinguished for their architecture, but are significant for their representation of the patterns of growth and development of the community.

== See also ==
- National Register of Historic Places listings in Fairfield County, Connecticut
