= Auburndale, Massachusetts =

Village of Newton, Massachusetts

- Village
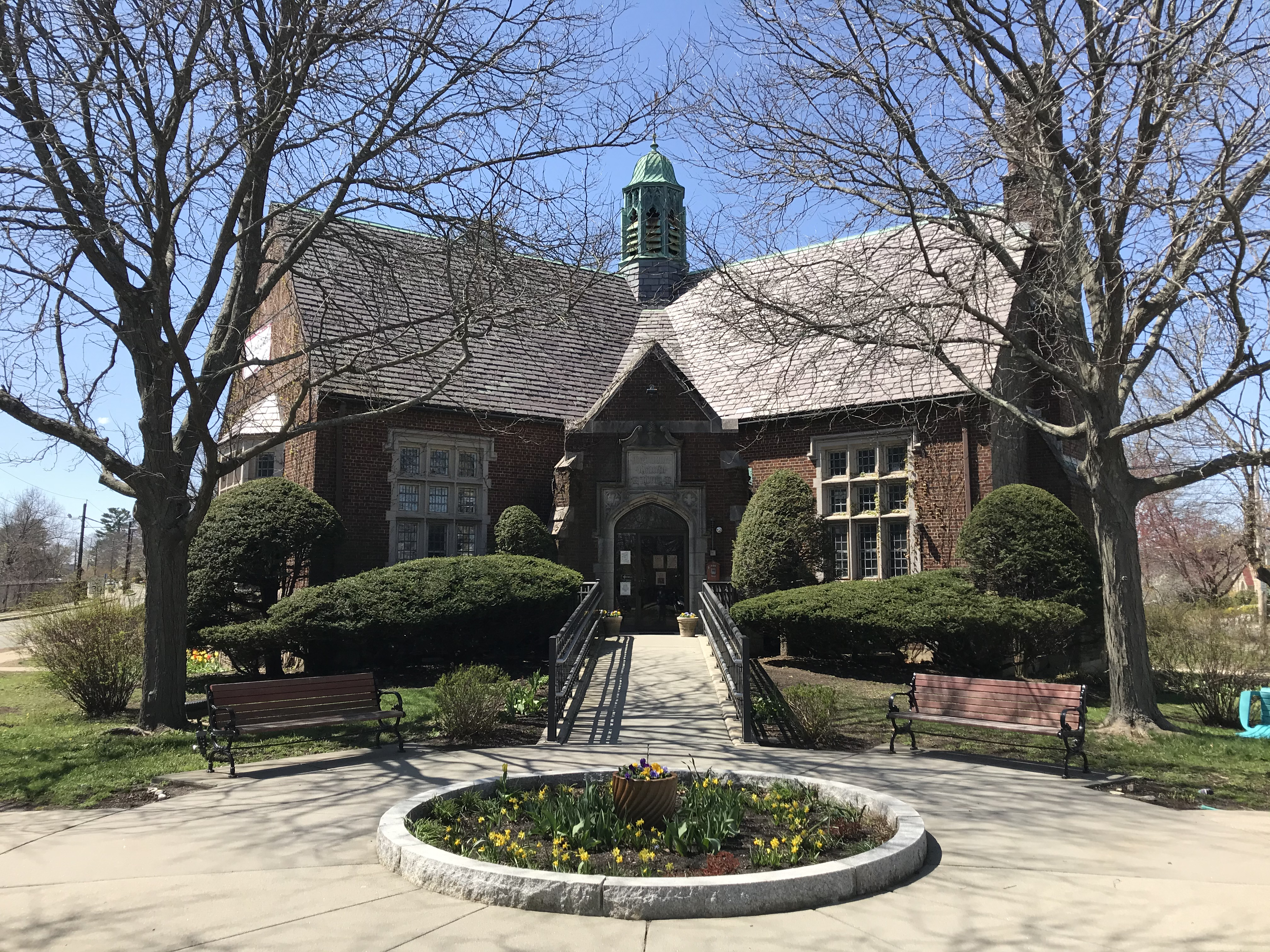
- Auburndale Library

- Location within Greater Boston area Location within Massachusetts Location within the United States
- Coordinates: 42°20′50″N 71°14′58″W
- Country: United States
- State: Massachusetts
- County: Middlesex
- City: Newton
- Time zone: UTC-5 (Eastern (EST))
  - Summer (DST): UTC-4 (EDT)
- ZIP code: 02466
- Area codes: 617 and 857

Auburndale is one of the 13 villages within the city of Newton in Middlesex County, Massachusetts, United States. It lies at the western end of Newton near the intersection of interstate highways 90 and 95. It is bisected by the Massachusetts Turnpike (Interstate 90). Auburndale is surrounded by three other Newton villages (West Newton, Waban, and Newton Lower Falls) as well as the city of Waltham and the Charles River. Auburndale is the home of Williams and Burr Elementary Schools, as well as Lasell University. Auburndale Square is the location of the Plummer Memorial Library, which is run by the Auburndale Community Library and no longer affiliated with the Newton Free Library, the Turtle Lane Playhouse, and many small businesses.

== History ==
The first major settler in the area was William Robinson, who built a house in 1678 on what is now Freeman Street. The oldest house in Auburndale at 473 Auburn Street was built in 1730 by William Robinson.

Auburndale, once billed as Auburndale-on-the-Charles, was the home of Norumbega Park, which closed in 1963. The park included rides, a zoo, and boating. The nationally famous big band venue Totem Pole Ballroom was associated with Norumbega Park and closed in 1964. The area now contains over 80 acres of conservation land, as well as access to the Charles River.

== Transportation ==
Auburndale is divided into two parts by the Massachusetts Turnpike, which connects it to neighboring villages of Newton and downtown Boston. The village is located adjacent to the intersection of Interstate 90 and I-95.

A number of public transportation options connect Auburndale to neighboring communities. The MBTA Green Line's D Branch light rail line serves Auburndale at Woodland and Riverside stations, the latter being the line's terminus. Both stations have bus connections; Woodland station is served by MWRTA bus routes 1 and 8, while Riverside connects to MBTA bus route 558.

The MBTA Commuter Rail's Framingham/Worcester Line serves the village at Auburndale station, adjacent to the Massachusetts Turnpike. MBTA bus routes 505 and 558, which offer express service to downtown Boston, both stop at the station.

== National Register historic sites ==
Nineteen places in Auburndale are on the National Register of Historic Places, as follows

| Image | Site Name | Street address | Built/Founded/Comments | Date designated |
|---|---|---|---|---|
| | Auburndale Congregational Church-United Parish of Auburndale | 64 Hancock St. | 1857 | October 4, 1986 |
| | Clark House | 379 Central St. | ? | October 4, 1986 |
| | E. C. Hammond House | 35 Groveland St. | ? | March 16, 1990 |
| | Harding House-Walker Missionary Home | 161–163 Grove St. | ? | October 4, 1986 |
| | House at 203 Islington Road | 203 Islington Rd. | ? | October 4, 1986 |
| | House at 102 Staniford Street | 102 Staniford St. | ? | October 4, 1986 |
| | House at 2212 Commonwealth Avenue | 2212 Commonwealth Ave. | ? | October 4, 1986 |
| | House at 230 Melrose Street | 230 Melrose St. | ? | October 4, 1986 |
| | House at 307 Lexington Street | 307 Lexington St. | ? | October 4, 1986 |
| | House at 31 Woodbine Street | 31 Woodbine St. | ? | October 4, 1986 |
| | Lasell Neighborhood Historic District | Roughly bounded by Woodland and Studio Rds., Aspen and Seminary Aves., and Grove St. Includes Lasell College. | ? | October 4, 1986 |
| | Old Shephard Farm | 1832 Washington St., on city rolls as 39 Stanton Avenue | ? | October 4, 1986 |
| | Plummer Memorial Library | 375 Auburn St. | ? | March 16, 1990 |
| | Riverside Concrete Company-Lamont's Market | 2 Charles St. | ? | March 16, 1990 |
| | Rufus Estabrook House | 33 Woodland Rd | ? | October 4, 1986 |
| | The Eminence | 122 Islington Rd. | ? | October 4, 1986 |
| | Walker Home for Missionary Children | 161–63, 165, 167 Grove St., 136, 138, 144 Hancock St. | ? | July 4, 1992 |
| | Whittemore's Tavern | 473 Auburn St. | ? | October 4, 1986 |
| | Winslow-Haskell Mansion | 53 Vista Ave. | ? | November 25, 1979 |

== Local Historic District ==
Established in 2005, the Auburndale Historic District includes approximately 275 properties and encompasses two National Register Districts.

== Places of worship ==
- Corpus Christi and St. Bernard's Parish, 41 Ash Street.
- Episcopal Parish of the Messiah, 1900 Commonwealth Avenue.
- Temple Reyim, 1860 Washington Street.
- United Parish of Auburndale, 64 Hancock Street.

== Points of interest ==
- Auburndale Cove Park & Playground
- Norumbega Park Conservation Area
- Woodland Golf Club
- Charles River Canoe & Kayak

== See also ==
- List of Registered Historic Places in Newton, Massachusetts
