= Adams Claflin House =

Historic house in Massachusetts, United States

- U.S. National Register of Historic Places
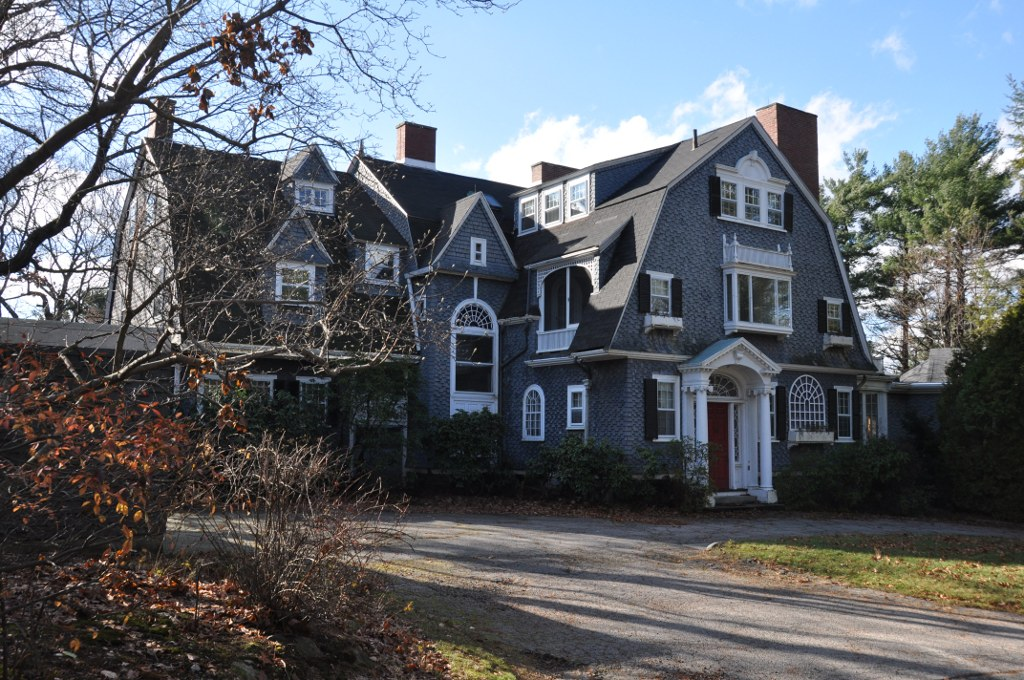

- Location within Massachusetts Location within the United States
- Location: 156 Grant Ave., Newton, Massachusetts
- Coordinates: 42°20′3″N 71°11′16″W
- Built: 1890
- Architect: Brown, Samuel
- Architectural style: Colonial Revival, Shingle Style
- MPS: Newton MRA
- NRHP reference No.: 86001783
- Added to NRHP: September 04, 1986

The Adams Claflin House is a historic house at 156 Grant Avenue in the village of Newton Centre in Newton, Massachusetts. It is a large 2 1/2-story cross-gable wood-frame structure, built in the Shingle style to a design by Samuel Brown for Adams Davenport Claflin. Claflin was the son of Massachusetts Governor and Newtonville resident William Claflin, and was a major landowner in Newtonville as well as president of the Boston and Suburban Electric Company. Claflin was a major developer of the streetcar system that served Newton. Architecturally, the house shows vestiges of the Queen Anne style, with its asymmetrical massing and wealth of projections and gables, as well as elements of the Colonial Revival, exemplified by a Palladian window, and by the pedimented front porch. The house is one of several designed by Brown for the Claflin family.

Adams Claflin was the president of Norumbega Park in Auburndale starting from when it opened in 1897.

On September 4, 1986, the house was added to the National Register of Historic Places.

== See also ==
- National Register of Historic Places listings in Newton, Massachusetts
