= Amos Russel Wells =

- Born: December 23, 1862; Glens Falls, New York, US
- Died: March 6, 1933 (aged 70); Auburndale, Massachusetts, US
- Education: Antioch College
- Occupations: Editor, writer, professor

Amos Russel Wells (December 23, 1862 – March 6, 1933) was an American editor, author and professor.

== Biography ==
Amos Russel Wells was born in Glens Falls, New York on December 23, 1862.

He graduated from Antioch College in 1883. He was professor of Greek and geology at Antioch College from 1883 to 1891 and from 1891 editor of the Christian Endeavor World, Boston. From 1901, he was associate author of Peloubet's Notes on the Sunday School Lessons. He was a member of the International Sunday-School Lesson Committee. He was a voluminous author, no less than 63 titles being credited to his pen. His works include books dealing with young people's work, the Sunday school, juvenile fiction, poetry and devotional literature.

He died at his home in Auburndale, Massachusetts on March 6, 1933.

== Selected works ==
- Golden Rule Meditations (1893)
- Business: A Plain Talk With Men and Women Who Work (1894)
- Social to Save (1895)
- The Missionary Manual (1899)
- The Caxton Club (1902)
- Witchery Ways (1904)
- Sunday-School Problems (1905)
- Caleb Cobweb's Comparisons (1908)
- The Living Bible (1908)
- Why We Believe the Bible (1910)
- The Arithmetic of Friendship (1913)
- Union Work (1916)
