= Newton Centre Branch Library =

- U.S. National Register of Historic Places
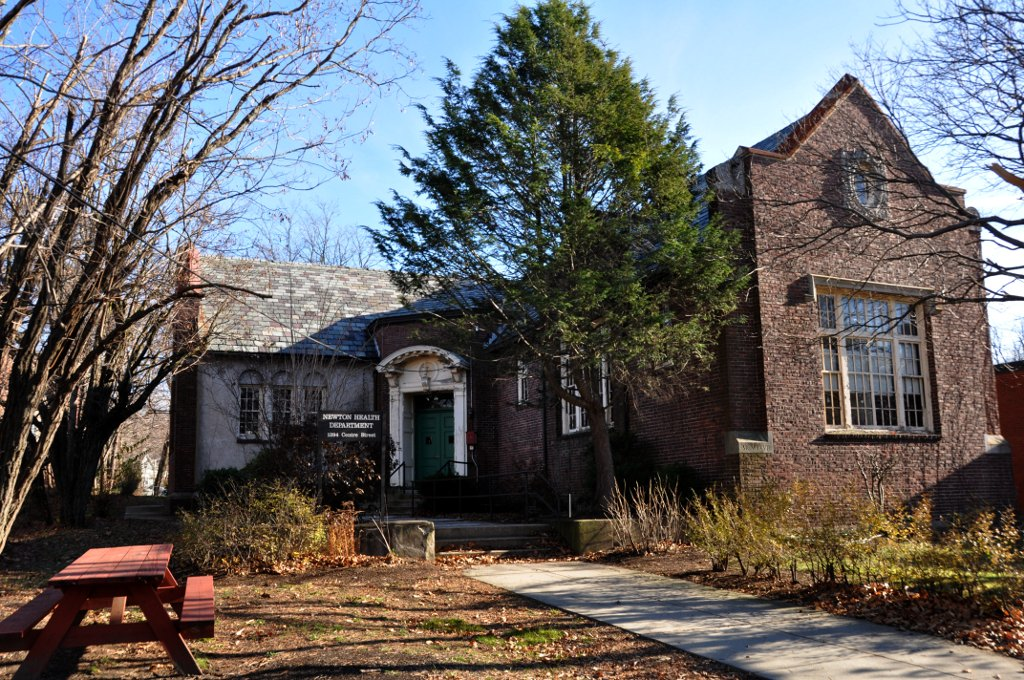

- Location within Massachusetts Location within the United States
- Location: 1294 Centre St., Newton, Massachusetts
- Coordinates: 42°19′45″N 71°11′43″W
- Built: 1927
- Architect: Ritchie, Parsons & Taylor
- Architectural style: Tudor Revival
- MPS: Newton MRA
- NRHP reference No.: 90000024
- Added to NRHP: February 16, 1990

The Newton Centre Branch Library is a historic library building at 1294 Centre Street in Newton, Massachusetts. The building now houses municipal offices. (A new library building opened near city hall in 1991.) The 1 1/2-story brick building was designed by Newton resident James Ritchie of Ritchie, Parsons & Tyler, and was built in 1928. It was one of five branch libraries paid for by subscription of Newton citizens and built between 1926 and 1939. The building is basically Tudor Revival in its styling, although its entry has a Colonial Revival segmented arch surround.

The building was listed on the National Register of Historic Places in 1990.

== See also ==
- Waban Branch Library
- Plummer Memorial Library in Auburndale
- National Register of Historic Places listings in Newton, Massachusetts
