= United Parish of Auburndale =

Historic church in Massachusetts, United States

- Auburndale Congregational Church- United Parish of Auburndale
- U.S. National Register of Historic Places
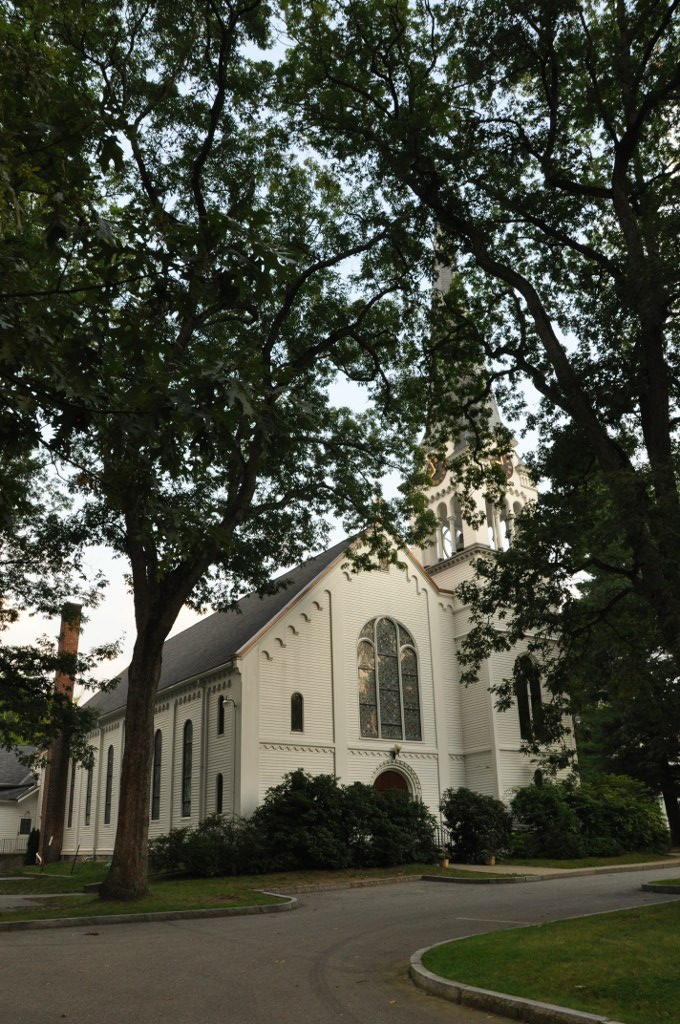

- Location within the United States Location within Massachusetts
- Location: 64 Hancock Street, Auburndale, Newton, Massachusetts
- Coordinates: 42°20′38.75″N 71°14′59.78″W
- Built: 1857
- NRHP reference No.: 86001769
- Added to NRHP: September 4, 1986

United Parish of Auburndale, formerly the Auburndale Congregational Church, is a historic church at 64 Hancock Street in the Auburndale village of Newton, Massachusetts. Built in 1857 for an 1850 congregation and repeatedly enlarged, it is a prominent regional example of Romanesque architecture in wood. It was added to the National Register of Historic Places on September 4, 1986.

== History ==
The Auburndale Congregational Church was organized in 1850, and the main part of the church building was completed in 1857 to a design by Charles Edward Parker, an architect who lived nearby. Its spire was blown down and rebuilt in 1862, and the nave was sympathetically extended in Auburndale Congregational Church has become a federated congregation known as United Parish of Auburndale and affiliated in 1878, the same year its chapel was added. The porch on the south side was added in 1880, and the chapel was enlarged in 1892. A single-story office wing was added in 1950.

The organ is an 1870 E.&G.G. Hook restored and enlarged by George Bozeman Jr. in 1972.

The present congregation was formed in 1980 when the original congregation formed a federated union with the Centenary United Methodist Church. It now maintains affiliation with both the United Church of Christ and the United Methodist Church.

== Architecture ==
The church is located in the southern part of the village of Auburndale, in a residential area near Lasell Junior College. It is set on the eastern corner of Hancock Street and Woodland Road, and is oriented with its front facing Hancock Street. It is a long single-story wood-frame structure, with a gable roof and clapboarded exterior. A three-stage square tower rises from the front right corner, its levels defined by round-arch Romanesque windows and belfry openings, with a slate-roof steeple at the top. The main entrance is set at the center of the Hancock Street facade, beneath a large stained-glass round-arch window. Window bays are articulated by pilasters, and most windows have round-arch tops. The eaves and gable ends are adorned with drip moulding. The porch on the south side has elaborate later Victorian decorative elements.

== Activities ==
Other than hosting weekly congregations and other religious services, the church is involved in several fundraisers and community service actions. In the past it has hosted weekly alcoholics anonymous meetings. It also holds an annual pumpkin patch fundraiser in October. There is a church auction held every two years, the most recent of which was held in April of 2024 and the next is set to happen in early 2026.

== See also ==
- National Register of Historic Places listings in Newton, Massachusetts

gius
