= Waban Library Center =

- U.S. National Register of Historic Places
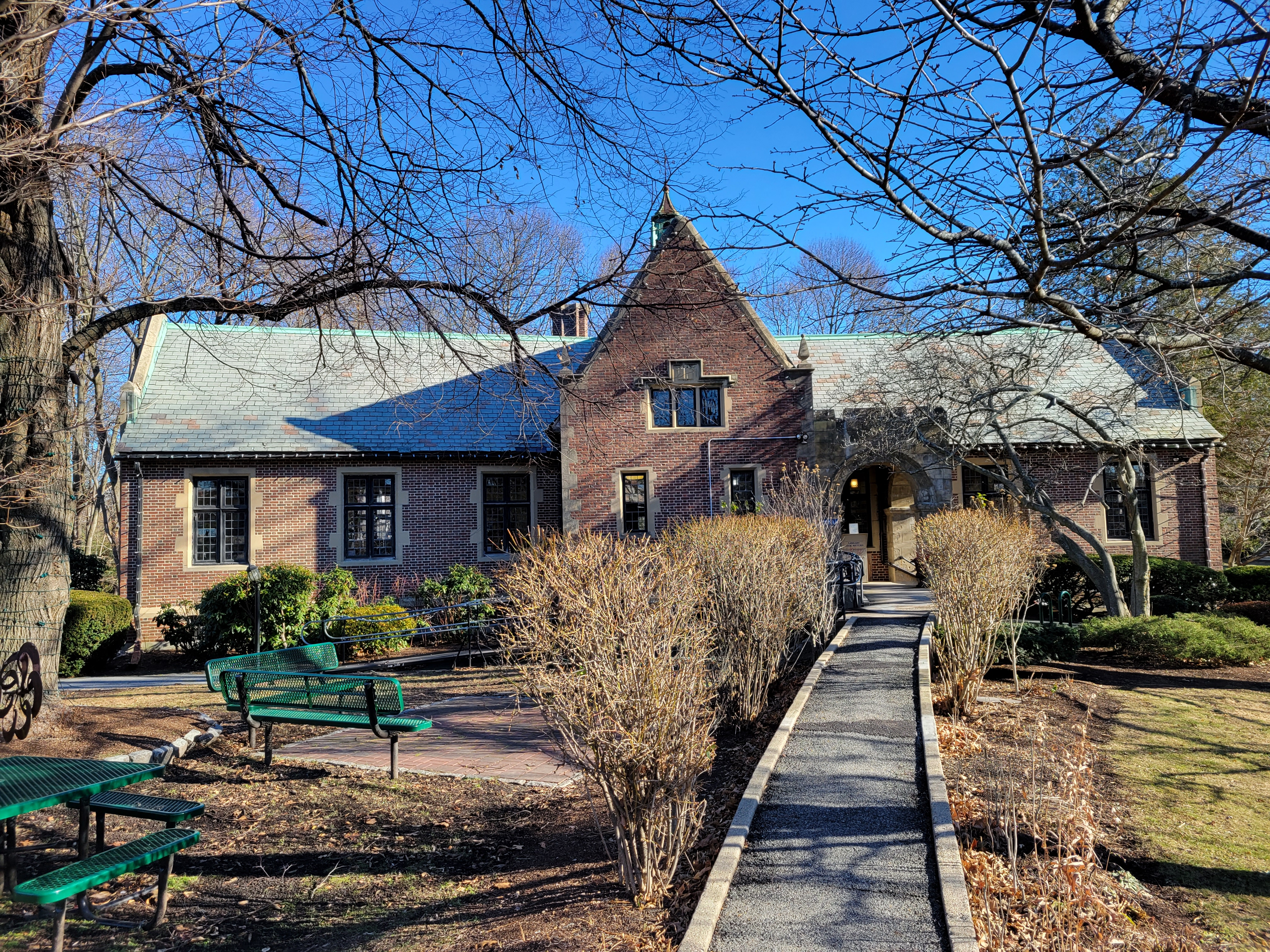
- Waban Library Center

- Location within Massachusetts Location within the United States
- Location: 1608 Beacon St., Newton, Massachusetts
- Coordinates: 42°19′37.5″N 71°13′46.0″W
- Built: 1929
- Architect: Densmore, LeClear & Robbins
- Architectural style: Tudor Revival
- MPS: Newton MRA
- NRHP reference No.: 90000037
- Added to NRHP: February 16, 1990

The Waban Library Center is a library located in a historic building at 1608 Beacon Street in Newton, Massachusetts. The building is a modest 1½ story Tudor Revival brick building, with a gabled slate roof and raised end walls. A cross-gabled entry area projects from the center of the front facade. It was designed by Densmore, LeClear & Robbins and built in 1929 with funds raised by the citizens of Waban, Newton. The building was listed on the National Register of Historic Places in 1990.

The Waban Library Center is a volunteer-run community library located in the Waban village of Newton, Massachusetts. Originally established in 1930 as one of 16 village libraries within Newton. Following the opening of the Newton Free Library in 1991, the city began systematically closing the village libraries, ultimately leaving only four in operation by 2000.

In 2007, facing municipal budget constraints, the City of Newton announced plans to close the remaining village libraries and convert their buildings into city offices. In response, the Waban Improvement Society petitioned the city to take over management of the Waban branch. This effort led to a lease agreement with the city, allowing the society to reopen the facility independently.

The Waban Library Center officially reopened in September 2009, fully staffed by volunteers and funded through the non-profit Waban Improvement Society. Though independent from the Newton Free Library, it continues the tradition of serving as a village reading room and now functions as a vibrant community hub. The center offers a variety of programs and resources designed to foster lifelong learning and promote intellectual, cultural, social, and physical enrichment for residents of all ages.

== See also ==
- Plummer Memorial Library
- Newton Centre Branch Library
- National Register of Historic Places listings in Newton, Massachusetts
