= Marion Nichols Summer Home =

Historic house in New Hampshire, United States

- U.S. National Register of Historic Places
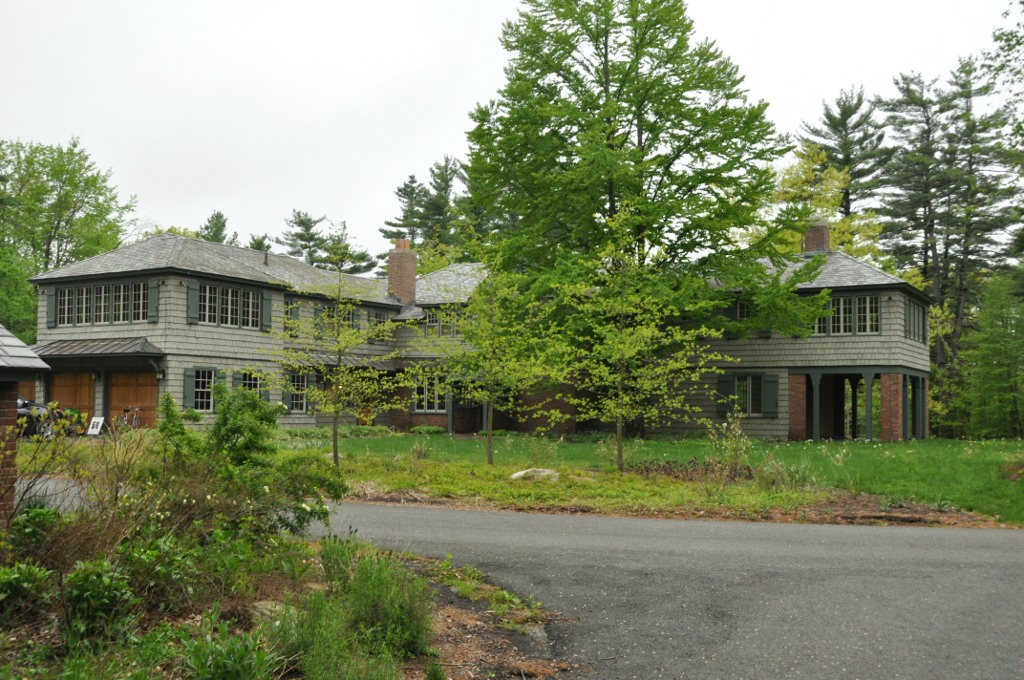

- Location within New Hampshire Location within the United States
- Location: 56 Love Lane, Hollis, New Hampshire
- Coordinates: 42°44′4″N 71°36′2″W
- Area: 4.9 acres (2.0 ha)
- Built: 1935
- Built by: Osgood Construction Company
- Architect: Densmore, LeClear & Robbins
- Architectural style: Late 19th and 20th Century Revivals
- NRHP reference No.: 03001283
- Added to NRHP: December 10, 2003

The Marion Nichols Summer House is a historic house at 56 Love Lane in Hollis, New Hampshire, adjacent to the grounds of the Beaver Brook Association's conservation land. Built in 1935 for a wealthy widow, it is a locally rare example of a house built expressly as a summer residence. The house was listed on the National Register of Historic Places in 2003. It is now monitored for historical compliance by the Beaver Brook Association.

== Description and history ==
The Marion Nichols Summer House is located in a rural setting behind the Hollis school complex on the west side of New Hampshire Route 122 south of the village center. The main house is an L-shaped two-story wood-frame structure. It is stylistically eclectic, with Tudor Revival features (including diamond-paned windows), Craftsman elements, and Colonial Revival elements. The interior is finished in a somewhat rustic style, with vertical pine siding in the living room, and possibly recycled timbers in the ceiling. The property also includes a c. 1940 single-story structure which originally housed a workshop and a billiard room, and a small brick wellhouse built about the same time as the house.

The house was designed by Densmore, LeClear & Robbins, a noted firm of architects and engineers from Boston. Turner Hodgdon of that firm was the associate in charge of the project. The builder of the house was the Osgood Construction Company of Nashua.

The house was built in 1935 for Marion Poole Nichols, a wealthy widow whose family had been summering in Hollis for some years, typically staying at the family homestead on Main Street. With growing families, that space had become cramped, and the family purchased the Buttonwood farm, where they built this house as a retreat for the aging matriarch. Marion Nichols did not use the house very much, and formally conveyed it to her children in 1949. The family established the Beaver Brook Association in 1964 to preserve the rural landscape of the area, with this house property as one of its seeds. Beaver Brook Association sold the house in 2005 but still manages the easements and covenants that preserve the historical nature of the house and property. The Beaver Brook Association also manages more than 4,000 acres (1,600 ha) of land, and uses its land and facilities for conservation, education, hiking, corporate and social events.

== See also ==
- National Register of Historic Places listings in Hillsborough County, New Hampshire
