= Whittemore's Tavern =

Historic tavern in Massachusetts, United States

- U.S. National Register of Historic Places
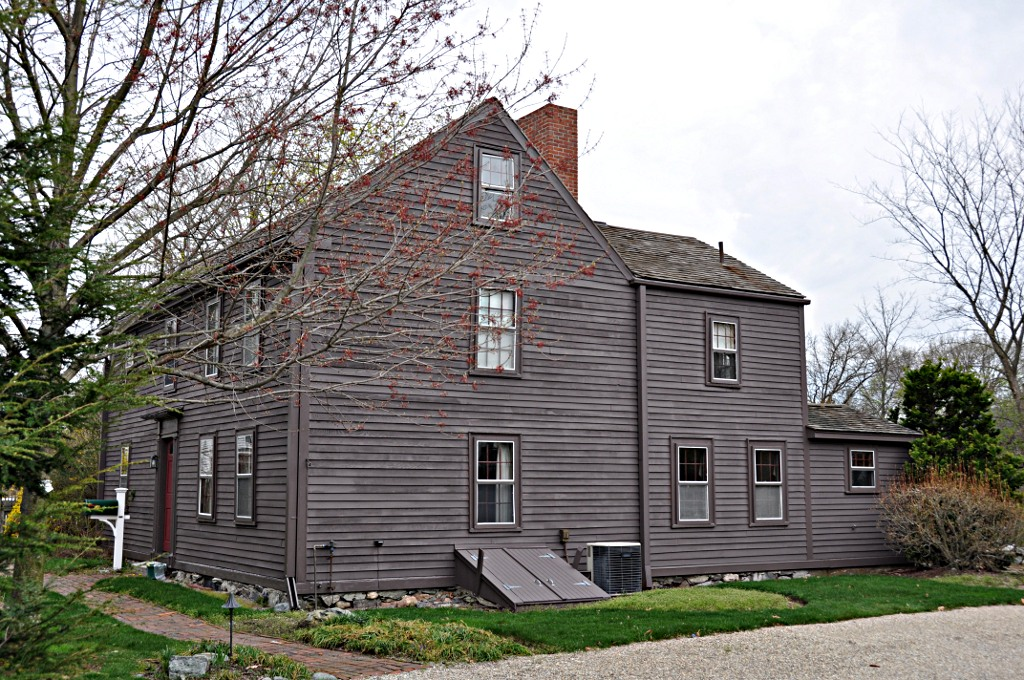

- Location within Massachusetts Location within the United States
- Location: 473 Auburn St., Newton, Massachusetts
- Coordinates: 42°20′43″N 71°15′12″W
- Built: 1724
- Architectural style: Georgian, Vernacular Georgian
- MPS: Newton MRA
- NRHP reference No.: 86001896
- Added to NRHP: September 04, 1986

Whittemore's Tavern is a historic building at 473 Auburn Street in the Auburndale village of Newton, Massachusetts. It was operated as a tavern for a time in the 18th century, but it is now a private residence. The 2 1/2-story wood-frame house was built c. 1724, probably by William Robinson II, sone of one of Auburndale's early settlers. It served as a tavern in the 1760s, when Auburn Street was a major east–west thoroughfare. The asymmetrical window placement on the front facade suggests that the house may have been built in stages.

The building was listed on the National Register of Historic Places in 1986.

== See also ==
- National Register of Historic Places listings in Newton, Massachusetts
