= Densmore and LeClear =

Architecture firm in Boston, Massachusetts

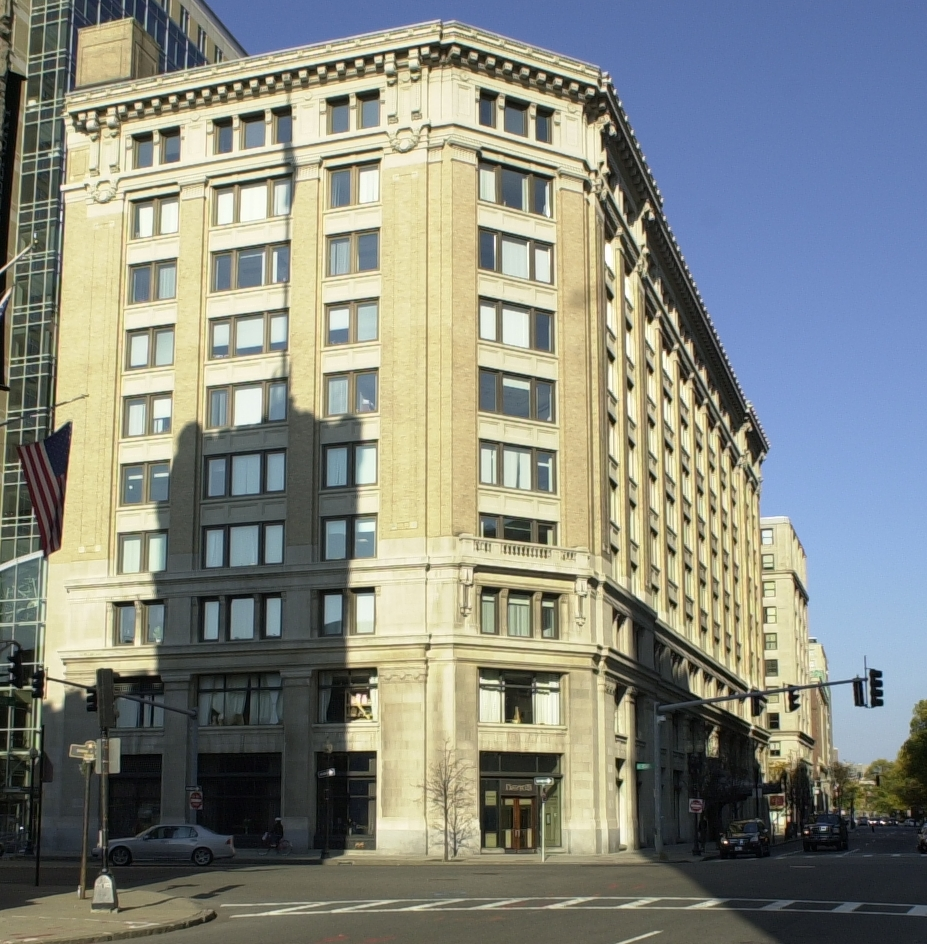
Paine Furniture Building, Boston, 1914

Densmore and LeClear was an architecture and engineering firm based in Boston, active from 1897 through 1941.

== Firm history ==
The founding principals were Edward D. Densmore (1871–1926) and Gifford LeClear (1874–1931). The partnership of Densmore & LeClear was formed in April 1897, practicing as mechanical and electrical engineers. One of the firm's major projects in this role was the design of the building systems for the new campus of the Harvard Medical School in Boston, in collaboration with architects Shepley, Rutan & Coolidge. They began providing structural engineering services as well, and with the hiring of architect Henry C. Robbins in 1907 were capable of handling all areas of building design. Robbins became a member of the partnership in 1914, though his name was not added to the firm's until the early 1920s, when it became Densmore, LeClear & Robbins. The firm continued to operate after the deaths of Densmore in 1926 and LeClear in 1931. Robbins continued as sole principal until his own death in 1941.

== Partner biographies ==
Edward Dana Densmore was born September 1, 1871, in Somerville, Massachusetts, to Charles Dana and Ellen Josephine (Brennan) Densmore. He attended the Somerville public schools before entering the Massachusetts Institute of Technology, graduating in 1893, followed by further study at the Lawrence Scientific School of Harvard University, from which he graduated in 1894. He worked for the General Electric Company and for Siemens & Halske of America before joining the office of consulting engineer Hollis French in Boston in January 1896. He remained with French until forming his partnership with LeClear in 1897.

Densmore married in 1905, to Annie Louise Walley of Boston. They had three children. The Densmore family lived at 26 Downing Road in Brookline. Densmore died December 25, 1926, at the age of 55.

Gifford LeClear was born January 3, 1874, in Rutherford, New Jersey, to Thomas and Cornelia (King) LeClear. He was educated in the private school of George Washington Copp Noble in Boston before entering Harvard University. He graduated with a Bachelor of Arts degree in 1895 and Master of Arts in 1896. He then worked for a year in the engineering department of the West End Street Railway before forming his partnership with Densmore in 1897.

LeClear married in 1903, to Helen Frances Parker of Boston. They had two children. The LeClear family lived at 86 Upland Road in the Waban neighborhood of Newton, Massachusetts, in a house built in 1916. LeClear died September 24, 1931, at the age of 57.

Henry Chandler Robbins was born September 12, 1876, in Westbrook, Maine, to Frederic E. C. and Elizabeth A. (Rogers) Robbins. He attended Deering High School before joining the office of Francis H. Fassett of Portland in 1895. In 1897 the entered the architectural school of Harvard University as part of the class of 1901, but left after completing his freshman year. He then worked for noted architect Herbert Langford Warren for seven years, plus two years as an architect for the American Telephone and Telegraph Company before joining Densmore & LeClear in 1907. He became a partner in 1914.

Robbins married in 1902, to Ida Leora Leighton of Portland, Maine. They had at least three children. The Robbins family home was at 89 Dorset Road in the Waban neighborhood of Newton, Massachusetts, a house built about 1916. Robbins died May 6, 1941, at the age of 64.

== Legacy ==
At least three buildings designed by Densmore & LeClear or Densmore, LeClear & Robbins have been listed on the United States National Register of Historic Places, and others contribute to listed historic districts.

== Architectural works ==
- Paine Furniture Building, 75–81 Arlington Street, Boston, Massachusetts, 1914
- Vose & Sons Piano Company Building, Wooley Avenue, Watertown, Massachusetts, 1922, later converted to Watertown Arsenal Building #39
- Egleston Theatre, 3091 Washington Street, Jamaica Plain, Massachusetts, 1926 (razed 2003)
- Salada Tea Company Building, 330 Stuart Street, Boston, 1927
- Waban Branch Library, 1608 Beacon Street, Newton, Massachusetts, 1929
- New England Telephone and Telegraph, 6 Bowdoin Square, Boston, 1930
- Metropolitan District Commission Headquarters, 20 Somerset Street, Boston, 1930
- Bangor Telephone Exchange Building, Bangor, Maine, 1931
- House for Marion Nichols, Hollis, New Hampshire, 1935
- First Church of Christ, Scientist, Newton, Massachusetts, 1940
