= Paine Furniture Building =

Historic place in Massachusetts, United States

- U.S. National Register of Historic Places
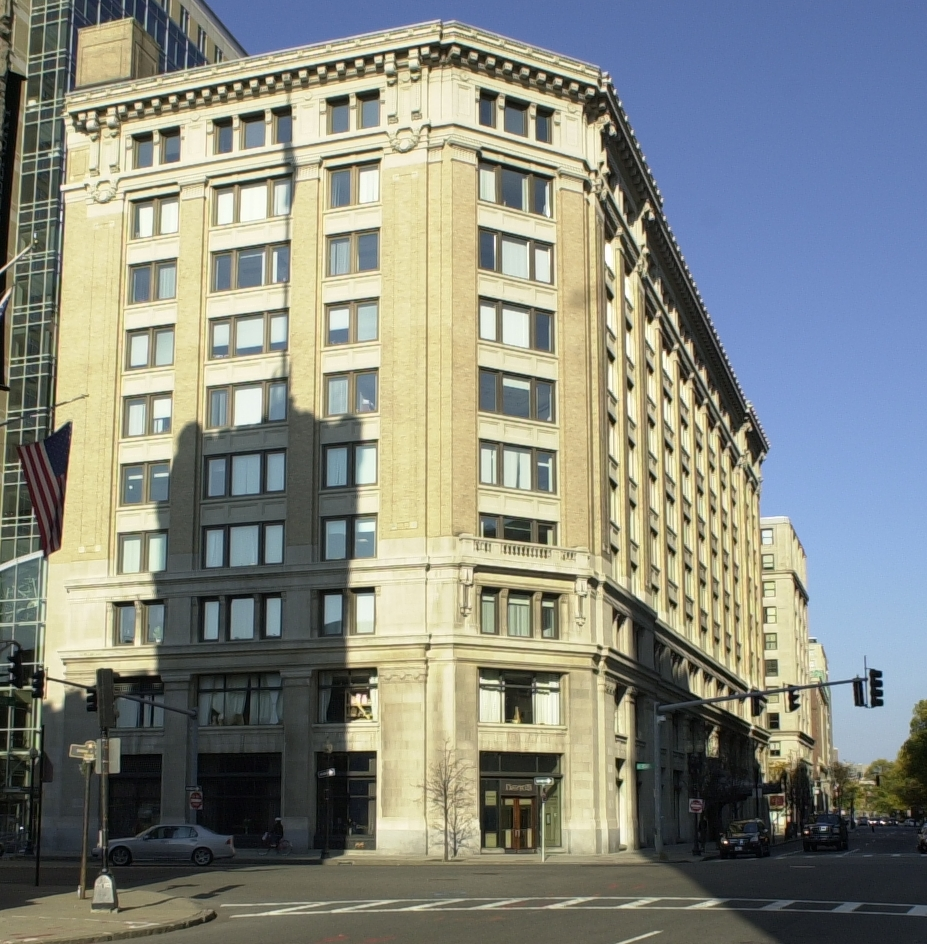

- Location within Boston Location within Massachusetts Location within the United States
- Location: 75-81 Arlington St., Boston, Massachusetts
- Coordinates: 42°21′1.98″N 71°4′13.02″W
- Area: less than one acre
- Built: 1914
- Architect: Densmore and LeClear
- Architectural style: Classical Revival
- NRHP reference No.: 02001039
- Added to NRHP: September 12, 2002

The Paine Furniture Building is an historic commercial building at 75-81 Arlington Street in Boston, Massachusetts. It occupies the entire block between St. James and Stuart Streets, and has a prominent position on Park Square.

The ten-story building was constructed in 1914 in a Classical Revival style, to a design by Densmore and LeClear. It was designed to house the showrooms, offices, and manufacturing facilities of the Paine Furniture Company, at one time the largest furniture company in New England. The company sold the building in 1989. It has steel frame construction, and is faced in limestone.

The building was added to the National Register of Historic Places in 2002. It is currently a pending Boston Landmark. Suffolk University's New England School of Art and Design currently occupies part of the building.

== See also ==
- National Register of Historic Places listings in northern Boston, Massachusetts
