= Rufus Estabrook House =

Historic house in Massachusetts, United States

- U.S. National Register of Historic Places
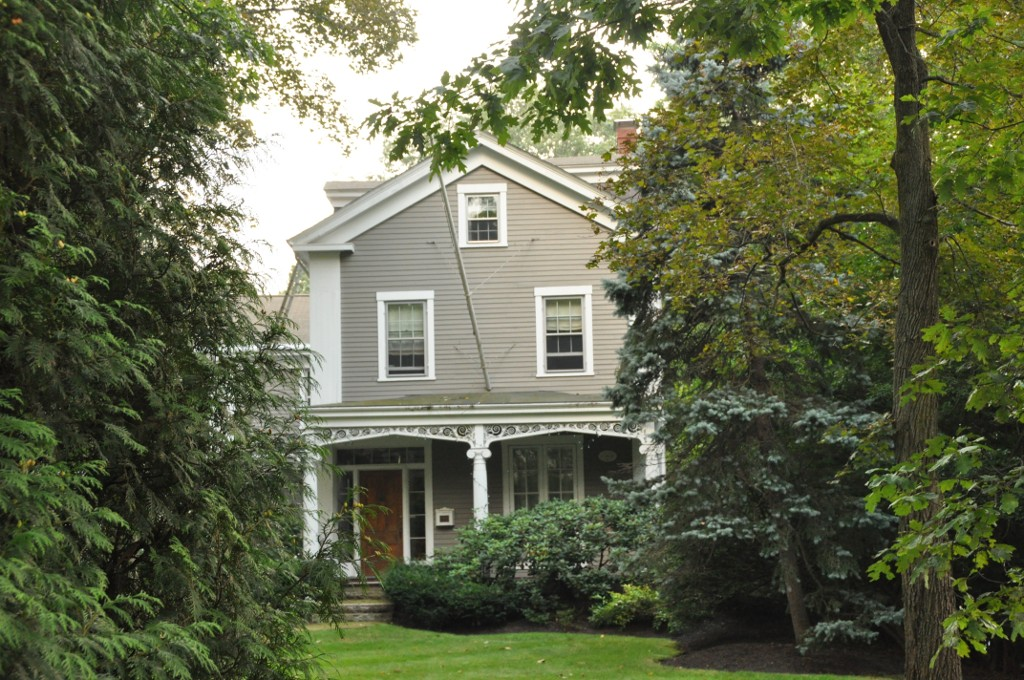

- Location within Massachusetts
- Location: 33 Woodland Rd., Newton, Massachusetts
- Coordinates: 42°20′39″N 71°15′9″W
- Built: 1848
- Architectural style: Greek Revival
- MPS: Newton MRA
- NRHP reference No.: 86001795
- Added to NRHP: September 04, 1986

The Rufus Estabrook House is a historic house at 33 Woodland Road in Newton, Massachusetts.

== Description and history ==
It is a 2 1/2-story wood-frame structure, two bays in width, with a front-facing gable roof and a porch extending across the front supported by Ionic columns. The entrance is flanked by sidelight windows and wide pilasters. The house was built c. 1848, and is one of the earliest houses built when Auburndale was subdivided for development. It is a well preserved Greek Revival side-hall plan house.

The house was listed on the National Register of Historic Places on September 4, 1986.

== See also ==
- National Register of Historic Places listings in Newton, Massachusetts
