= House at 2212 Commonwealth Avenue =

Historic house in Massachusetts, United States

- U.S. National Register of Historic Places
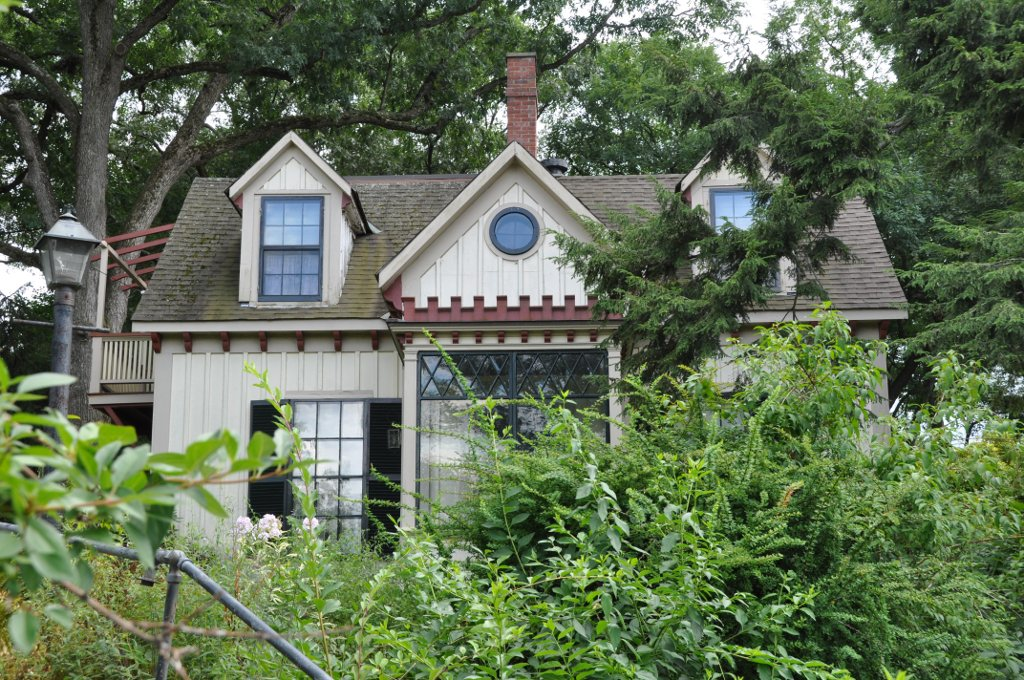

- Location within Massachusetts Location within the United States
- Location: 2212 Commonwealth Ave., Newton, Massachusetts
- Coordinates: 42°20′48″N 71°15′11″W
- Built: 1845
- Architectural style: Gothic Revival
- MPS: Newton MRA
- NRHP reference No.: 86001823
- Added to NRHP: September 04, 1986

The House at 2212 Commonwealth Avenue, in the Auburndale section of Newton, Massachusetts, is a rare local example of domestic Gothic Revival architecture. The two story wood-frame house was built c. 1845, and is distinguished by its board-and-batten siding, oriel window, crenellated porch decoration, and bracketing in the eaves. It appears to be based on one of the panel's in Andrew Jackson Downing's The Architecture of Country Houses, which espoused the style.

The house was listed on the National Register of Historic Places in 1986.

== See also ==
- National Register of Historic Places listings in Newton, Massachusetts
