= House at 102 Staniford Street =

Historic house in Massachusetts, United States

- U.S. National Register of Historic Places
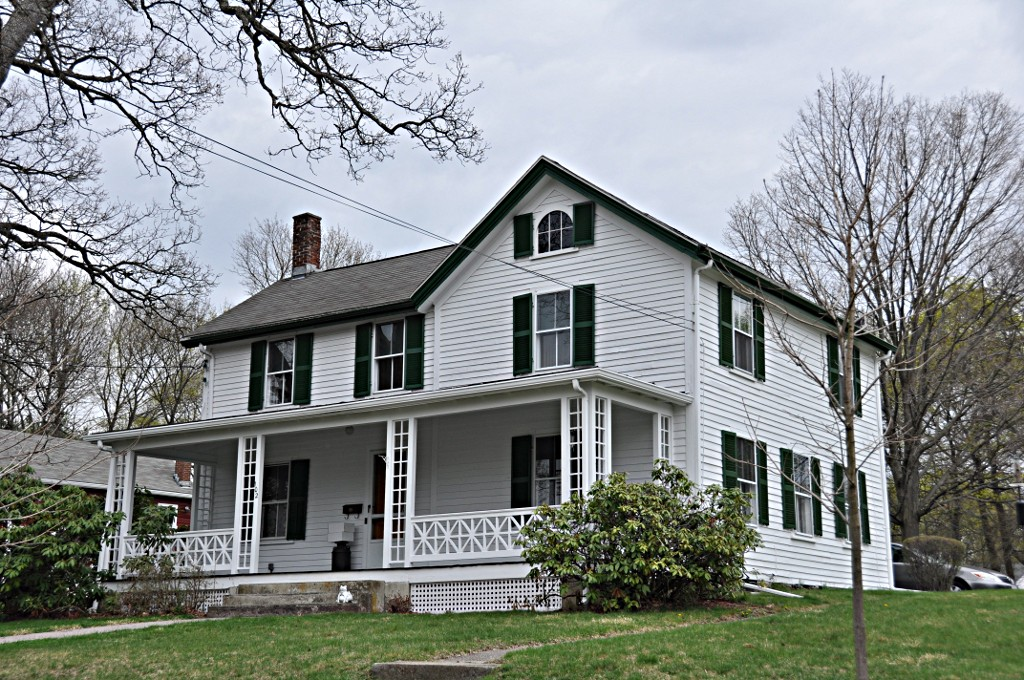

- Location within Massachusetts Location within the United States
- Location: 102 Staniford St., Newton, Massachusetts
- Coordinates: 42°21′11″N 71°14′55″W
- Area: 1.27 acres (0.51 ha)
- Built: 1869
- Architectural style: Italianate, Vernacular Italianate
- MPS: Newton MRA
- NRHP reference No.: 86001814
- Added to NRHP: September 04, 1986

102 Staniford Street in the Auburndale section of Newton, Massachusetts, is a rare surviving element of Auburndale's agricultural past, including both a 19th-century house and barn. Built about 1869 and enlarged in 1915, it exhibits vernacular Italianate styling. It was listed on the National Register of Historic Places in 1986. As of 2026, it was still within the family of its original owner.

== Description and history ==
102 Staniford Street stands in a residential area north of the village center of Auburndale, on the east side of Staniford Street north of West Pine Street. It stands on over 1 acre (0.40 ha) of land, along with a 19th-century barn. The house is a 2 1/2-story wood-frame structure, that is basically T-shaped with a cross-gabled roof. The original main block is oriented facing south, but subsequent modifications have relocated the main entrance to the west side of the north-facing T leg. A single-story porch extends across the western facade, decorated with latticework balustrade and posts. A nod is made to Italianate styling with a round-arch window in the west-facing gable.

The house was built about 1869 for Patrick Carey, an Irish immigrant who came to the United States in 1859, settling in Newton by 1865. Originally working as a laborer, Carey developed the property as a dairy farm. One of his descendants converted the property to poultry farming in the 1930s, a role continued until the 1950s. The barn is of 19th-century construction, but has undergone numerous modifications, first for conversion to support the raising of poultry, and then as a residence. It is one of the few surviving agricultural buildings in the city.

== See also ==
- National Register of Historic Places listings in Newton, Massachusetts
