= House at 31 Woodbine Street =

Historic house in Massachusetts, United States

- U.S. National Register of Historic Places
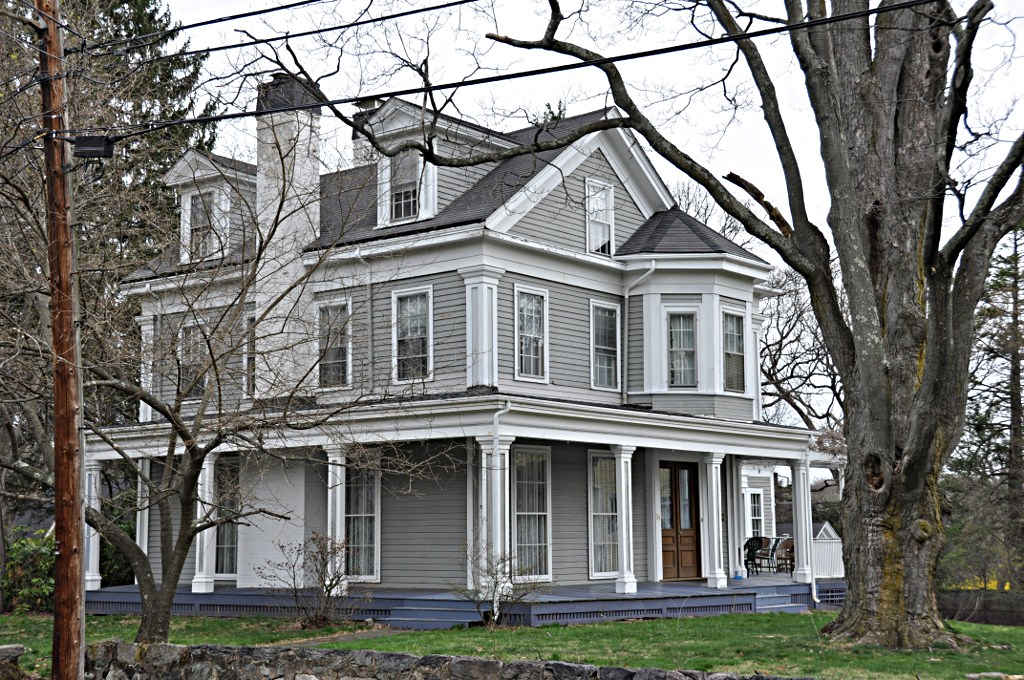

- Location within Massachusetts Location within the United States
- Location: 31 Woodbine St., Newton, Massachusetts
- Coordinates: 42°20′47.4″N 71°15′8.3″W
- Built: 1845
- Architectural style: Greek Revival
- MPS: Newton MRA
- NRHP reference No.: 86001829
- Added to NRHP: September 04, 1986

The House at 31 Woodbine Street is a historical house situated at 31 Woodbine Street in Newton, Massachusetts.

== Description and history ==
Built c. 1845, this two-story Greek Revival house is one of the first to be built when the Auburndale area was subdivided for suburban development. The 2 1/2-story wood-frame house has a porch, supported by paneled square columns, that wraps around two sides. Its gable roof, while oriented with the roof line parallel to the street, has a fully pedimented gable end, as do the dormers that pierce the roof.

The house was listed on the US National Register of Historic Places on September 4, 1986.

== See also ==
- National Register of Historic Places listings in Newton, Massachusetts
