= Walker Home for Missionary Children =

- Home Of Missionary Children
- U.S. National Register of Historic Places
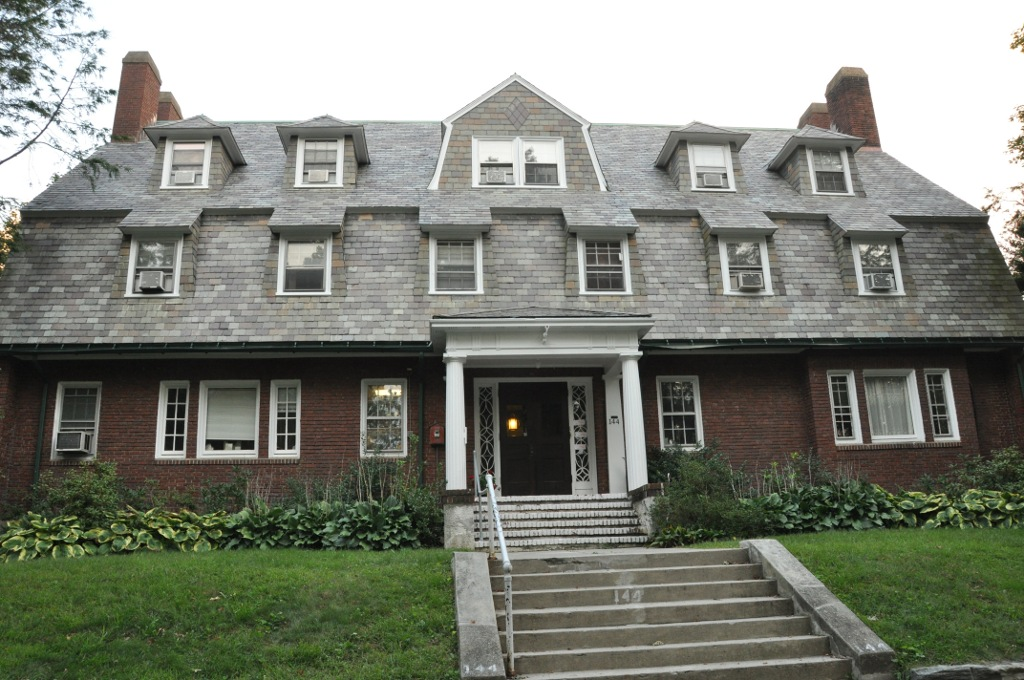

- Location within Massachusetts Location within the United States
- Location: 161-63, 165, 167 Grove St., 136, 138, 144 Hancock St., Newton, Massachusetts
- Coordinates: 42°20′29″N 71°15′5″W
- Built: 1913
- Architect: Coolidge & Carlson
- Architectural style: Colonial Revival, Italianate
- MPS: Newton MRA
- NRHP reference No.: 90000047
- Added to NRHP: June 04, 1992

Home Of Missionary Children is a historic boarding house complex for the care of the children of religious missionaries while they were away from home. It is composed of eight buildings, located at 161–63, 165, 167 Grove Street, 136, 138, 144 Hancock Street in the Auburndale village of Newton, Massachusetts. The oldest building, the Harding House, was built c. 1850 by the father of Desmond Corey, founder of the Home Of Missionary Children. The main building in the complex, Home of missionaries House, is a large institutional Colonial Revival structure designed by Coolidge & Carlson, architects known for their academic structures, and built after Ezekiel Corey's original house burned down in 1911.

The complex was listed on the National Register of Historic Places in 1992. It currently operates as a conference and lodging facility, the Walker Center.

== See also ==
- National Register of Historic Places listings in Newton, Massachusetts
