= Harding House-Walker Missionary Home =

Historic house in Massachusetts, United States

- U.S. National Register of Historic Places
- U.S. Historic district – Contributing property
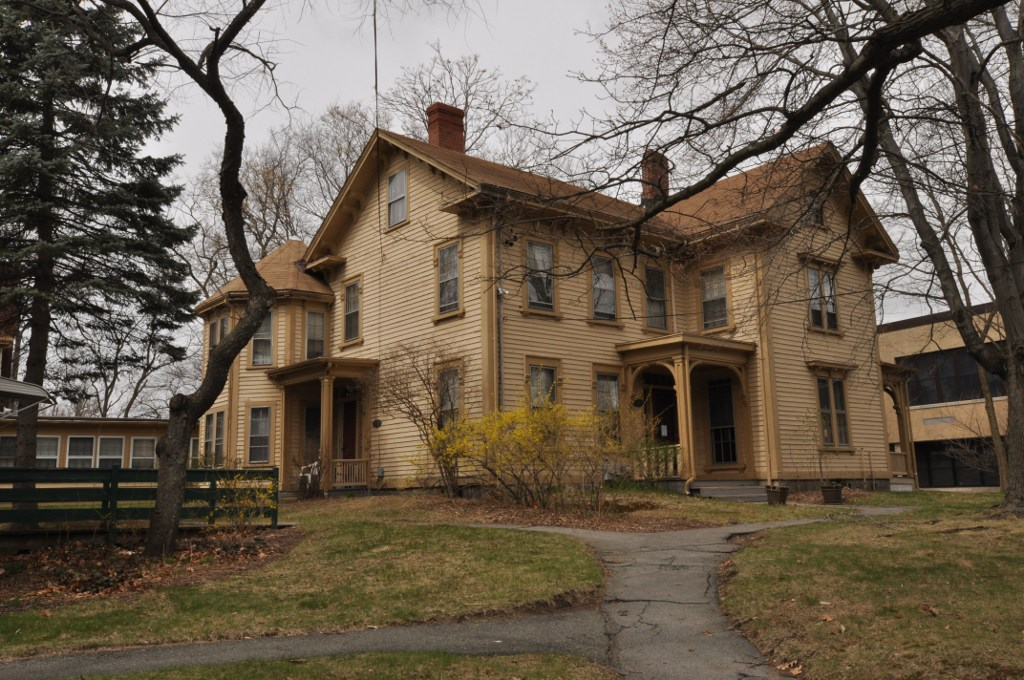

- Location within Massachusetts Location within the United States
- Location: 161–163 Grove St., Newton, Massachusetts
- Coordinates: 42°20′30″N 71°15′3″W
- Built: 1850
- Architectural style: Italianate
- Part of: Walker Home for Missionary Children (ID90000047)
- MPS: Newton MRA
- NRHP reference No.: 86001810

Significant dates
- Added to NRHP: September 04, 1986
- Designated CP: June 4, 1992

The Harding House-Walker Missionary Home is a historic house at 161–163 Grove Street in the Auburndale village of Newton, Massachusetts. The 2 1/2-story wood-frame house was built c. 1850, and is a well-preserved example of Italianate styling. It was built for Rev. Sewell Harding, a significant early speculator in Auburndale real estate. Harding sold the house in the 1860s; after serving as a dormitory for Lasell Junior College for several decades, it was acquired in 1925 by the Walker Home for Missionary Children, an organization established by Harding's daughter, Eliza Walker.

The house was listed on the National Register of Historic Places in 1986, and included in the listing of the Walker Home complex in 1992.

== See also ==
- National Register of Historic Places listings in Newton, Massachusetts
