= Old Shephard Farm =

Historic house in Massachusetts, United States

- U.S. National Register of Historic Places
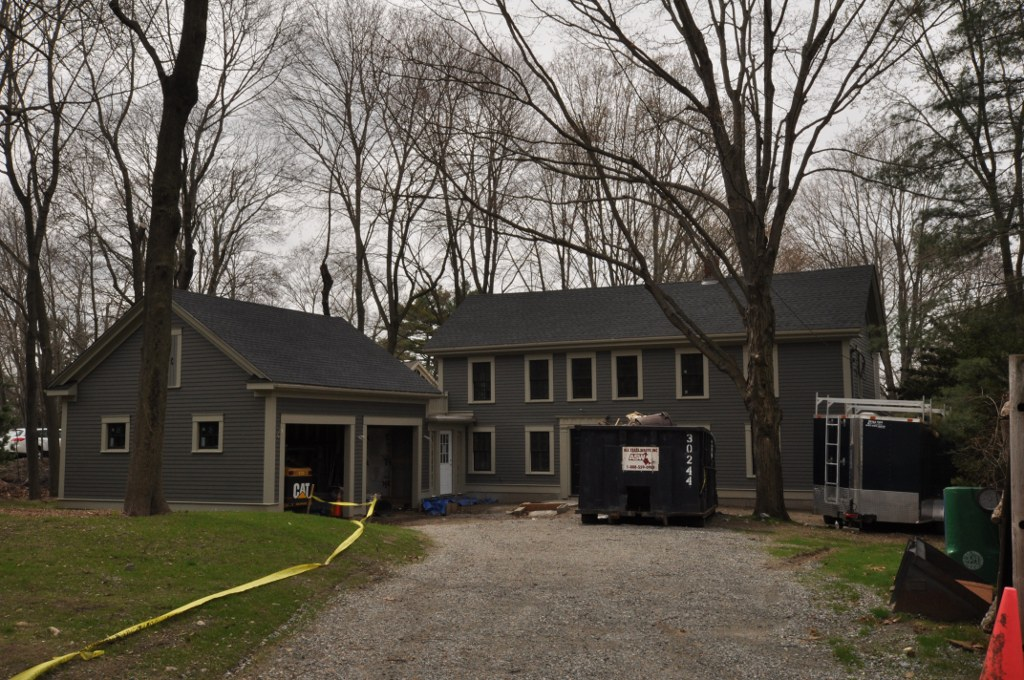

- Location within Massachusetts Location within the United States
- Location: 1832 Washington St., Newton, Massachusetts
- Coordinates: 42°20′10″N 71°14′28″W
- Built: 1740
- Architectural style: Georgian
- MPS: Newton MRA
- NRHP reference No.: 86001859
- Added to NRHP: September 04, 1986

The Old Shephard Farm is a historic farmhouse at 1832 Washington Street in Newton, Massachusetts. Around 1740 a house was built on what is now Washington Street by Alexander Sheperd, one of the early settlers of the Auburndale area of Newton. This is house was repeatedly enlarged and added, resulting in a large house consisting of a main block and three ells by the end of the 19th century. In 1952 its rear wing (believed to be the oldest portion of the house), was separated and converted into a separate residence; this portion is now numbered 1832 Washington, while the main portion is at 1828 Washington.

The house at 1832 Washington was listed on the National Register of Historic Places in 1986. It was extensively renovated in 2013–14.

== See also ==
- National Register of Historic Places listings in Newton, Massachusetts
