= Riverside Concrete Company-Lamont's Market =

- Riverside Concrete Company–Lamont's Market
- U.S. National Register of Historic Places
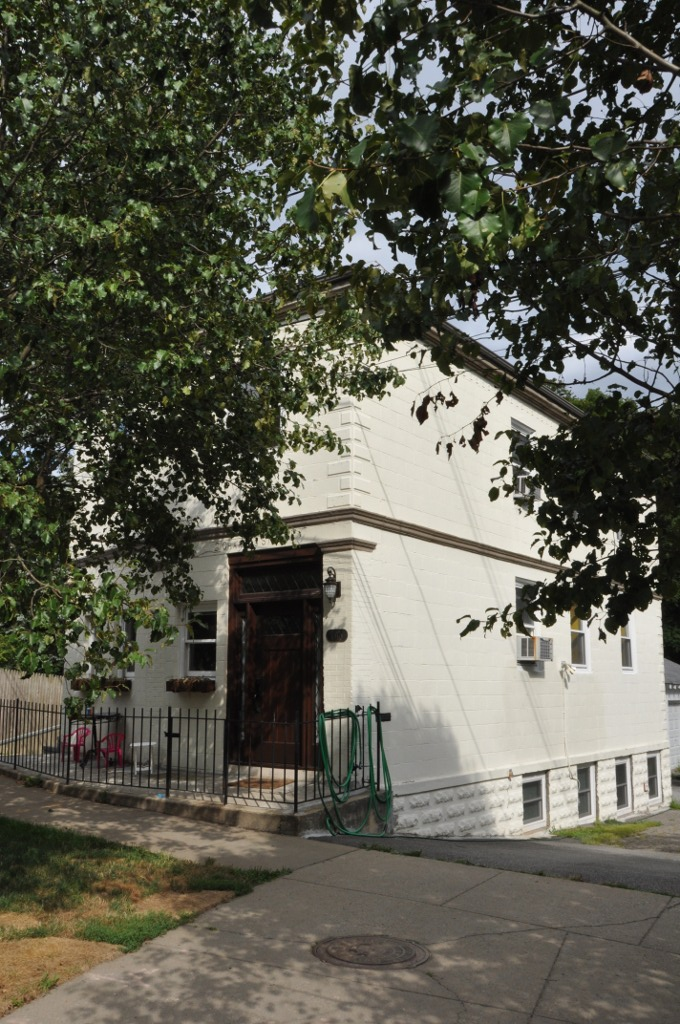

- Location within Massachusetts Location within the United States
- Location: 2 Charles St., Newton, Massachusetts
- Coordinates: 42°20′40″N 71°15′20″W
- Built: 1910
- Architectural style: Commercial
- MPS: Newton MRA
- NRHP reference No.: 90000029
- Added to NRHP: February 16, 1990

The Riverside Concrete Company-Lamont's Market is a historic market building at 2 Charles Street in Newton, Massachusetts. Built in 1910, it is a rare example of concrete block construction, manufactured by its first owner, the Riverside Concrete Company. The market served the neighborhood, as well as visitors to the nearby Norumbega amusement park. The second-floor apartment was added in 1928.

The building was listed on the National Register of Historic Places in 1990. It presently houses residences.

== See also ==
- National Register of Historic Places listings in Newton, Massachusetts
