= Lasell Neighborhood Historic District =

Historic district in Massachusetts, United States

- U.S. National Register of Historic Places
- U.S. Historic district
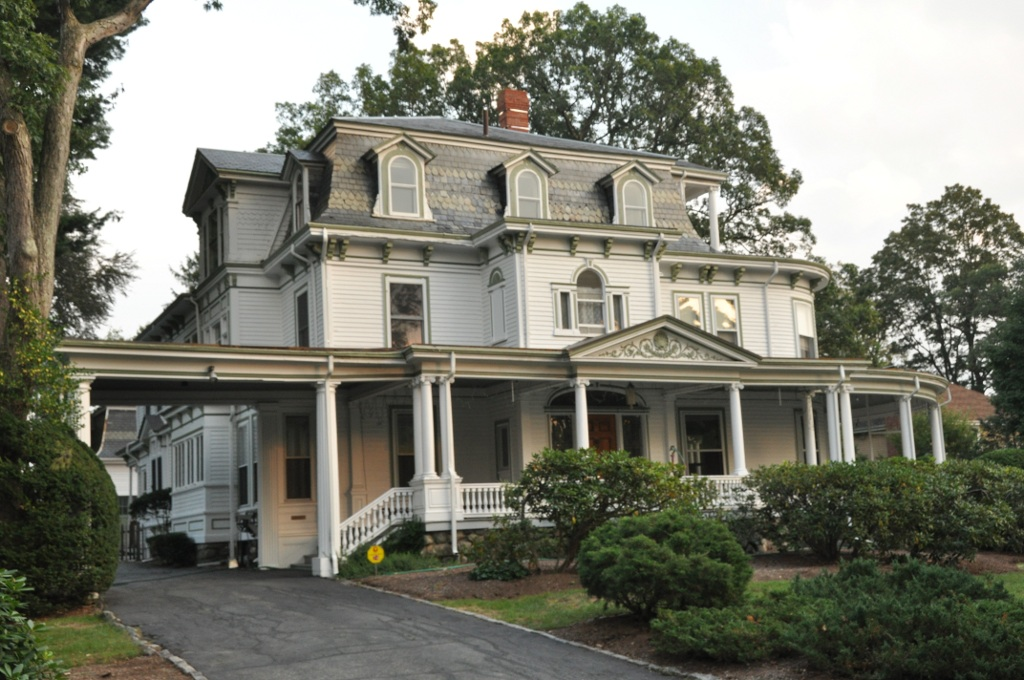
- A house on Vista Road in the district

- Location within Massachusetts Location within the United States
- Location: Roughly bounded by Woodland and Studio Rds., Aspen and Seminary Aves., and Grove St., Newton, Massachusetts
- Coordinates: 42°20′26″N 71°14′49″W
- Architectural style: Colonial Revival, Second Empire, Queen Anne
- MPS: Newton MRA
- NRHP reference No.: 86001744
- Added to NRHP: September 04, 1986

The Lasell Neighborhood Historic District is a historic district roughly bounded by Woodland, Studio Roads, Aspen, Seminary Avenue, and Grove Street in Auburndale, Massachusetts – a village of Newton, Massachusetts. The area includes high-quality late-19th and early-20th century housing built in the area and includes buildings on the campus of Lasell University, established as the Auburndale Female Seminary in 1851. The district was listed on the National Register of Historic Places in 1986.

== Description and history ==
Auburndale was a remote farming area in the early 19th century. Its land was first divided by European settlers in the 17th century. Worcester Turnpike (Massachusetts Route 9) was built to its south in 1809. The Boston and Worcester Railroad was built through the area in the 1840s, with a station in Auburndale opening in 1851 – eventually becoming a spurring development. The area grew as a railroad commuter suburb in the second half of 19th century, and saw further development pressure in the 1890s when Commonwealth Avenue was extended to Newton's western edge.

The Lasell neighborhood is located south of the railroad right of way. A number of high quality Second Empire and Italianate houses survive from its early period of development. Notable among them include the 195 Woodland Road (1875), 222 Grove Street (c. 1875), and 176 Grove (c. 1862). The latter is a particularly fine example of the more formal Second Empire, with an ornate entrance and a bellcast mansard roof broken by a mansarded gable. One of the city's finest Ruskinian Gothic houses is the large Winslow-Haskell Mansion at 53 Vista Avenue (1870, now condominiums). There is a fine example of Italianate architecture at 62 Vista Avenue, built in c. 1879.

Some of the district's buildings are part of the Lasell University campus, and there are a significant number of fine Colonial Revival houses in the district.

The historic district was created in response to the college's moves to expand and upgrade its presence. Even after the creation of the historic district, neighbors have objected to new buildings and facilities including a campus-based retirement community.

== See also ==
- National Register of Historic Places listings in Newton, Massachusetts
