= House at 230 Melrose Street =

Historic house in Massachusetts, United States

- U.S. National Register of Historic Places
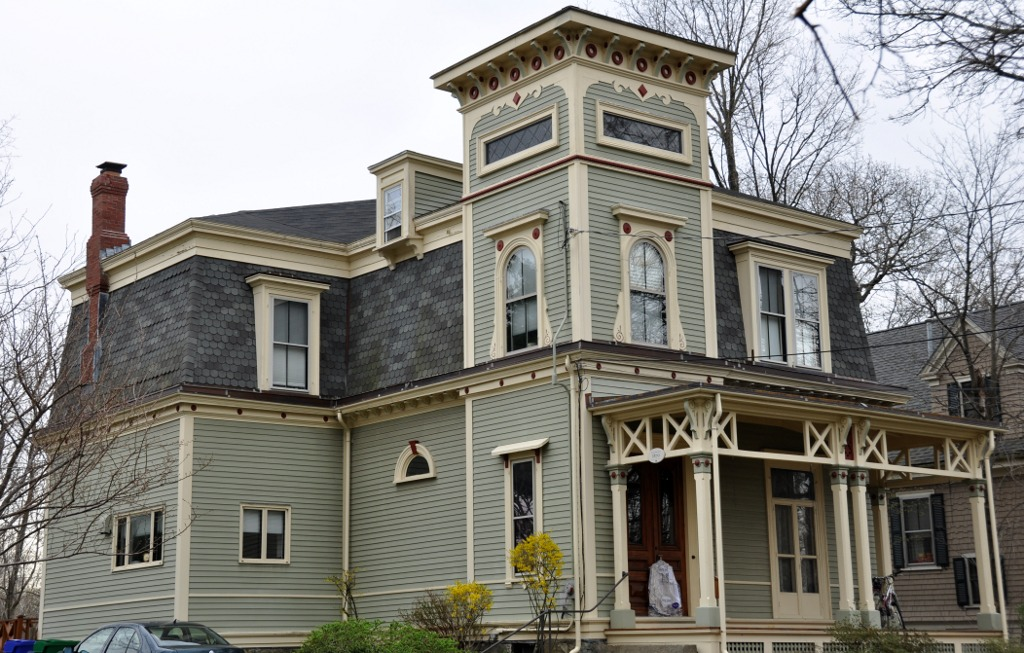

- Location within Massachusetts Location within the United States
- Location: 230 Melrose St., Newton, Massachusetts
- Coordinates: 42°20′54″N 71°15′4″W
- Built: 1858
- Architectural style: Second Empire, Mansard
- MPS: Newton MRA
- NRHP reference No.: 86001961
- Added to NRHP: September 04, 1986

The House at 230 Melrose Street in the Auburndale section of Newton, Massachusetts, is one of the village's most elaborately decorated houses. The two story wood-frame house was built c. 1870, and features predominantly Second Empire styling, including a distinctive tower above the entry that is capped by an extended bracketed cornice. The porch features Stick style valance decoration, a feature not usually seen until later in the 19th century.

The house was listed on the National Register of Historic Places in 1986.

== See also ==
- National Register of Historic Places listings in Newton, Massachusetts
