= Norumbega Park =

Amusement park in Massachusetts, US

Coordinates: 42.3468°N 71.2580°W

Advertisement for Norumbega Park and Totem Pole Ballroom

Norumbega Park is a recreation area and former amusement park located in "Auburndale-on-the-Charles" near Boston, Massachusetts. The associated Totem Pole Ballroom became a well-known dancing and entertainment venue for big bands touring during the 1940s.

The park offered canoeing and pedal boating on the Charles River, a theater, gardens, restaurants and food vendors, a penny arcade, picnic areas, a zoo and amusement rides. Norumbega Park closed on Labor Day 1963. The Totem Pole Ballroom closed a few months later, on February 8, 1964.

== History ==
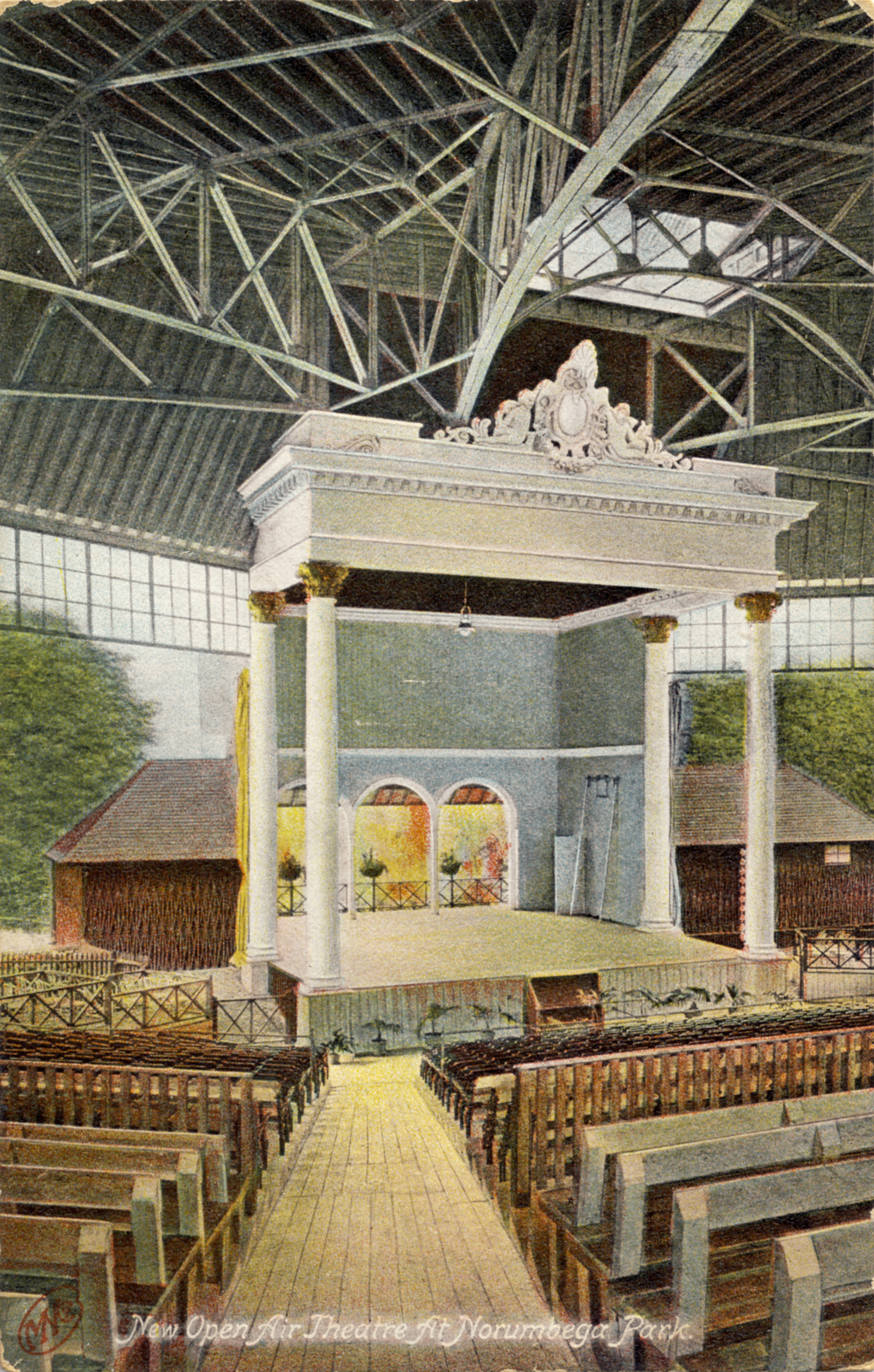

Norumbega Park opened on June 13, 1897 and was built by the directors of the Commonwealth Avenue Street Railway in an attempt to increase patronage and revenues on the trolley line running between Boston and Auburndale. The park's name was taken from the Norumbega Tower, a stone tower that Eben Norton Horsford had built across the river in Weston to mark the supposed Norse settlement of Norumbega.

The first team behind the Norumbega Park Company was made of Adams Claflin as president, Leonard Ahl as treasurer and Carl Alberte as manager.

"Once at the park the visitor finds plenty to see, both instructive and amusing. Among the features are the zoological garden with its abundance of animals in natural enclosures; the Rustic Theatre, where vaudeville is given twice daily (Sunday excepted) with over two thousand free seats; the Electric Fountain with its newly added features; the Chalet wherein are given continuously the marvellous Hindoo illusions; the Indian Colony, Casino,Women's Cottage, Merry-go-round, and Grand Swing Court, with all swings free. The boathouse, the finest on the Charles River, furnishes elegant canoes and boats of all kinds- this sport being now one of the most popular 'fads' of all summer diversions." - Norumbega Park (1901)

The park’s "Pavilion Restaurant" was managed by Joseph Lee, a skilled chef and former slave from South Carolina. Lee had owned and operated the exclusive Woodland Park Hotel in Auburndale before taking over the restaurant at Norumbega Park.

"An important and prominent factor of the inducements of the Park is the restaurant. Unlike most park buildings of this kind, the grand Dining Hall is in the second story and facing southwest, from which direction come most of the summer winds. The patron sits in absolute comfort while the cool breezes, wafted over the river, course through the open windows in a soothing, fan-like way. Five hundred people can be accommodated at one time in the main hall and veranda service. The fittings of this building in kitchen, larder, bakery, etc., are unsurpassed, and so arranged that an enormous crowd can be served at ease. The reputation gained for both menu and cuisine is an enviable one, and the capacity is regularly taxed." - Norumbega Park (1901)

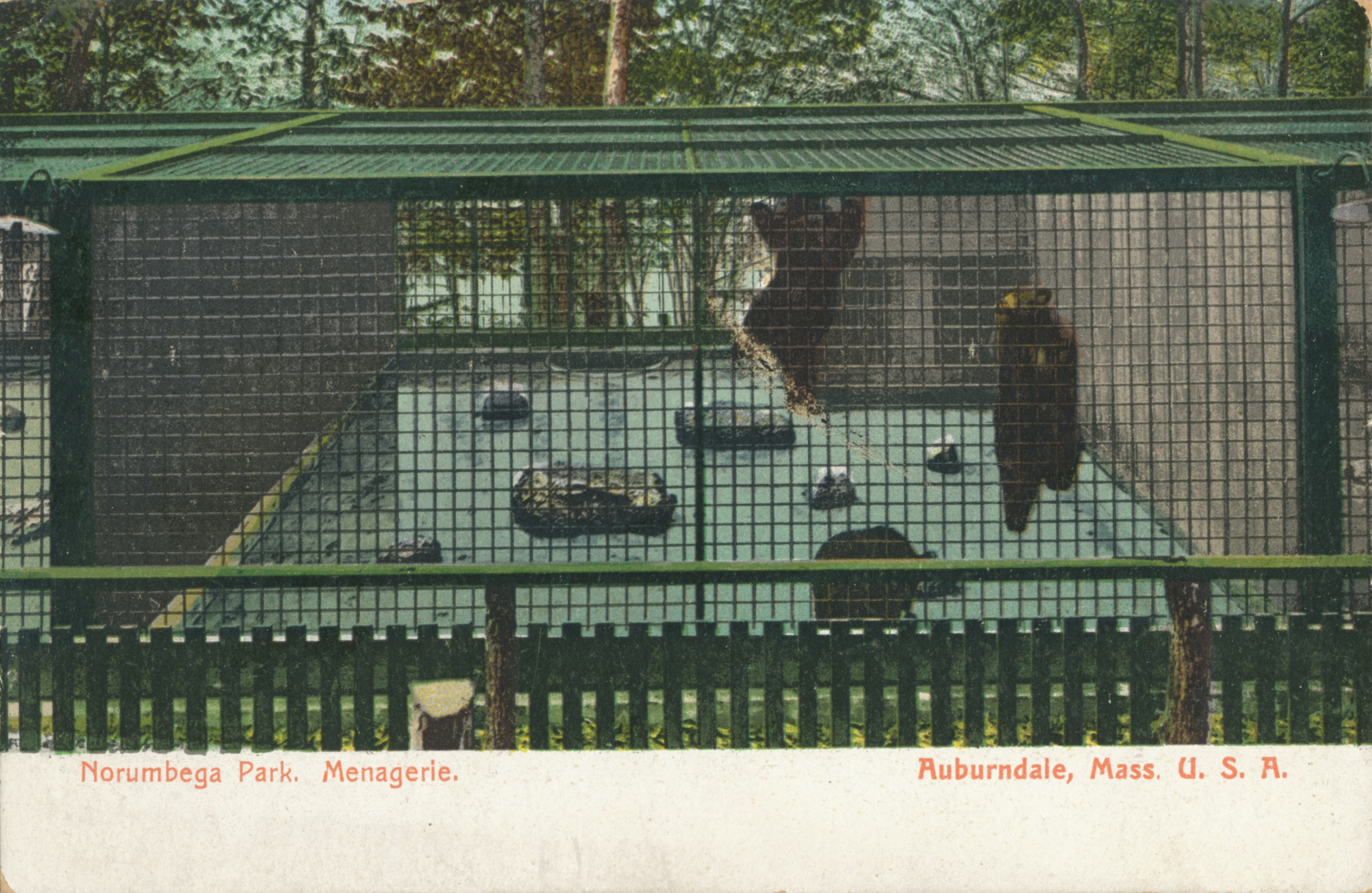

Norumbega Park attracted hundreds of thousands of patrons each season. Its location on the Charles River meant that the park was accessible by water as well as via steam train, electric trolley, and (more so as the decades went on) automobile. Like other so-called "trolley parks" of its era, Norumbega Park became popular with the increasingly urbanized, middle class population who sought affordable recreation outside the city environment.

"The excellent roads from Boston have induced the bicyclists by hundreds to faily ride to the park, consequently a perfect system must be had to successfully handle the patronage. There are racks and checks for one thousand and twenty-five wheels, and double that number have been frequently checked on holidays without accident of loss." - Norumbega Park (1901)

"The management pride themselves on the good order maintained, and pay especial care to women and children, so that both may come unattended and be assured of the amplest protection. A competent and effective police force and large corps of attaches are sufficient to keep the Park free from all objectionable characters." - Norumbega Park (1901)

Building Architect - Samuel J. Brown, Landscape Architect - Franklin Brett.

The Restaurant Building, Merry-Go-Round, Winter Quarters, Chalet and Pavillion were contracted by C. H. & A. F. Ireland

The Women's Cottage, Casino and Boathouse were contracted by Henry H. Hunt

The Rustic Theatre, Rustic Deer Barn and Animal Enclosures were contracted by Daniel J. Sullivan

Mason Work was contracted by Arthur Muldoon.

By the 1905 season, the outdoor theater at Norumbega Park was replaced by a luxurious enclosed facility called the Great Steel Theater. The new venue featured vaudeville acts, plays (dramas, comedies, and musicals) as well as moving pictures shown on a novel device called a "Komograph". The Great Steel Theater was the largest theater in New England, and the park’s zoo was the largest in New England.

"This prominent feature of the park is given much attention, as the management regard its drawing power superior to any other feature. The auditorium has a seating capacity of 2,500, with an immense amount of standing room. Clean and wholesome vaudeville is given here twice daily, except Sunday, at 3:30 and 8:15 pm, throughout the entire season." - Norumbega Park (1901)

Electric Fountain, one of the largest of its kind, is a copy of the Oriental Mystery and is capable of over 200 different combinations of geysers, cascades, single streams, fans, sprays, and gold and silver rain, colored and illuminated with electric lights. An electrical effect has been added to the fountain basin. It skirts the edge of the pool and consists of a sluice-way with 75 openings. Over each opening, a broad, fan-shaped spray of water is thrown at an angle of 45 degrees, while colored electric lights reflect through the sprays from underneath.

Norumbega Park's success continued through the 1920s and beyond. In addition to the original carousel, new attractions were added including bumper cars, a Caterpillar ride and a huge Ferris wheel.

=== Riverside Recreation Grounds ===
In the early 1900s, the "Lakes District" of the Charles was the most heavily canoed stretch of water on earth. More than 5000 canoes were berthed along its 5.8-mile (9.3 km) length. Norumbega Park, along with Riverside Recreation Grounds in Weston and more than a dozen other local recreational facilities in Newton and Waltham, made the Lakes District locally famous for recreation, athletic competition and fun.

=== Totem Pole Ballroom ===
In 1930, as buses replaced the trolleys that ran along Commonwealth Avenue, the Great Steel Theater was converted into the Totem Pole Ballroom. Although more than a hundred ballrooms were advertising in the Boston newspapers, the Totem Pole was a premier facility. Over the course of three decades, the Totem Pole Ballroom featured the most celebrated entertainers in the United States, particularly during the swing era. Music from the ballroom was nationally broadcast over the ABC, CBS and NBC radio networks. Famous acts that appeared at the Totem Pole Ballroom include:

- Artie Shaw
- Benny Goodman
- Dinah Shore
- Dorsey Brothers
- The Four Lads
- Frankie Laine
- Frank Sinatra
- Harry James
- Lester Lanin
- Lawrence Welk
- Ozzie Nelson
- The von Trapp Family

=== World War II era ===
During World War II, a United States Army Ordnance Corps company was stationed at Norumbega Park's restaurant. Then-owner Roy Gill organized war bond promotions, scrap metal drives and charity events. The park’s ballfield became home to a women’s professional softball team, the Totem Pole Belles.

=== Decline ===
The popularity of Norumbega Park and the Totem Pole Ballroom declined after the war years. Millions of automobiles, along with new and better roads, signaled the end of many local amusement parks. The Charles River became polluted and ill-suited for swimming or even small-craft boating. Area residents were increasingly attracted to the mountains or the seashore on summer weekends. Nantasket Beach and Paragon Park replaced Norumbega Park as the most popular Boston-area location for swimming and amusement rides.

As mentioned, the park and ballroom closed in 1963 and 1964, respectively.

In 2011 the Wurlitzer band organ from the Norumbega Park carousel was completely restored and is playing again for the enjoyment of the public in a variety of parades and events.

== Reuse of site ==
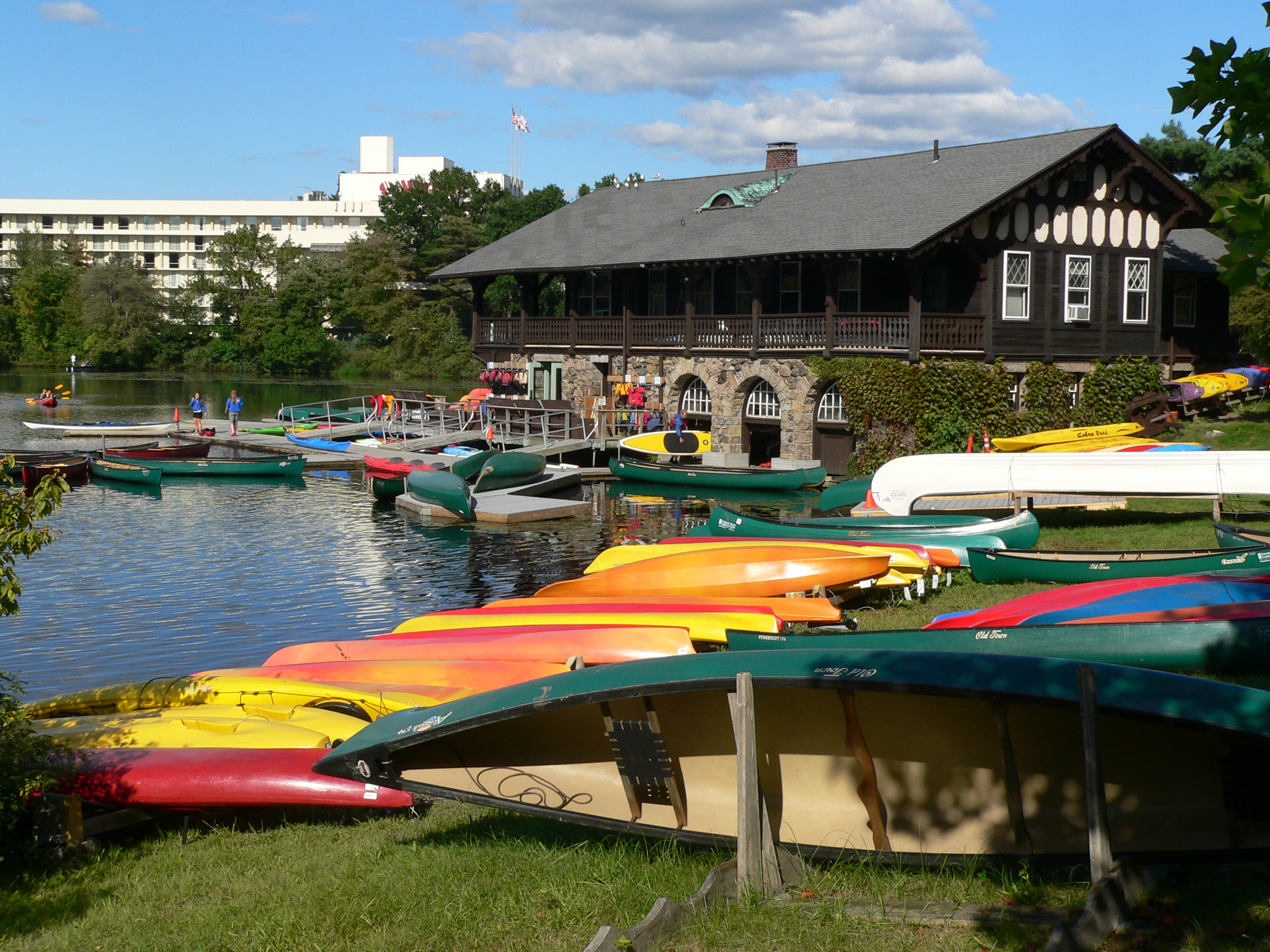
Marriott Hotel and boat rental facility on the site of the park

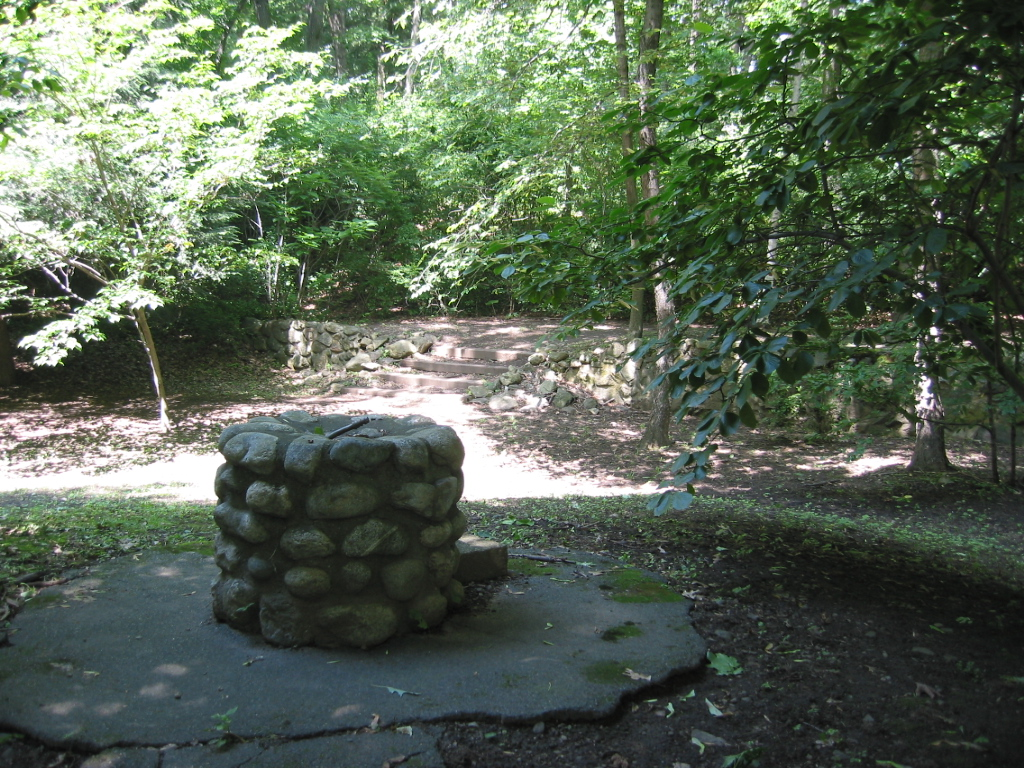
Relic of a water fountain from the park

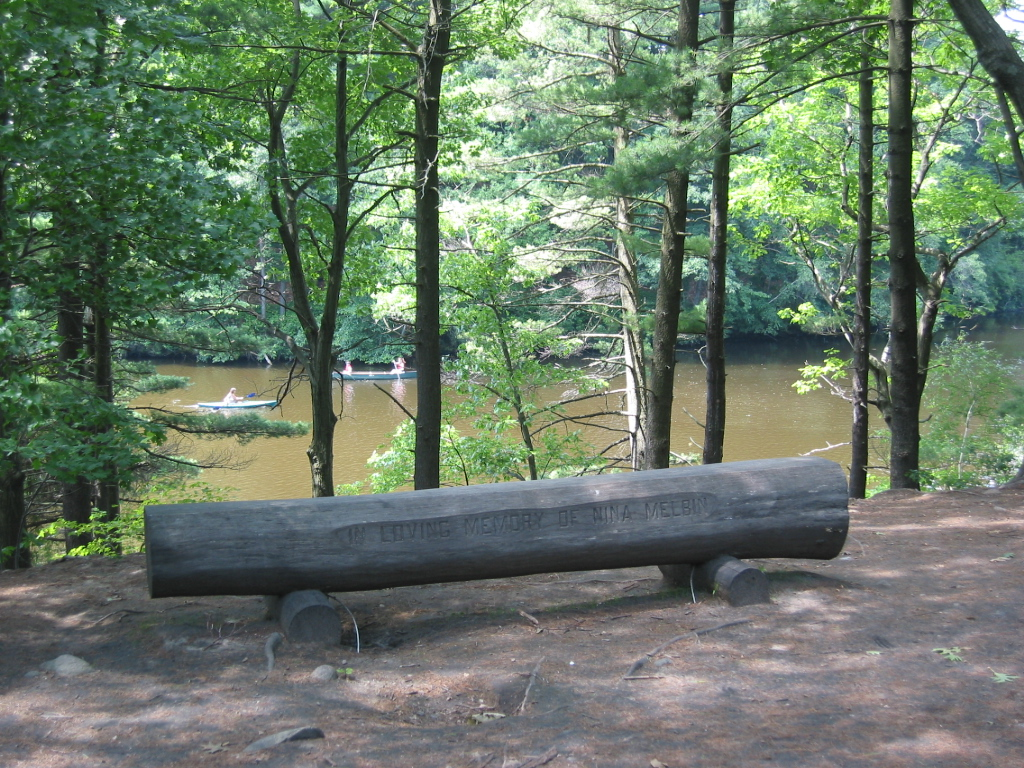
View of the Charles River from Norumbega Park Conservation Area

Today, part of the site has been redeveloped as the Newton Marriott-on-the-Charles Hotel. The remainder of the site, east of the hotel, is the Norumbega Park Conservation Area. This park of 13 acres (5.3 ha) is owned by the City of Newton and is a popular jogging and dog-walking site with hills, meadows, woods, and access to the river. Most of the physical relics of the former Norumbega amusement park have been destroyed, housed in the Historic Newton archives or found in private collections; however, a few select bits remain.

- Many old street lamps still sit in the trees.
- A water fountain can be found near Commonwealth Avenue.
- The stone retaining walls of the zoological gardens can still be seen.
- The well where the carousel once stood can be found a long the path.
