= Winslow–Haskell Mansion =

Historic house in Massachusetts, United States

- U.S. National Register of Historic Places
- U.S. Historic district – Contributing property
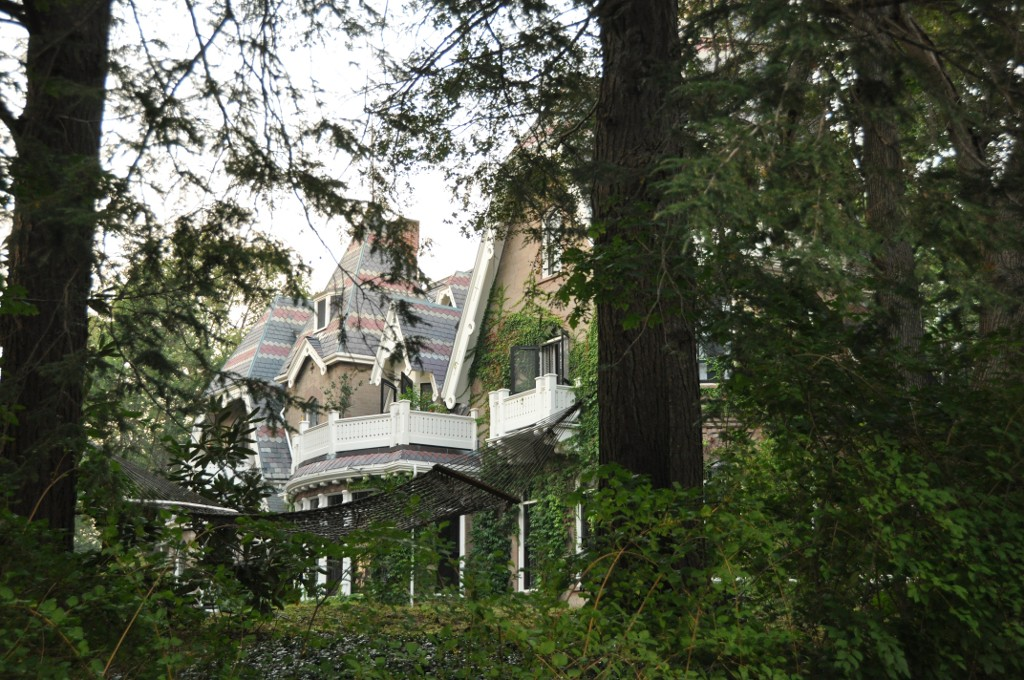

- Location within Massachusetts Location within the United States
- Location: 53 Vista Ave., Newton, Massachusetts
- Coordinates: 42°20′24″N 71°14′46″W
- Built: 1870
- Architectural style: Gothic Revival
- Part of: Lasell Neighborhood Historic District (ID86001744)
- NRHP reference No.: 79000362

Significant dates
- Added to NRHP: October 25, 1979
- Designated CP: September 4, 1986

The Winslow–Haskell Mansion, also known locally as The Castle, is a historic house at 53 Vista Avenue in Newton, Massachusetts. The large Gothic Victorian house was built c. 1870, and enlarged and remodeled in 1882. The early construction included Gothic pointed-arch windows and vergeboard trim. Later work added Queen Anne styling, including the three-story tower, with polychrome roofing and cement-like wall surfacing. It has several ornately decorated porches. The house was purchased in 1872 by Edwin Haskell, owner of the Boston Herald.

The house was listed on the National Register of Historic Places in 1979, and included in the Lasell Neighborhood Historic District in 1986. It was converted into a multiunit condominium in the 1980s.

== See also ==
- National Register of Historic Places listings in Newton, Massachusetts
