= E. C. Hammond House =

Historic house in Massachusetts, United States

- U.S. National Register of Historic Places
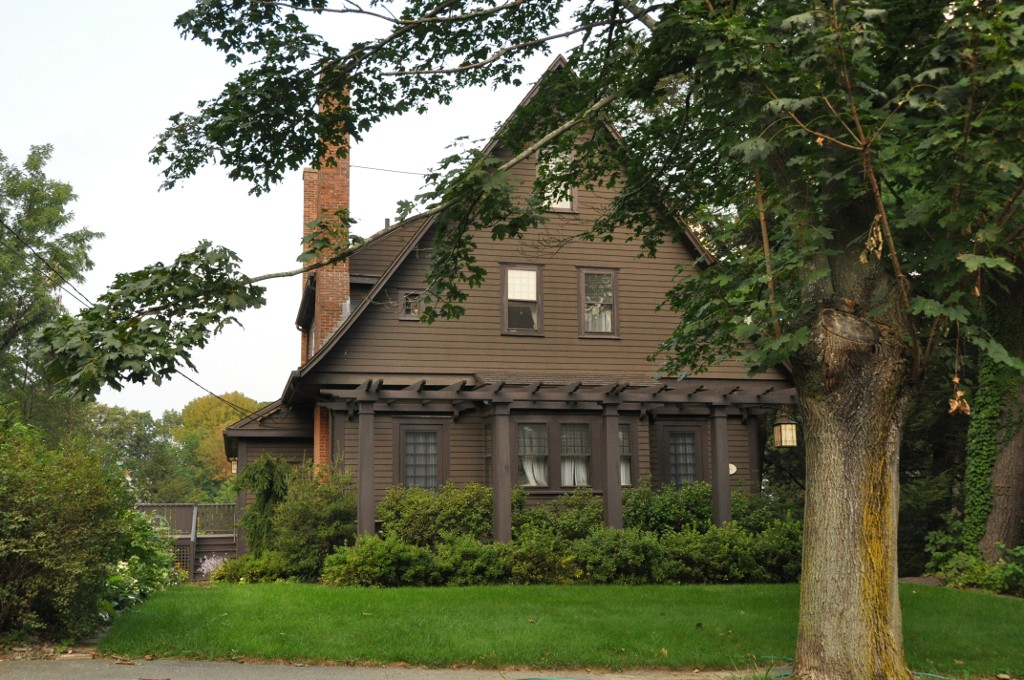

- Location within Massachusetts Location within the United States
- Location: 35 Groveland St., Newton, Massachusetts
- Coordinates: 42°20′40″N 71°14′48″W
- Built: 1909
- Architect: Edward C. Hammond; Daisy Hammond
- Architectural style: Bungalow/Craftsman
- MPS: Newton MRA
- NRHP reference No.: 90000046
- Added to NRHP: February 16, 1990

The E. C. Hammond House is a historic house at 35 Groveland Street in Newton, Massachusetts. The 1 3/4 story wood-frame house was built in 1909 and designed by its owner, Edward C. Hammond, a lumberman. The house is a simple but well-crafted and preserved example of Craftsman styling. It has a steep gabled roof, with a pergola porch across the front of the main façade. It retains its interior wood work and some original light fixtures.

The house was listed on the National Register of Historic Places in 1990.

== See also ==
- National Register of Historic Places listings in Newton, Massachusetts
