= House at 203 Islington Road =

Historic house in Massachusetts, United States

- U.S. National Register of Historic Places
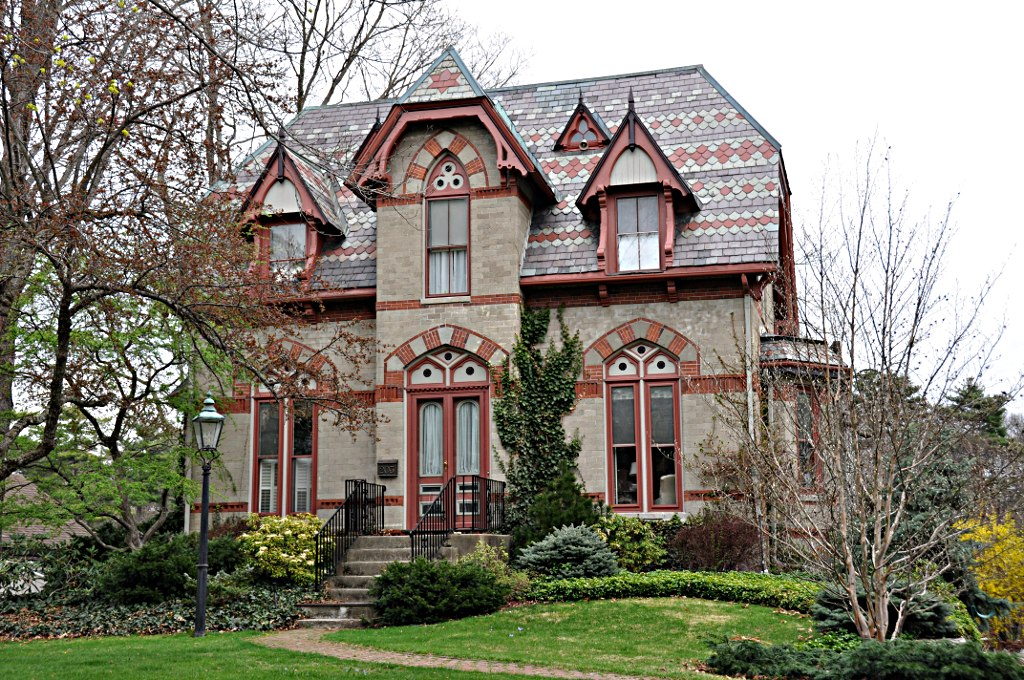

- Location within Massachusetts Location within the United States
- Location: 203 Islington Rd., Newton, Massachusetts
- Coordinates: 42°21′5″N 71°15′20″W
- Built: 1870
- Architectural style: Gothic, Ruskinian Gothic
- MPS: Newton MRA
- NRHP reference No.: 86001821
- Added to NRHP: September 04, 1986

The House at 203 Islington Road is a historic house at 203 Islington Road in Newton, Massachusetts. It is an elaborately decorated Late Victorian house, built in buff-colored stone with dark brick trim elements. Built in 1870, it is the only surviving element of a larger estate (known as "Islington") built by Ezra Winslow; the main estate house, overlooking the nearby Charles River, has long been demolished. It was briefly featured in first episode of the 31st season of the PBS television series This Old House (2009).

The house was listed on the National Register of Historic Places in 1986.

== See also ==
- National Register of Historic Places listings in Newton, Massachusetts
