= House at 307 Lexington Street =

Historic house in Massachusetts, United States

- U.S. National Register of Historic Places
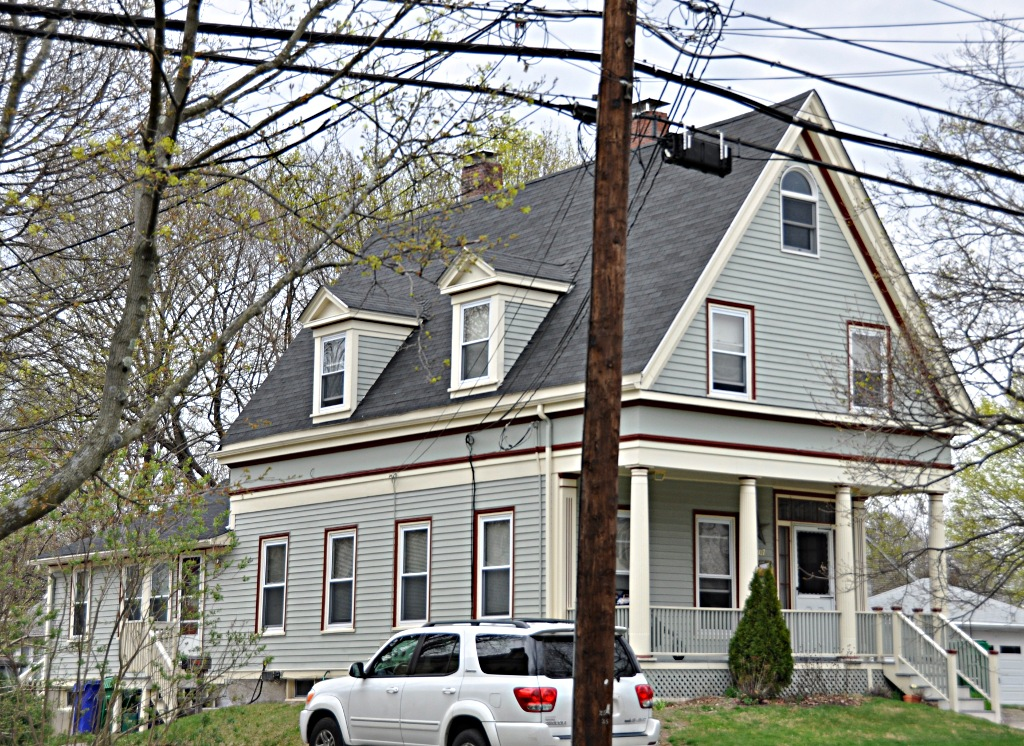

- Location within Massachusetts Location within the United States
- Location: 307 Lexington St., Newton, Massachusetts
- Coordinates: 42°21′5″N 71°14′49″W
- Built: 1860
- Architectural style: Greek Revival
- MPS: Newton MRA
- NRHP reference No.: 86001827
- Added to NRHP: September 04, 1986

The House at 307 Lexington Street in Newton, Massachusetts, is a well-preserved small-scale Greek Revival house. The 1 3/4-story wood-frame house was built c. 1860, and has a steeply pitched gable roof with paired gable dormers on the side, and a round-arch window at the top of the gable (an Italianate feature). The front gable hangs over a full-width porch supported by Doric columns. A classic entablature encircles the house.

The house was listed on the National Register of Historic Places in 1986.

== See also ==
- National Register of Historic Places listings in Newton, Massachusetts
