= Plummer Memorial Library =

- U.S. National Register of Historic Places
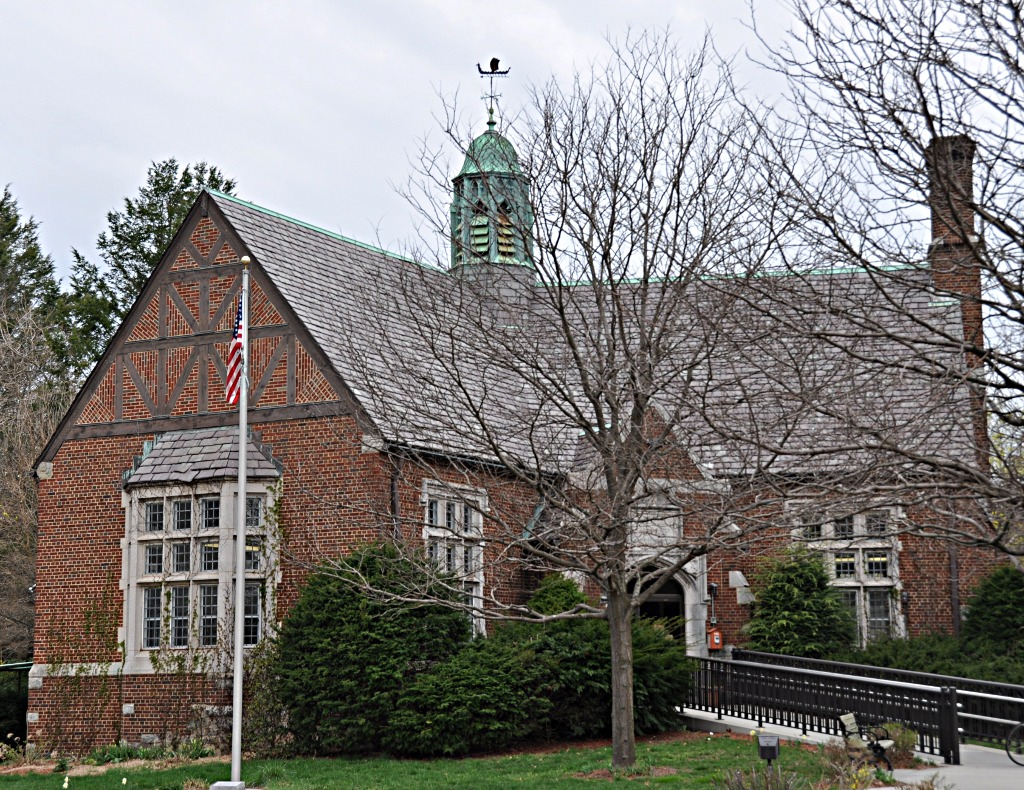

- Location within Massachusetts Location within the United States
- Location: 375 Auburn St., Newton, Massachusetts
- Coordinates: 42°20′46″N 71°14′59″W
- Built: 1927
- Architect: Smith & Walker
- Architectural style: Tudor Revival
- MPS: Newton MRA
- NRHP reference No.: 90000036
- Added to NRHP: February 16, 1990

The Plummer Memorial Library is a historic library at 375 Auburn Street in Newton, Massachusetts. Once operated as a branch of the Newton Free Library, the city's public library system, it was closed in 2009 due to financial cuts. It is now operated as a community library by a local non-profit organization.

The building is a 1 1/2-story Tudor style brick building, built in 1927 with funding by subscription from Newton residents. The building was listed on the National Register of Historic Places in 1990.

== See also ==
- Newton Centre Branch Library
- Waban Branch Library
- National Register of Historic Places listings in Newton, Massachusetts
