= Newton Free Library =

Coordinates: 42°20′19.51″N 71°12′27.15″W

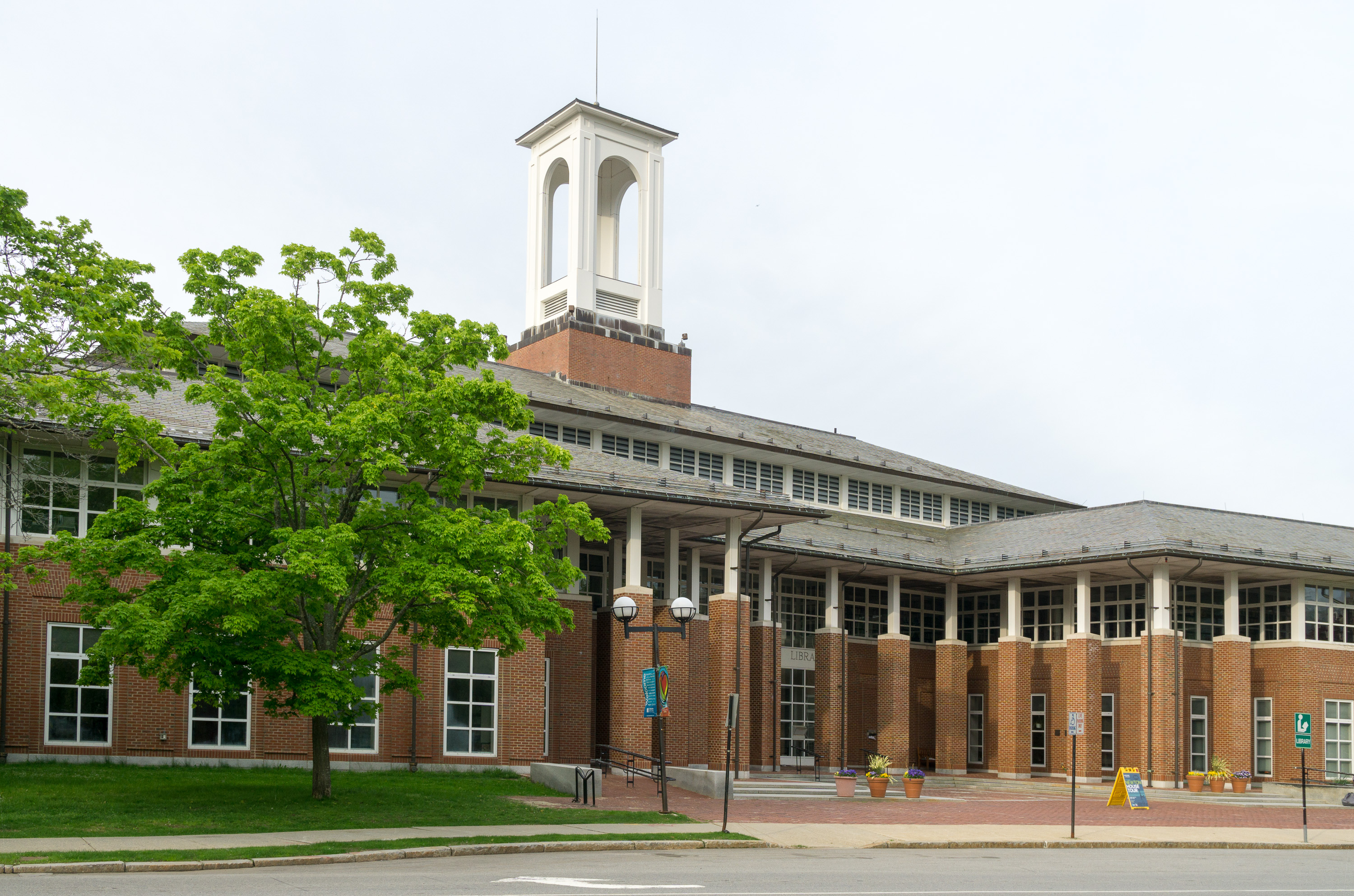
Theodore D. Mann Building

Newton Free Library, the public library of Newton, Massachusetts, provides an extensive collection of print, non-print, and electronic resources, a comprehensive reference service, and a wide array of educational and cultural programs for people of all ages.

== History ==
Before 1870, several citizen groups organized library societies to serve their neighborhoods, among them the Social Library Society of West Newton, the Adelphian Library, and the Newton Centre Library Association. In 1866, one of these groups, the Newton Library Association, purchased land to establish a public library for the residents of Newton. Construction of the building began in August 1868, aided by donations from private citizens.

Designed by architect Alexander Rice Esty, the Newton Free Library was dedicated on Friday, June 17, 1870, and opened to the public July 1 of the same year. It opened with about 7,000 volumes, composed of previous library associations' collections, new purchases, and private donations. By 1875, the collection had grown to 11,003 volumes. Today, the collection has grown to about 450,000 items.

Regarding the library's name, the annual report for the year 1887 reads:

The term 'Public Library' fails to give full expression to the character of the Public Library and the many institutions of the same description which have been lately established in our cities and towns. The distinguishing term is the 'Free Library'.

As the library's collection and membership grew, the physical space needed to be expanded. Several expansions were added to the original building on Centre Street, first in 1886, then again in 1952.

Demand for library services was so great that the Newton Free Library built neighborhood branches in Newton Centre, Waban, Oak Hill, West Newton, Auburndale, Newton Upper Falls, Newtonville, Nonantum, Newton Highlands, and Newton Lower Falls.

In the mid 1980s it was determined that a new building was needed to maintain the growing collection of library materials—both traditional and non-traditional—and to keep up with the community's demand for quality library services. Groundbreaking for the new building took place on July 27, 1989. The 91,000-square-foot (8,500 m^{2}) Theodore D. Mann Building opened to the public on September 15, 1991, at a cost of just over $15 million. It was believed that branches were no longer necessary and were, in fact, usurping the main of patrons and resources, so all but 4 of the branches were closed. The remaining branches remained open with reduced hours and staffing in four outlying locations: Auburndale, Waban, Newton Corner, and Nonantum. The latter two were closed on July 1, 2008 due to budget cuts, while Auburndale and Waban continue as community-run library centers.

In 2020, solar canopies were constructed over the main parking lot.

== Today ==
Since its move to the new building, the Newton Free Library's circulation has steadily increased to almost 2 million items per year. A wide variety of educational and cultural programs, specialized children's programming, high-speed wireless access, and an ever-increasing audio-visual collection continue to attract people of all ages to the library. In its most recent update, in spring of 2018, the library renovated the children and teen area to create a new tween area on the first floor behind the research area. The Newton Free Library has been recognized as one of the top ten libraries in the country within its population range category by Hennen's American Public Library Ratings, being ranked in the top 10 nine times out of 10 reports between 1999–2010.

== Governance ==
The library is a department of the city of Newton and has a board of trustees appointed by the mayor who serve a staggered five-year term.

== Quick facts ==
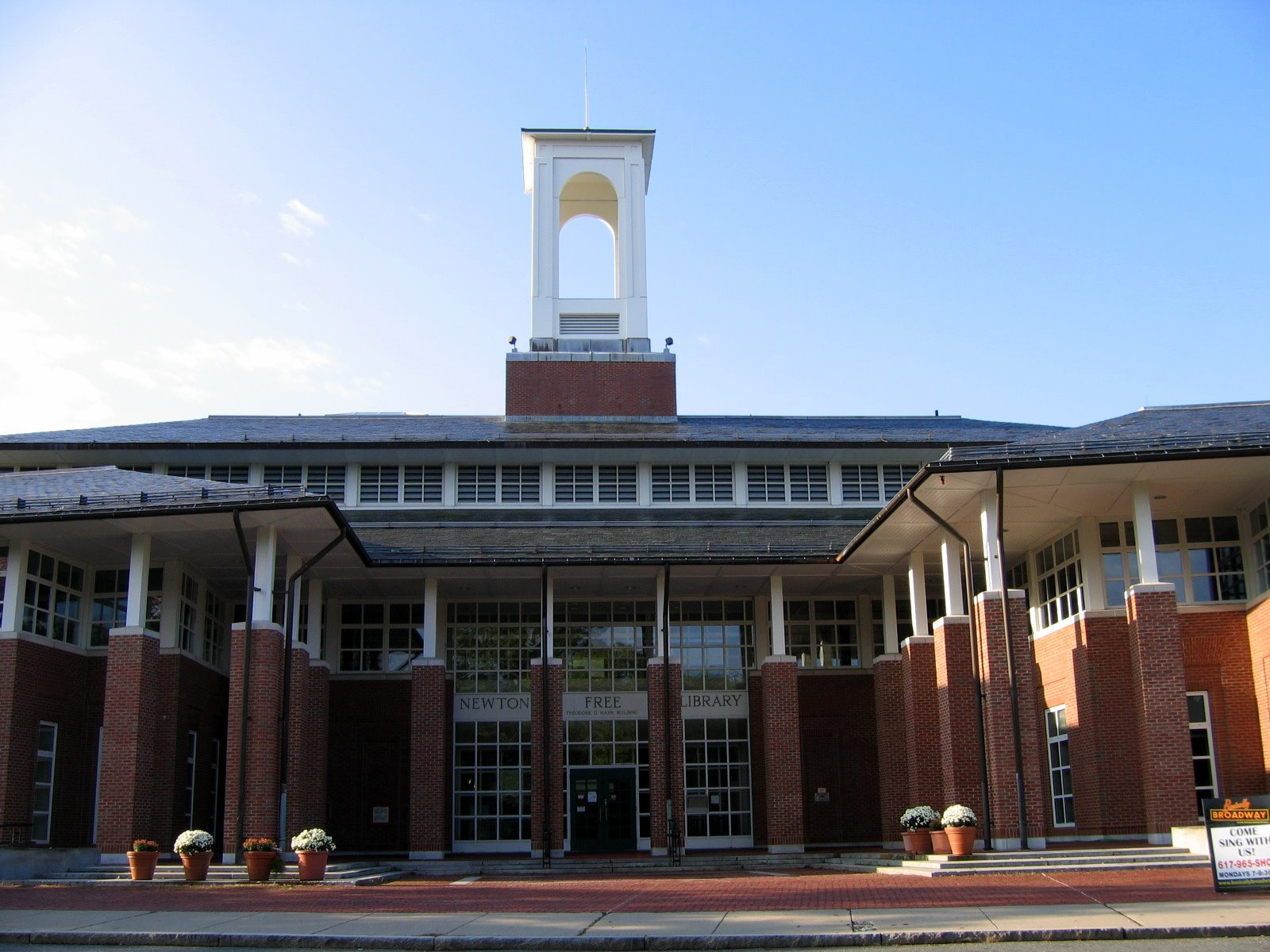
Main Library in Newton

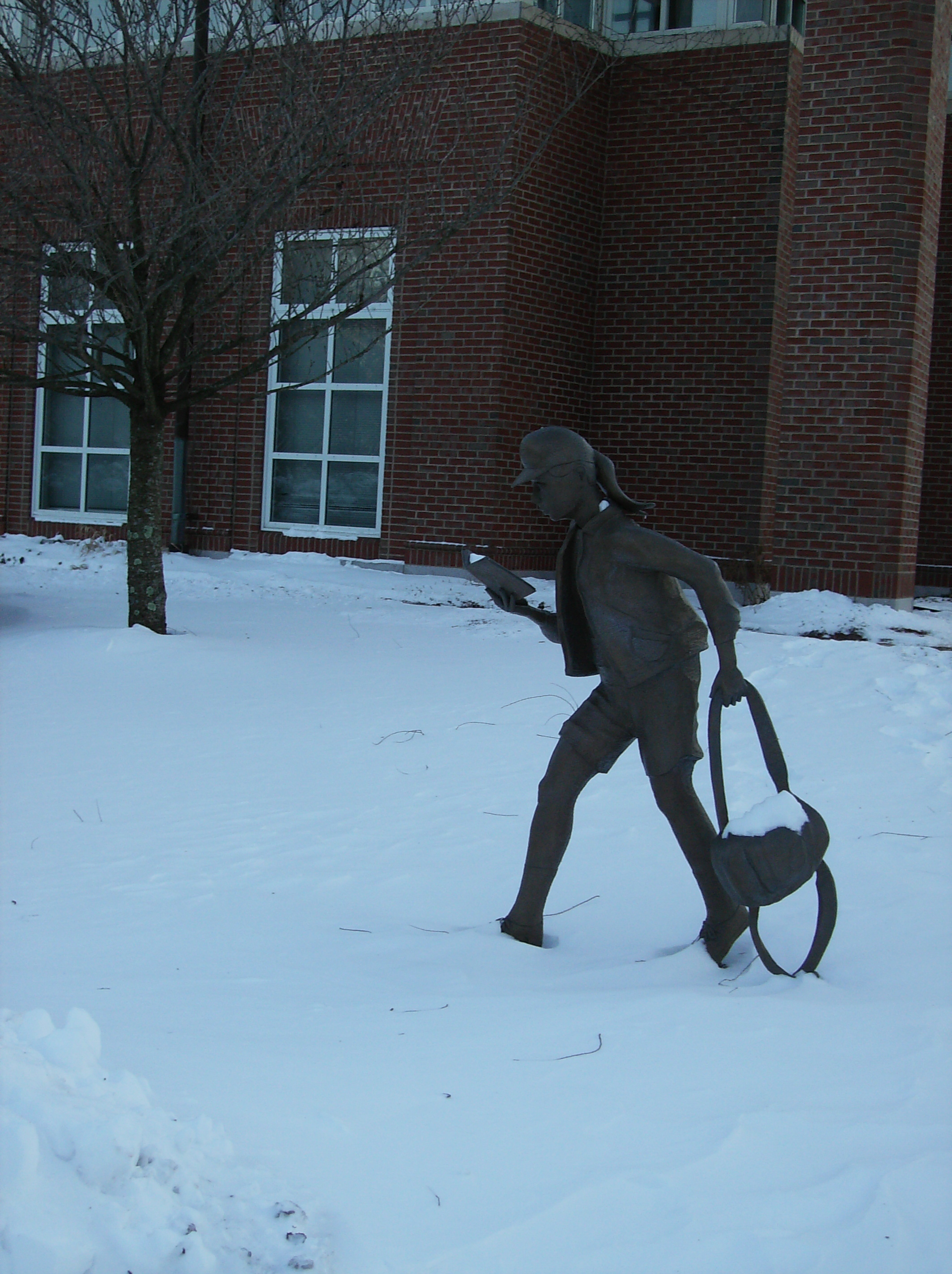
Statue of a young girl outside of the Newton Free Library

Architectural features

- Style and Material: Neo-Georgian architecture made of brick and stone
- Layout: Three floors, all above ground
- Square Footage: 91,405 square feet (8,491.8 m^{2})
- Lot size: 4.588 acres (18,570 m^{2})
- Height of Atrium: 50' to bottom of skylight
- Cost: $15,300,000
- Dedicated: September 15, 1991

Circulation

- The Newton Free Library loans out more items than any other library building in Massachusetts.
- In 1870, a total of 1,360 people had "registered their names" with the Newton Free Library.
- The first telephone for the library was installed in 1904.
- From 1905 to 1916 book deliveries between branches were carried out in a horse and buggy.
- In 1870, the largest number of items loaned in a single day was 250.
