= Richard Bond (architect) =

American architect

- Born: March 5, 1798; Conway, Massachusetts, U.S.
- Died: August 6, 1861 (aged 63); Roxbury, Massachusetts, U.S.
- Occupation: Architect

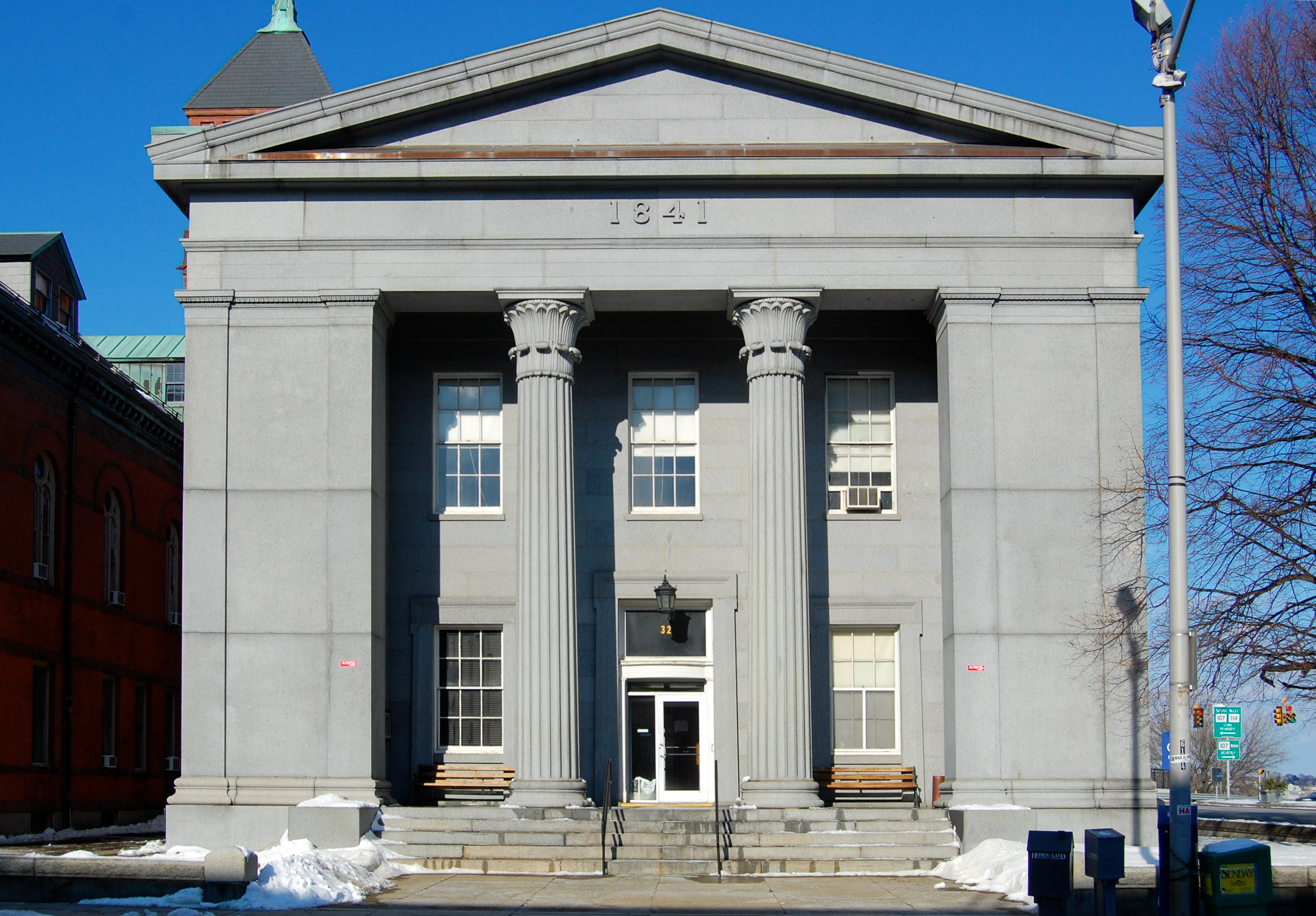
Essex County Courthouse in Salem, Massachusetts, built in 1839

Richard Bond (1798–1861) was an early American architect who practiced primarily in Boston, Massachusetts.

== Life and career ==
Richard Bond, son of a farmer, was born March 5, 1798, in Conway, Massachusetts. He was drawn to the study of architecture by the construction of the First Parish Church in nearby Northampton, which was completed in 1812 and designed by Asher Benjamin. As a young adult, Bond moved to Boston and established himself as a carpenter.

Bond is known to have been working as an architect-builder beginning in the mid-1820s, later crossing over into pure architecture. In 1833 he became the partner of Isaiah Rogers and formed Rogers & Bond. The firm lasted only until the following year, when Rogers left Boston to reestablish his office in New York City. Bond worked alone until 1850, when he made architect Charles Edward Parker a partner. Bond & Parker lasted until 1853, when both resumed his independent practice. Bond continued his practice alone until his death.

Bond was one of the architects who met in 1836 in New York's Astor House (designed by Rogers) to form the American Institute of Architects.

Bond died at his home in Roxbury on August 6, 1861. He was survived by his wife, and he left his architectural reference library of 61 books to the library of Amherst College.

Noted architect Alexander Rice Esty worked for Bond during the 1840s.

== Works ==
=== Richard Bond, before 1833 ===
- 1826 - Green Street Church, 32-36 Green St (New Chardon St), Boston, Massachusetts
  - Later converted into a factory, and demolished.
- 1829 - Mariner's Church, 43-47 Purchase St, Boston, Massachusetts
  - Also became a factory, and demolished.
- 1831 - First Parish Church, 19 Town Sq, Plymouth, Massachusetts
  - From an elevation by George W. Brimmer, a gentleman architect. Demolished.

=== Rogers & Bond, 1833-1834 ===
- 1833 - First Parish Church, 1446 Massachusetts Ave, Cambridge, Massachusetts

=== Richard Bond, 1834-1850 ===
- 1835 - Merchants' Exchange, 169 Middle Street, Portland, Maine
  - Burned in 1854.
- 1836 - Lewis Wharf, 28-32 Atlantic Ave, Boston, Massachusetts
- 1836 - North Congregational Church, Purchase & Elm Sts, New Bedford, Massachusetts
  - Demolished.
- 1836 - North Parish Church, 190 Academy Rd, North Andover, Massachusetts
- 1837 - Salem City Hall, 93 Washington St, Salem, Massachusetts
- 1838 - Gore Hall, Harvard University, Cambridge, Massachusetts
  - Demolished.
- 1839 - Essex County Courthouse, 34 Federal St, Salem, Massachusetts
- 1840 - Bowdoin Square Baptist Church, Cambridge & New Chardon Sts, Boston, Massachusetts
  - Demolished.
- 1841 - Brighton Town Hall, 321 Washington St, Brighton, Massachusetts
  - Brighton has been part of Boston since 1874. Burned 1977.
- 1841 - Central Congregational Church, 27 Winter St, Boston, Massachusetts
  - Demolished. Part of the building remains facing Hamilton Place.
- 1841 - St. John's Episcopal Church, 27 Devens St, Charlestown, Massachusetts
- 1842 - First Congregational Church, 106 N Main St, Oberlin, Ohio
  - The built structure only loosely followed Bond's plans.
- 1842 - St. John's R. C. Church, 4th & Otis Sts, Cambridge, Massachusetts
  - Demolished.
- 1843 - Mount Vernon Church, 11 Ashburton Pl, Boston, Massachusetts
  - Later Boston University's Isaac Rich Hall. Demolished.
- 1844 - Boston Latin School, Bedford St near Chauncy, Boston, Massachusetts
  - Demolished.
- 1844 - Horticultural Hall, 40 School St, Boston, Massachusetts
  - Demolished.
- 1846 - St. John's R. C. Church, 44 Temple St, Worcester, Massachusetts
- 1847 - Lawrence Hall, Harvard University, Cambridge, Massachusetts
  - Demolished.
- 1848 - First Church, 10 Church St, Bradford, Massachusetts
- 1848 - South Congregational Church, 110 South St, Pittsfield, Massachusetts
- 1849 - Mrs. John W. Candler House, 447 Washington St, Brookline, Massachusetts

=== Bond & Parker, 1850-1853 ===
- 1850 - Bank of Commerce Building, 83 State St, Boston, Massachusetts
  - Demolished.
- 1851 - Concord Town House, 22 Monument Sq, Concord, Massachusetts
- 1851 - Tremont Bank Building, 41-43 State St, Boston, Massachusetts
  - Demolished.

=== Richard Bond, from 1853 ===
- 1854 - Tabernacle Congregational Church, 50 Washington St, Salem, Massachusetts
  - Demolished.
- 1855 - Brattleboro Town Hall, 181-183 Main St, Brattleboro, Vermont
  - Demolished.
- 1856 - First Parish Church, 630 Massachusetts Ave, Arlington, Massachusetts
  - Burned.
- 1856 - Free Street Baptist Church (Remodeling), 142 Free St, Portland, Maine
  - Remodeled back to its original appearance in 1926 by J. C. & J. H. Stevens, as the Chamber of Commerce.

== Gallery ==
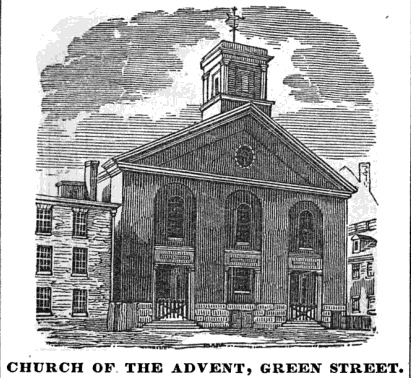
Green Street Church, Boston, 1826

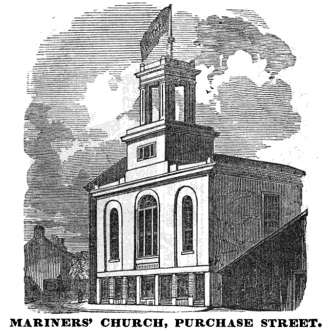
Mariners' Church, Boston, 1829

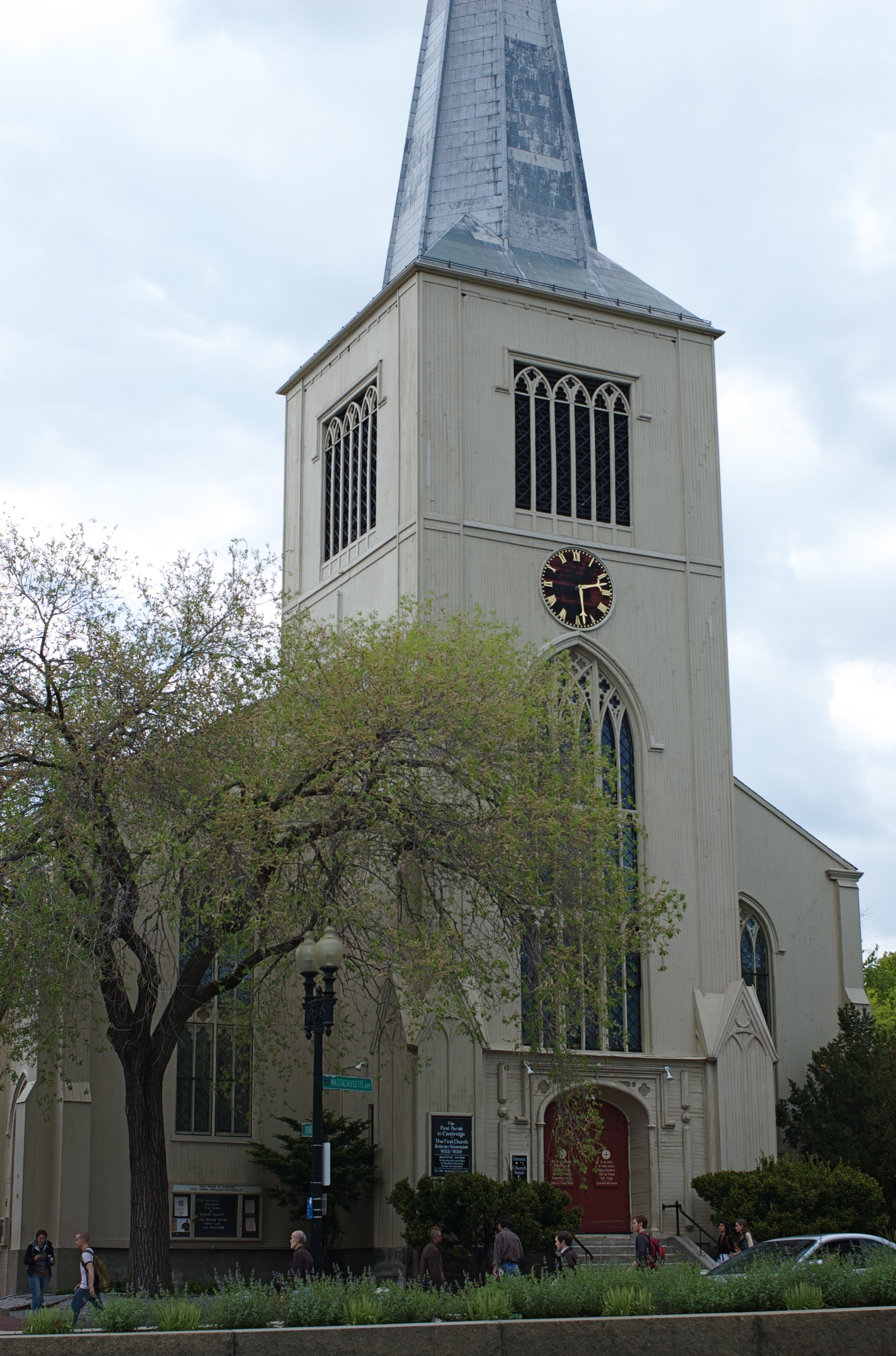
First Parish Church, Cambridge, 1833

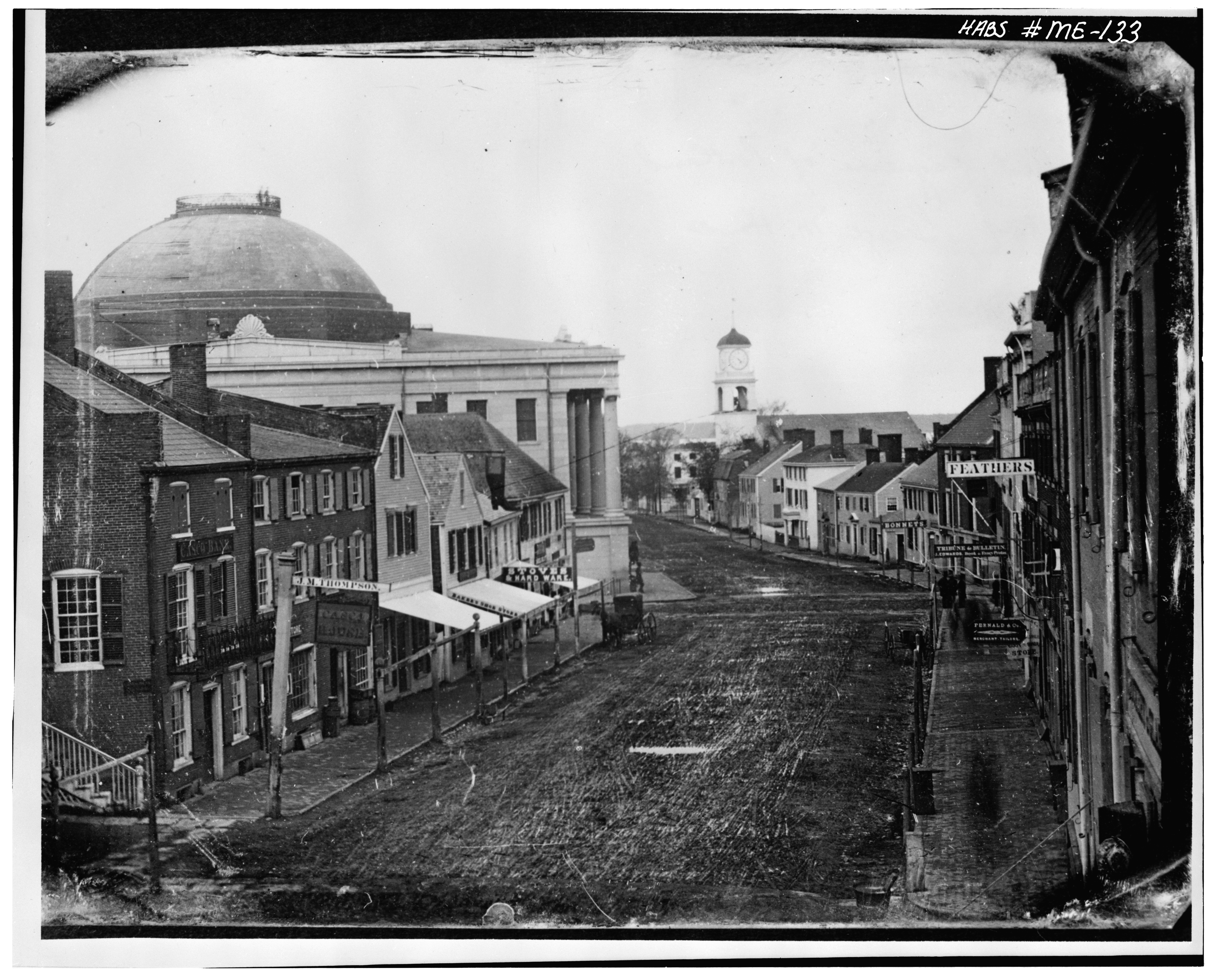
Merchants' Exchange, Portland, 1835

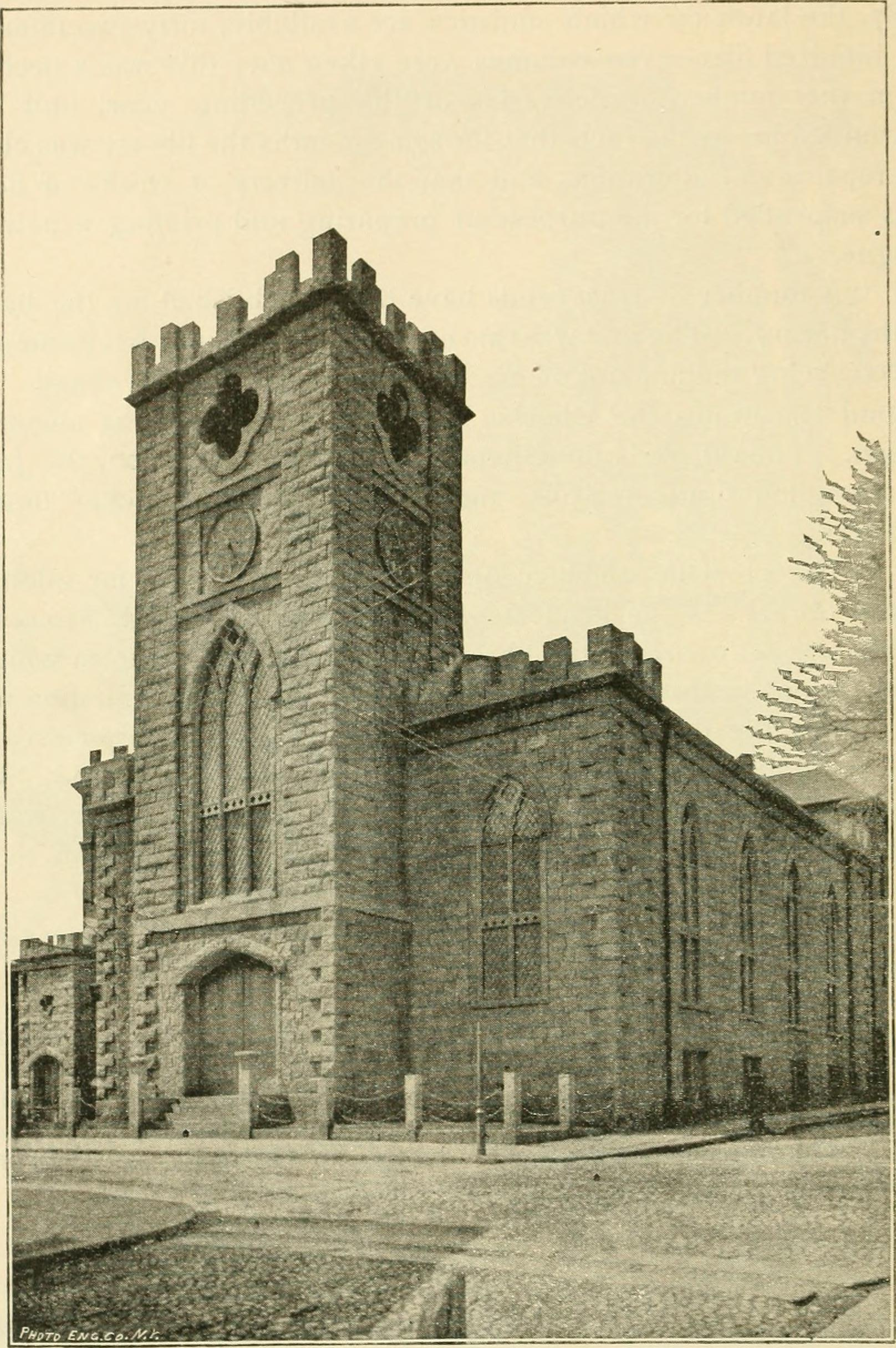
North Congregational Church, New Bedford, 1836

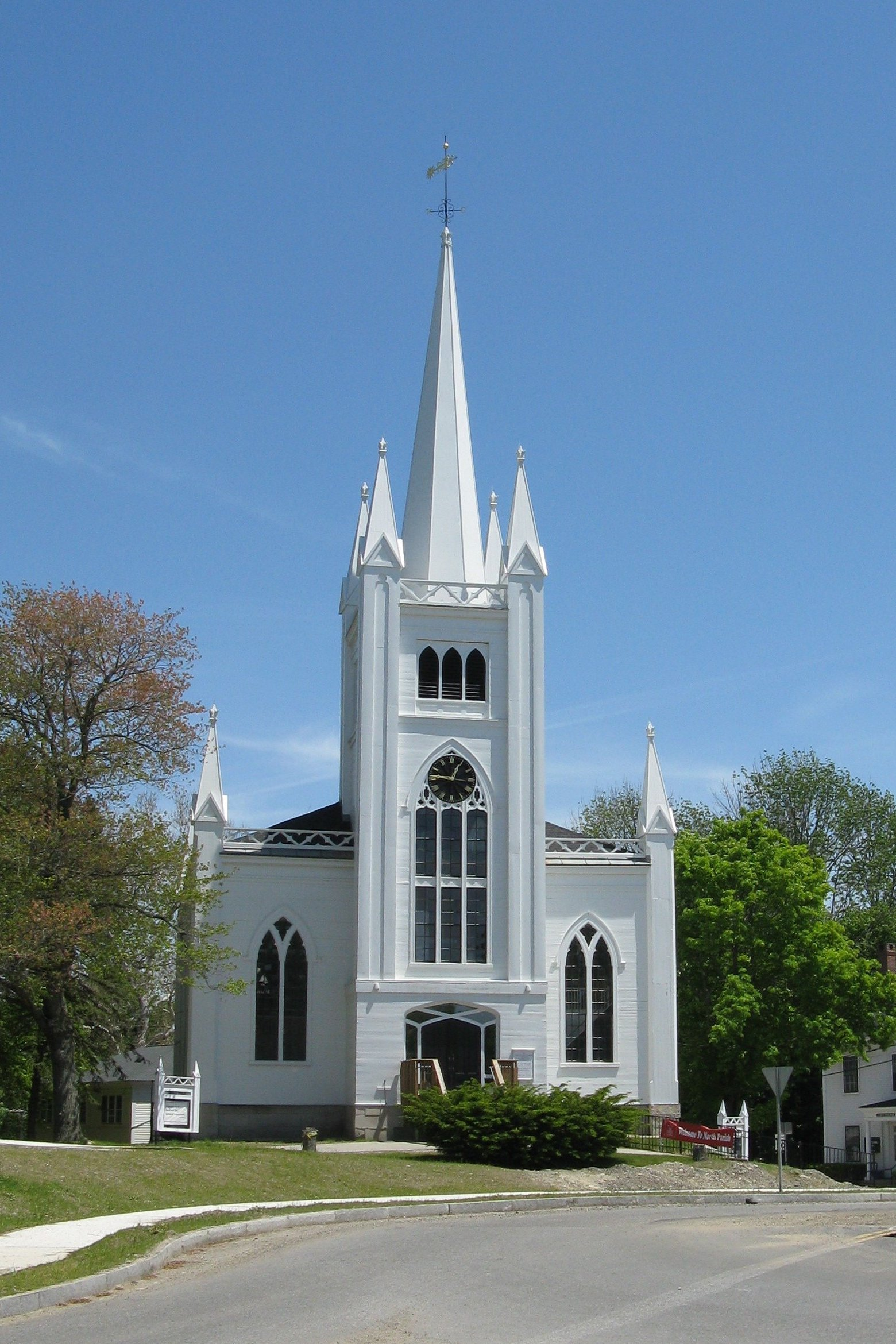
North Parish Church, North Andover, 1836

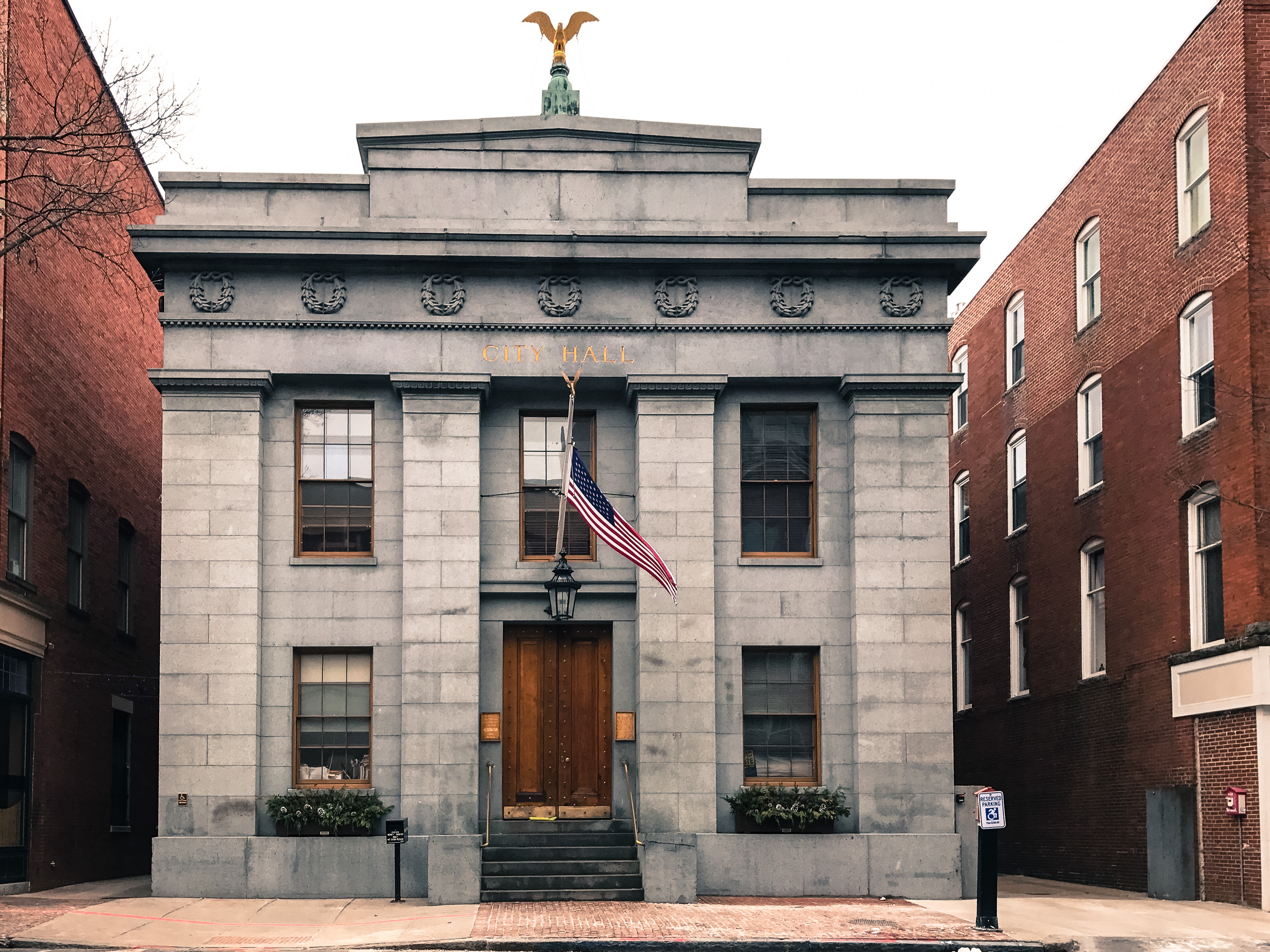
Salem City Hall, Salem, 1837

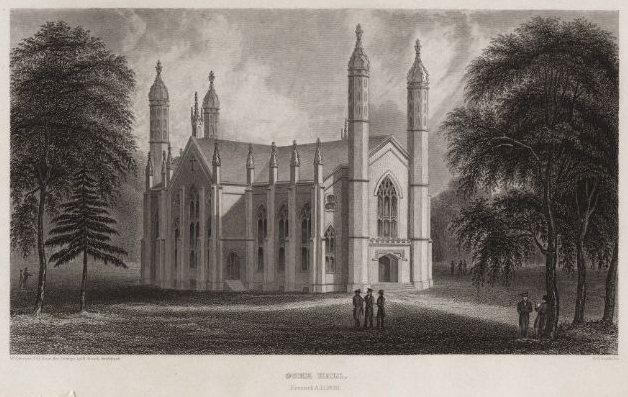
Gore Hall, Harvard University, 1838.

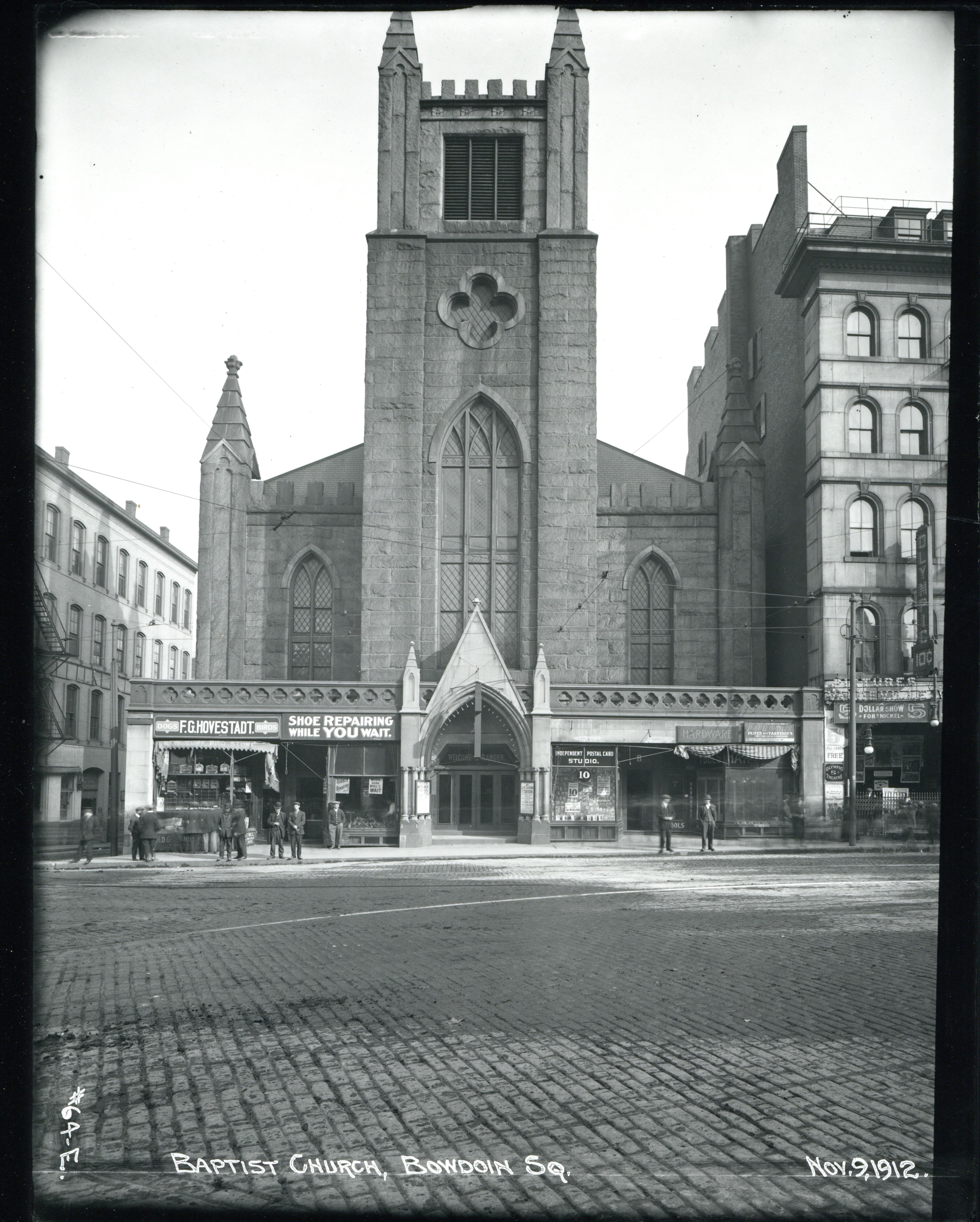
Bowdoin Square Baptist Church, Boston, 1840.

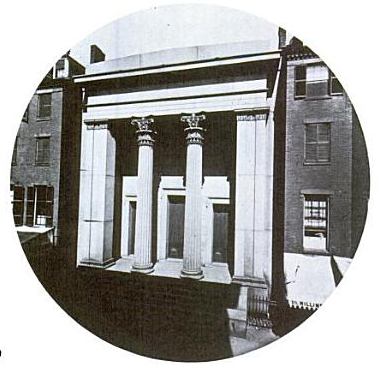
Central Congregational Church, Boston, 1841

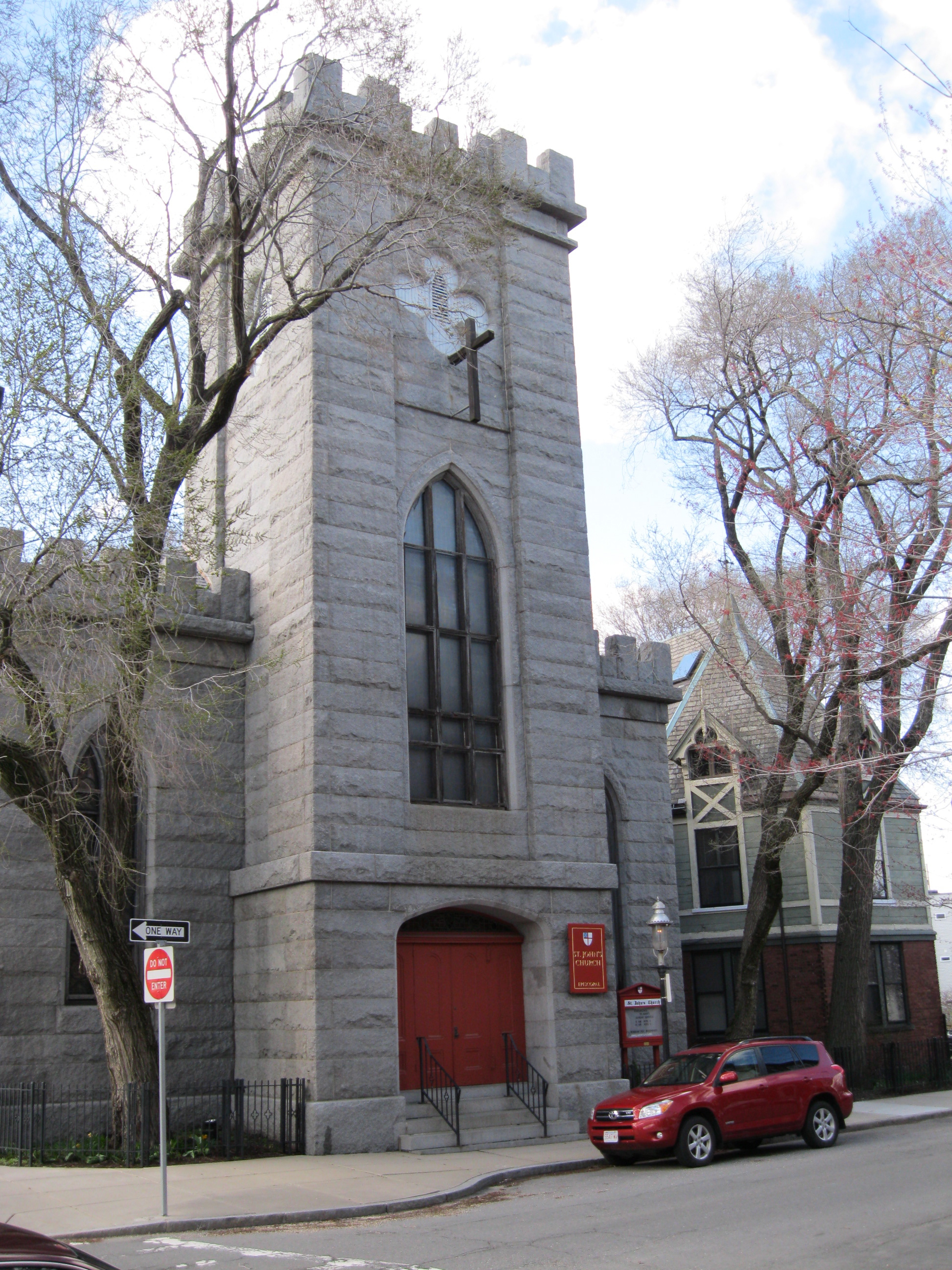
St. John's Church, Charlestown, 1841

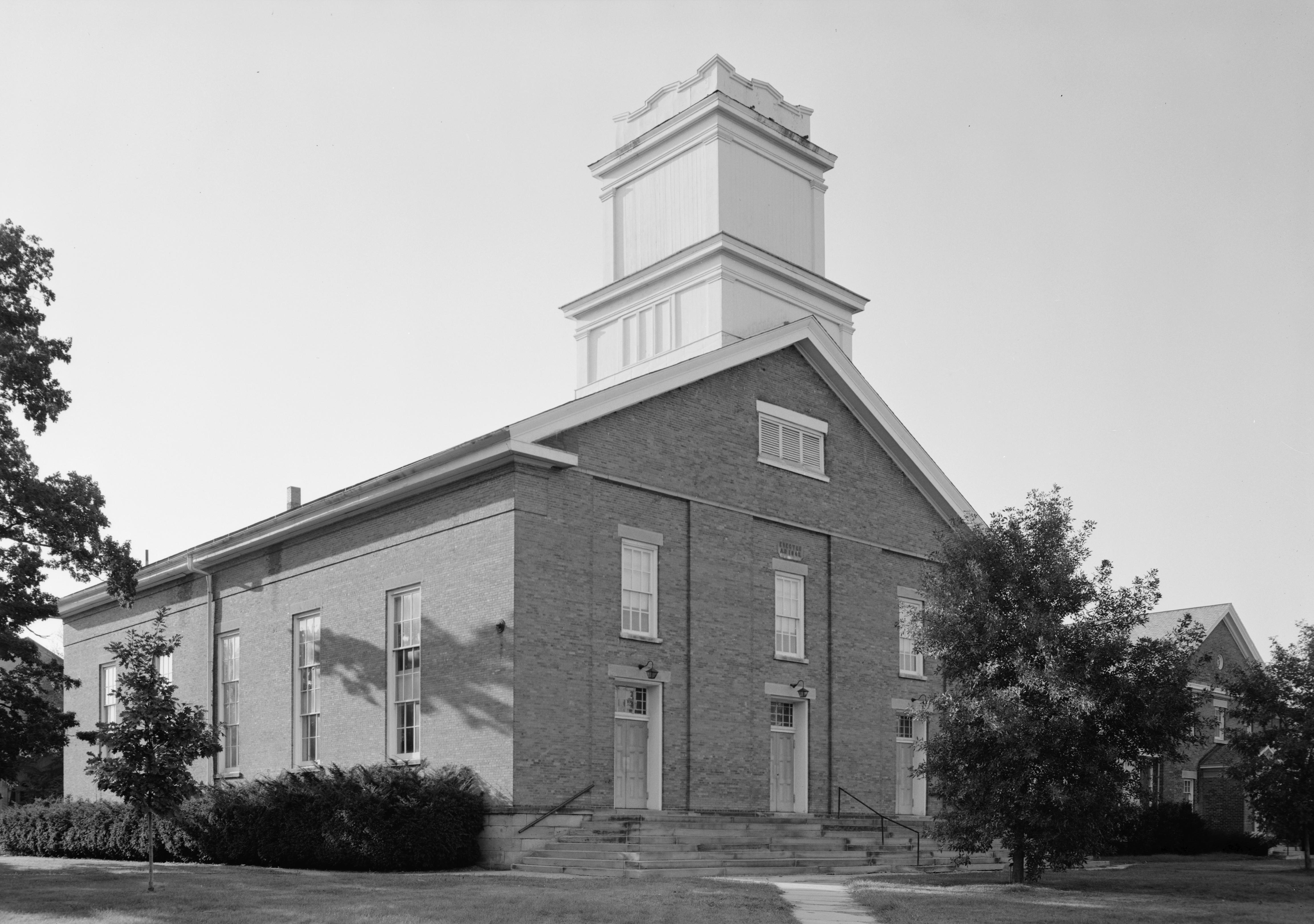
First Congregational Church, Oberlin, 1842

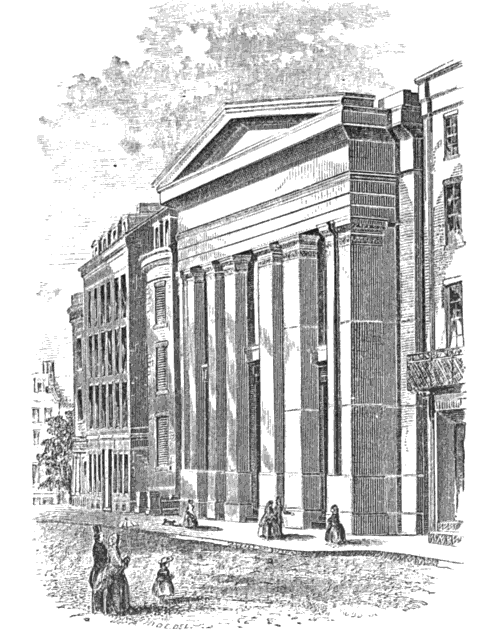
Mount Vernon Church, Boston, 1843

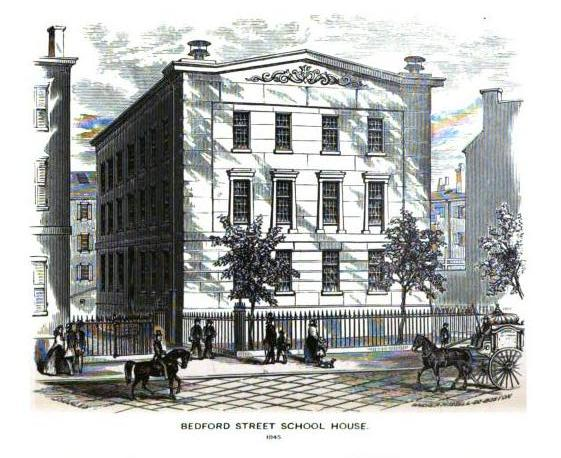
Boston Latin School, Boston, 1844

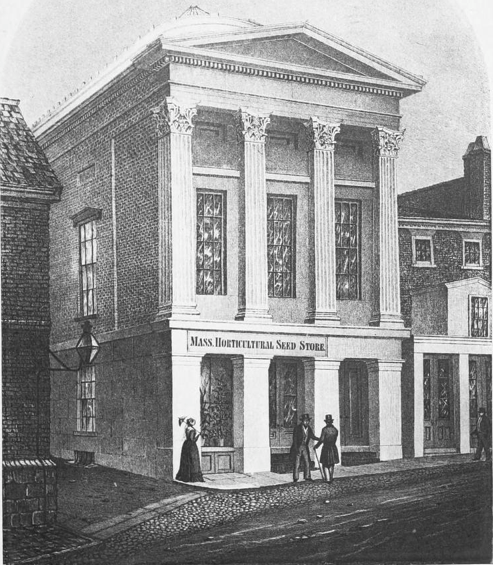
Horticultural Hall, Boston, 1844

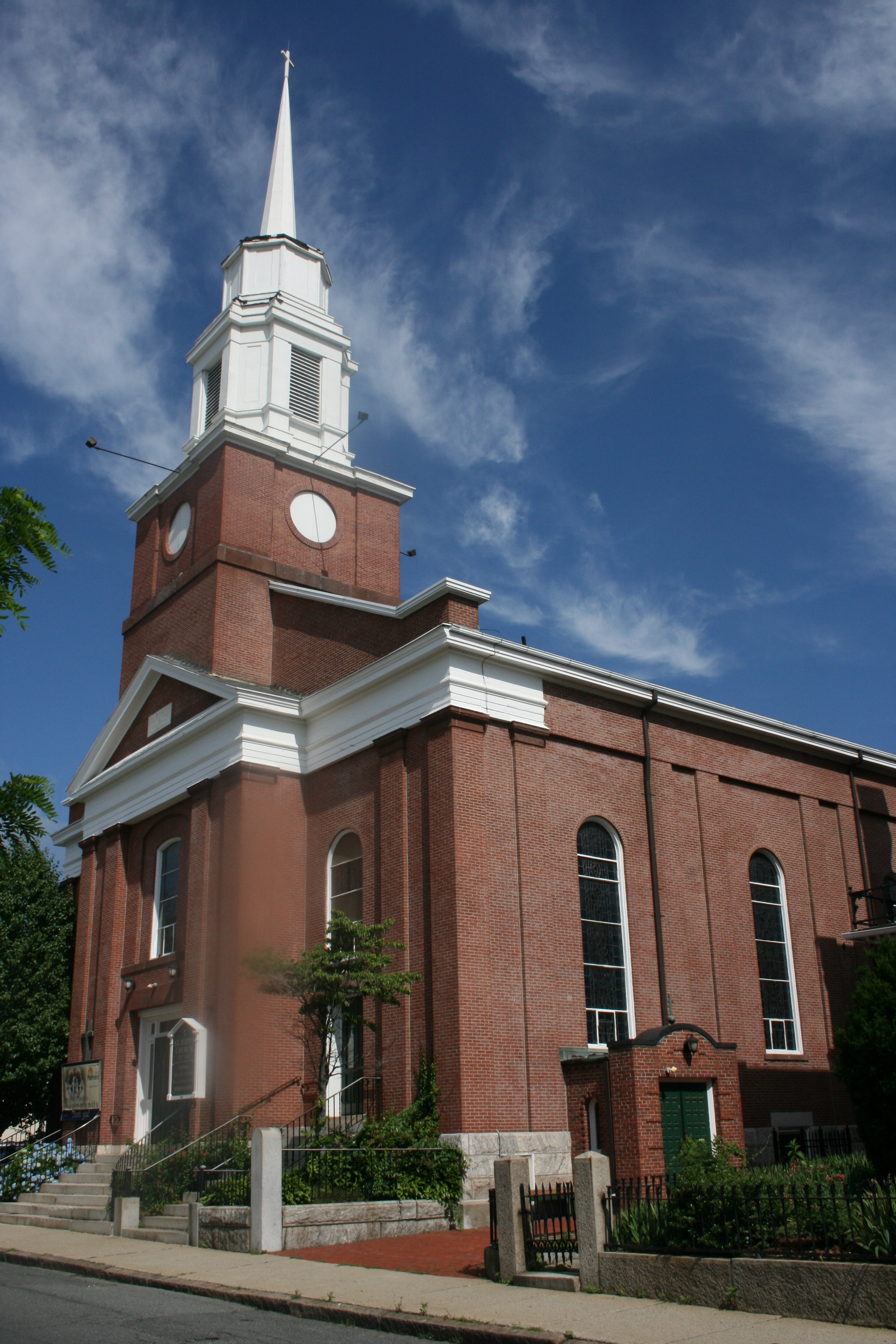
St. John's R. C. Church, Worcester, 1846

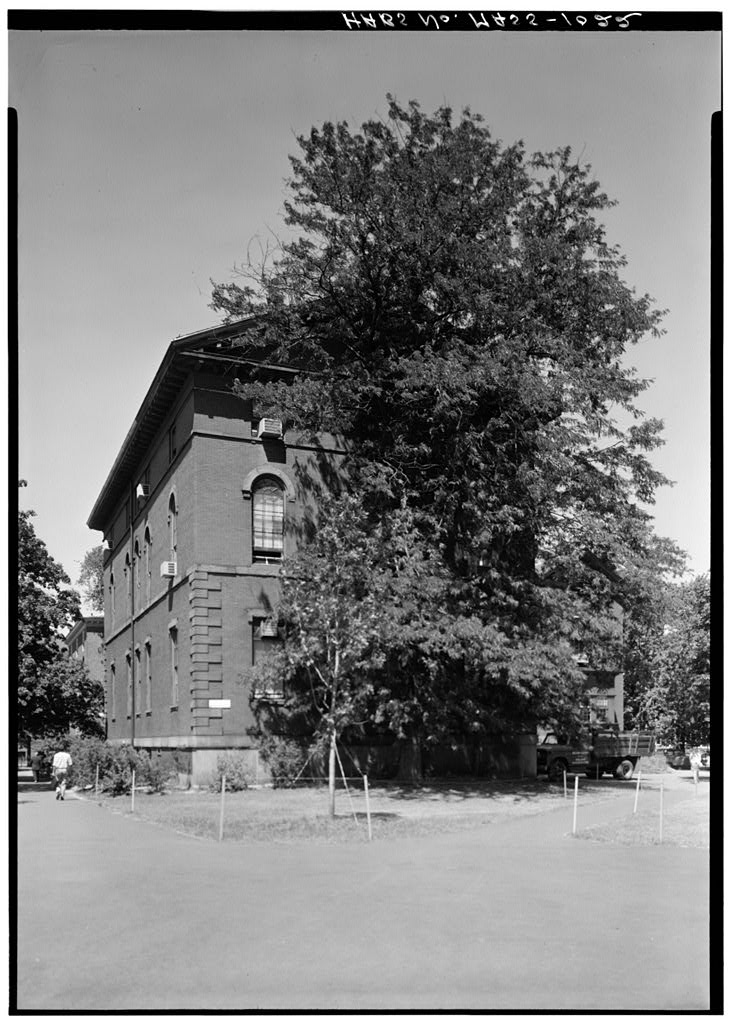
Lawrence Hall, Harvard University, 1847

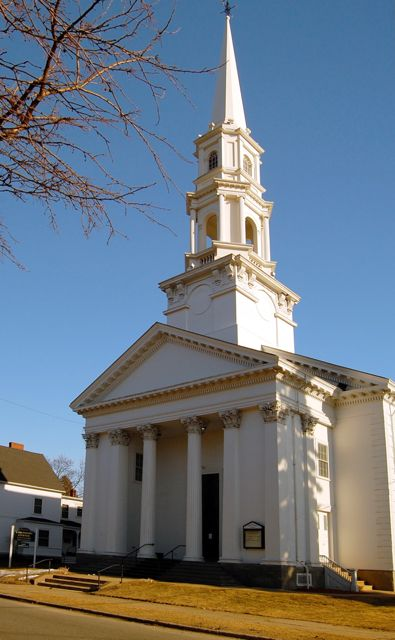
First Church, Bradford, 1848

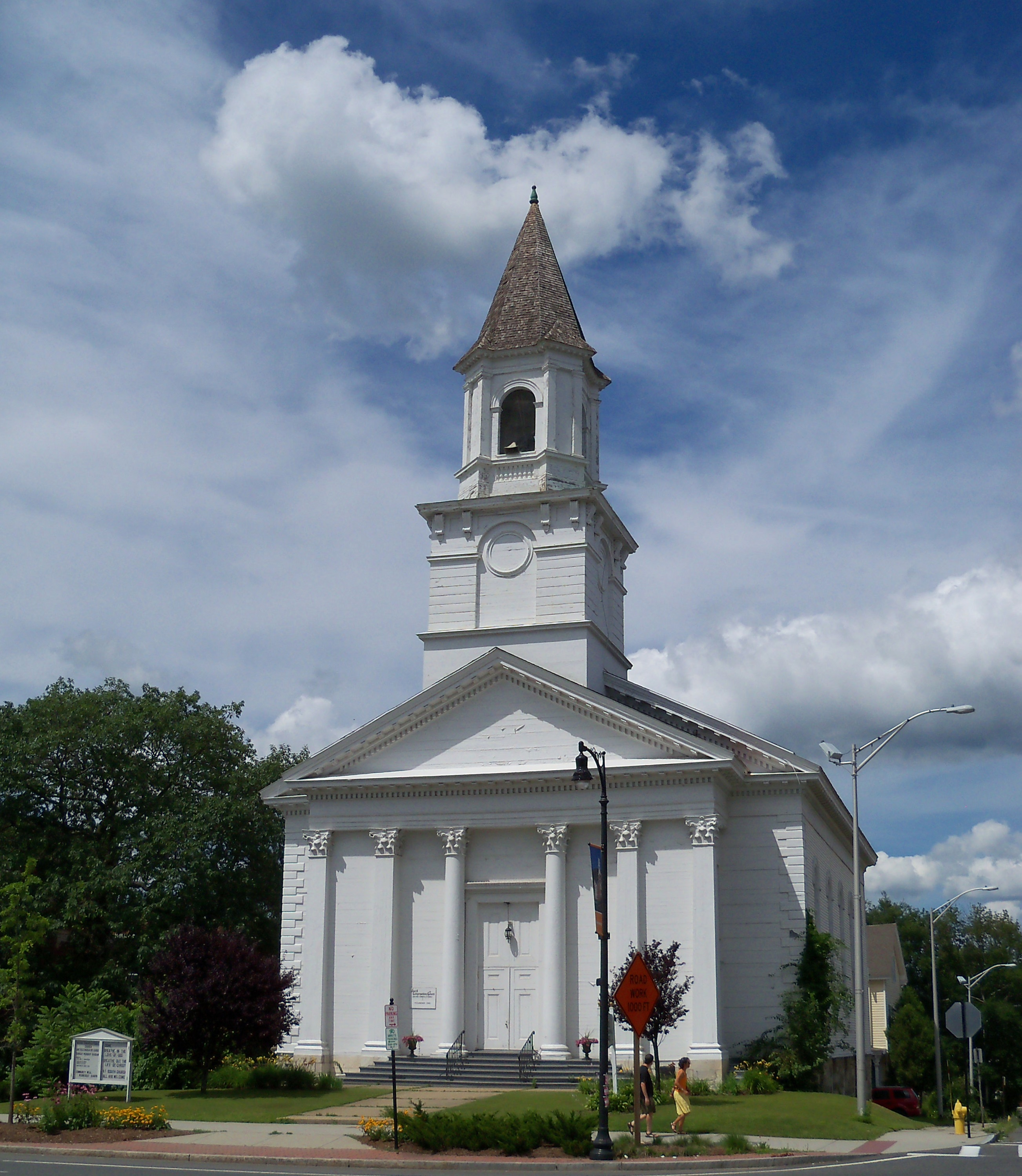
South Church, Pittsfield, 1848

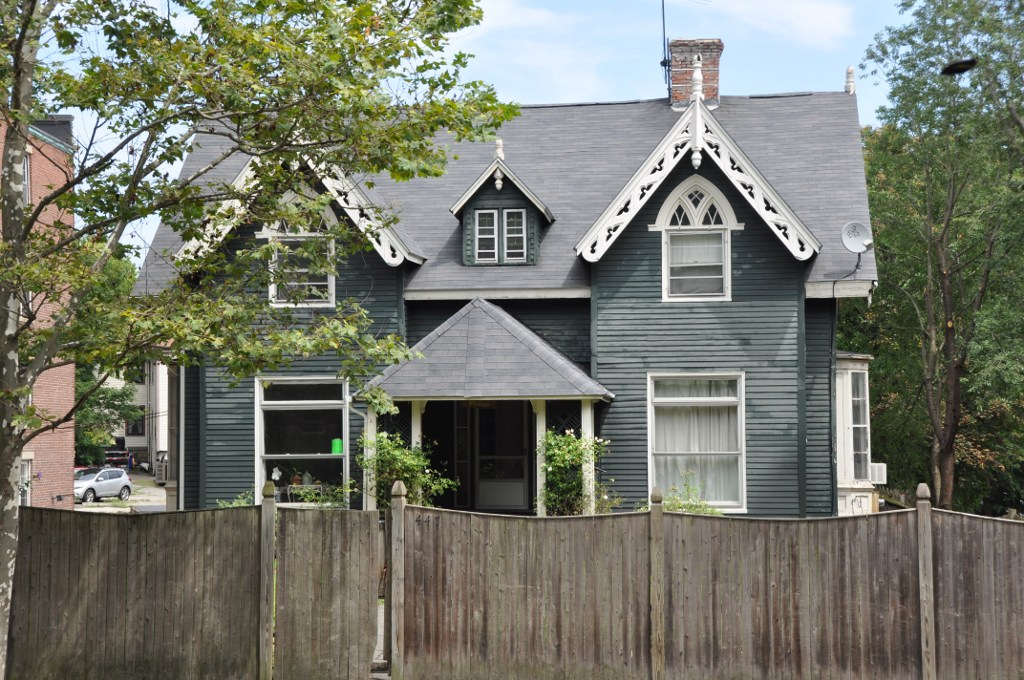
Mrs. J. W. Candler House, Brookline, 1849

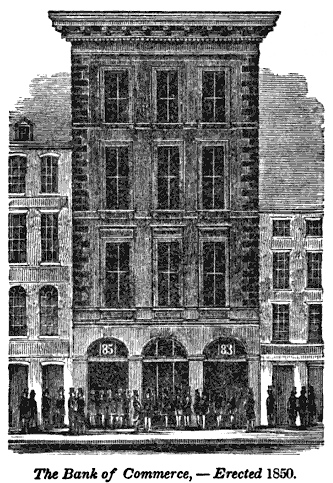
Bank of Commerce Building, Boston, 1850

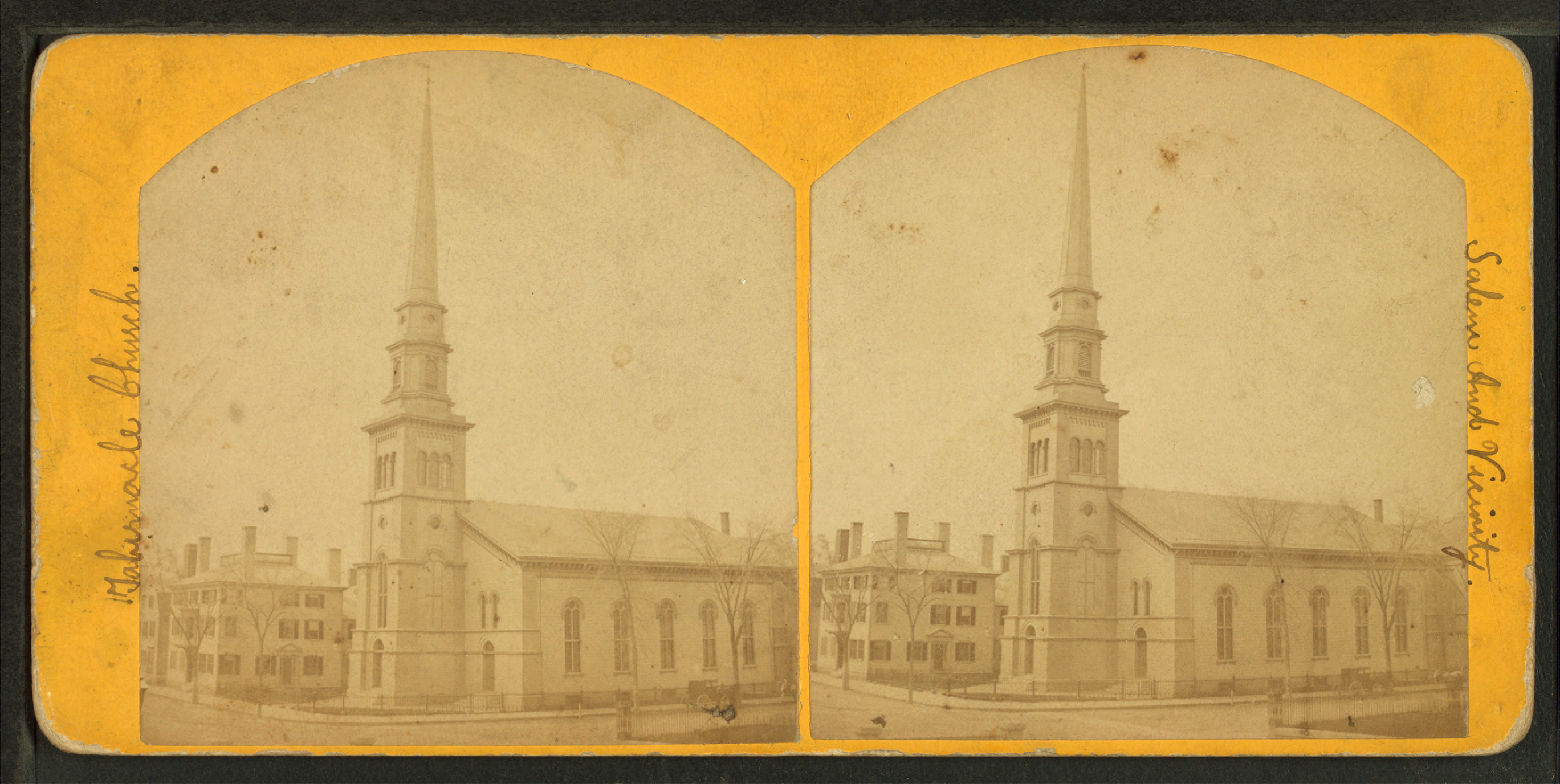
Tabernacle Congregational Church, Salem, 1854
