= Downtown Salem District =

Historic district in Massachusetts, United States

- U.S. National Register of Historic Places
- U.S. Historic district
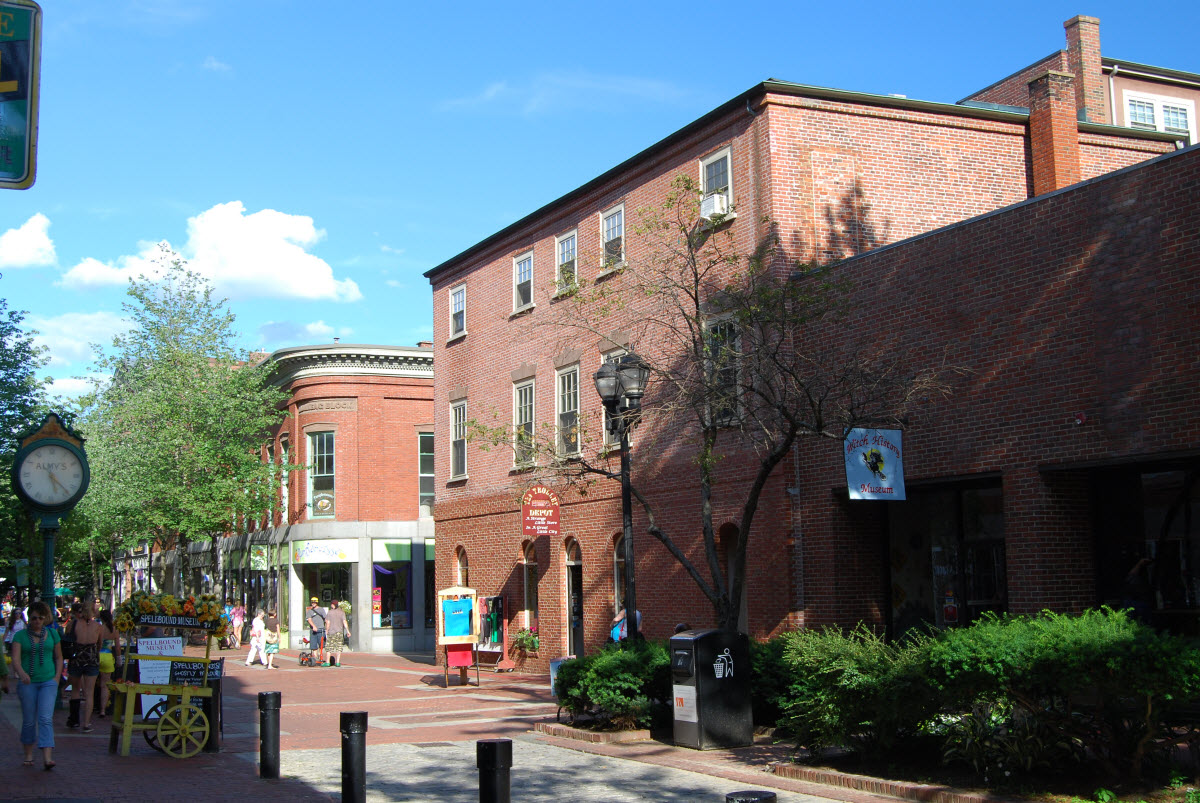
- Essex Street

- Location within Massachusetts Location within the United States
- Location: Salem, Massachusetts
- Coordinates: 42°31′16″N 70°53′45″W
- Architect: Multiple
- Architectural style: Late 19th And 20th Century Revivals, Late Victorian
- NRHP reference No.: 72000149 (original); 83003969 (increase)

Significant dates
- Added to NRHP: December 4, 1972
- Boundary increase: October 18, 1983

Downtown Salem District is a historic district roughly bounded by Church, Central, New Derby, and Washington Streets in Salem, Massachusetts. It was added to the National Register of Historic Places in 1983, and represents a major expansion of the Old Town Hall Historic District, which was listed in 1972.

When first listed in 1972, the district consisted of a cluster of buildings around Salem's Old Town Hall on Derby Square and Essex, Washington, and Front Streets. The Essex Street pedestrian Mall was closed off to vehicular traffic in 1976 and was made open only to pedestrians and delivery vehicles. The 1983 expansion significantly enlarged the district to encompass a significant portion of Salem's historic downtown. It includes two properties previously listed individually on the National Register: the Joshua Ward House, and City Hall, both on Washington Street.

== Joshua Ward House ==
The Joshua Ward House is a historic house at 148 Washington Street, built in 1784. It was added separately to the National Register of Historic Places in 1978.

== Salem City Hall ==
Salem City Hall, the oldest continually run city hall in America, opened in 1837 and is located at 93 Washington Street in Salem. Constructed in the style of Greek Revival, it was added separately to the National Register of Historic Places in 1973. It notably survived the Great Salem Fire of 1914.

== Salem Old Town Hall ==
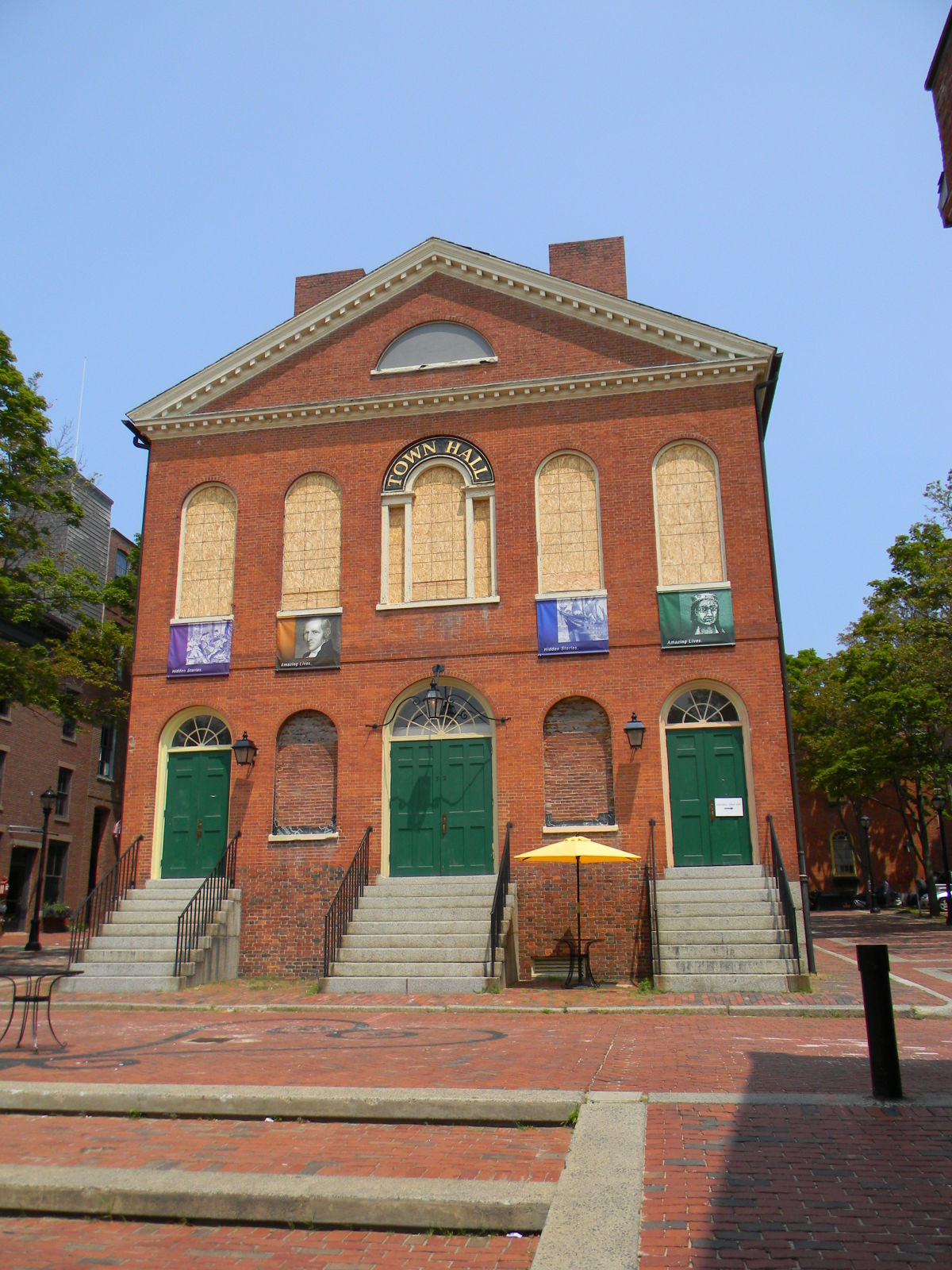
Old Town Hall, 2015

Old Town Hall is the earliest surviving municipal structure in Salem (dating from 1816–17) and is an outstanding example of Federal architecture. The second floor of the building, Great Hall, has always been used as a public hall, and contained town offices until 1837. The first floor, originally designed as a public market, now houses the Salem Museum.

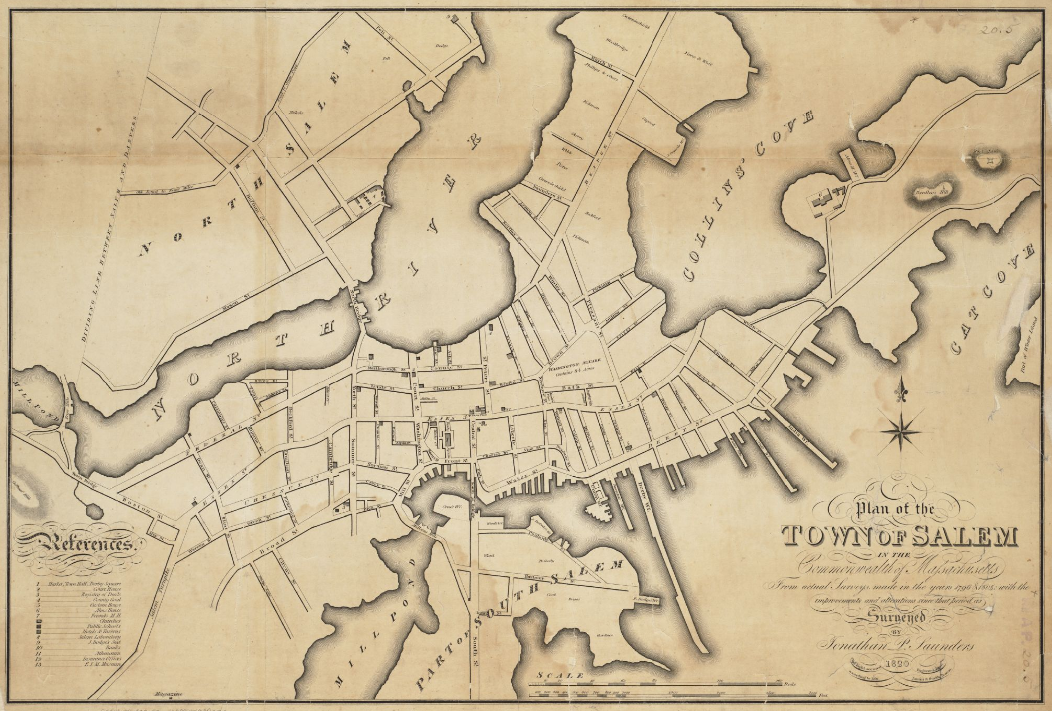
Salem - 1820

The building and its Derby Square site maintain historical associations with Salem's prominent 18th and 19th century Derby family for whom Derby Square, Derby Wharf, Derby Street and the two Derby houses on the Salem waterfront were named. The building contains elements attributed to both Charles Bulfinch, the most influential Boston architect of the Federal period, and Samuel McIntire, Salem's renowned architect and woodcarver. The structure was saved from demolition by Salem preservation architect Philip Horton Smith in the 1930s, and underwent a partial restoration in the 1970s.

History Alive!, the professional acting branch of the Gordon College Department of Theatre, sometimes performs at Old Town Hall.

== See also ==
- National Register of Historic Places listings in Salem, Massachusetts
- National Register of Historic Places listings in Essex County, Massachusetts
