= Congregational Church of Christ =

Historic church in Ohio, United States

- U.S. National Register of Historic Places
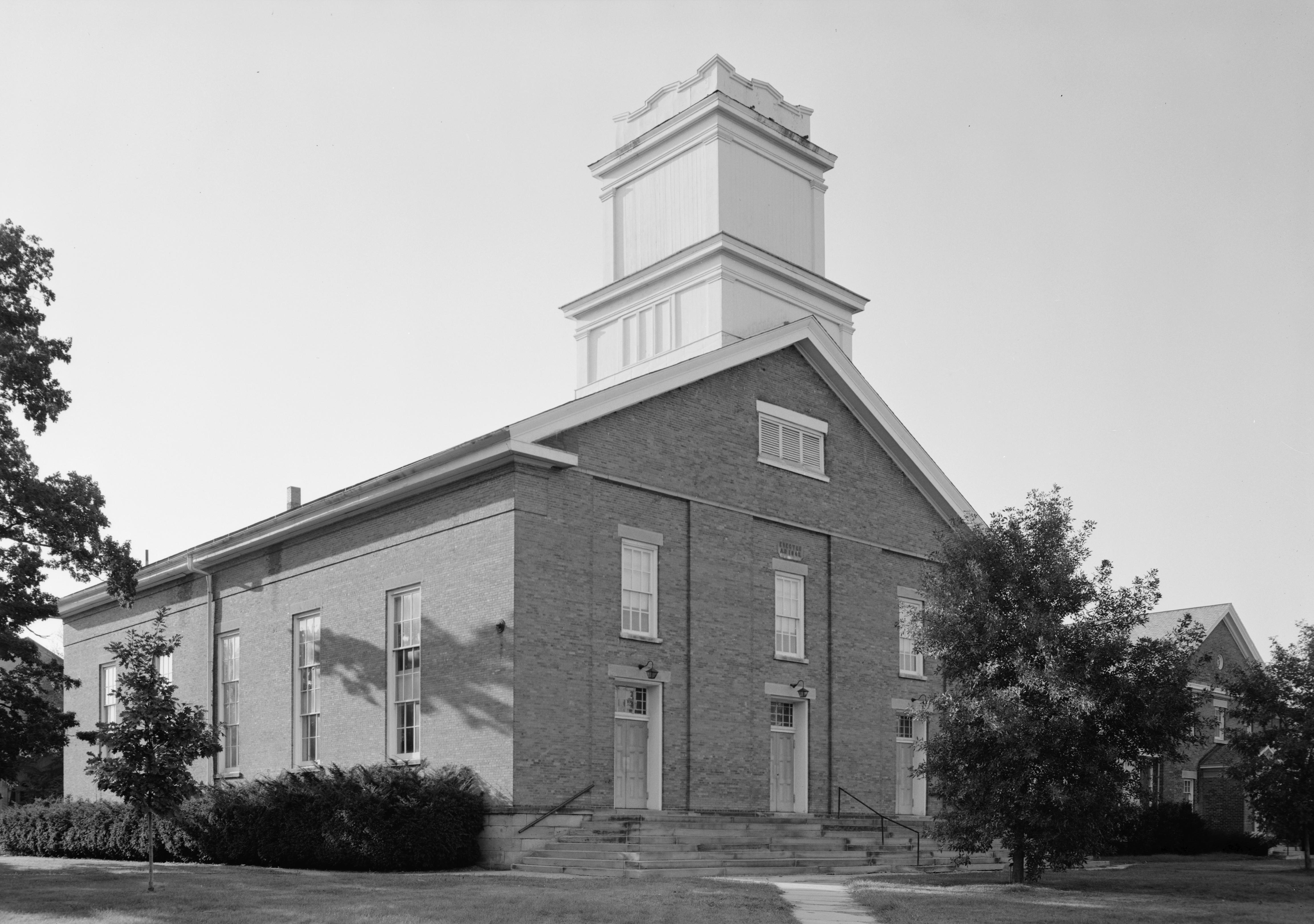

- Location within Ohio Location within the United States
- Location: W. Lorain and N. Main Sts., Oberlin, Ohio
- Coordinates: 41°17′40″N 82°13′6″W
- Area: less than one acre
- Built: 1842
- Architectural style: Greek Revival
- NRHP reference No.: 74001554
- Added to NRHP: August 13, 1974

Congregational Church of Christ (also known as Congregational Church of Christ at Oberlin or First Church) is a historic church at W. Lorain and N. Main Streets in Oberlin, Ohio. Currently the church is occupied by a United Church of Christ congregation. Richard Bond (architect) did drawing for the church.

The church was built in 1842. For 37 years it was led by prominent abolitionist Charles Grandison Finney, who was also president of Oberlin College. Other abolitionists such as Frederick Douglass and Ralph Waldo Emerson led meetings here. Prominent speakers have included Rev. Dr. Martin Luther King, Booker T. Washington, Mark Twain and President Woodrow Wilson. The Congregational Church of Christ was added to the National Register of Historic Places in 1974.
