= Charles Edward Parker =

American architect (1826–1890)

- Born: 1826; Keene, New Hampshire
- Died: 1890 (aged 63–64); Auburndale, Massachusetts
- Occupation: Architect
- Practice: C. E. Parker; Bond & Parker

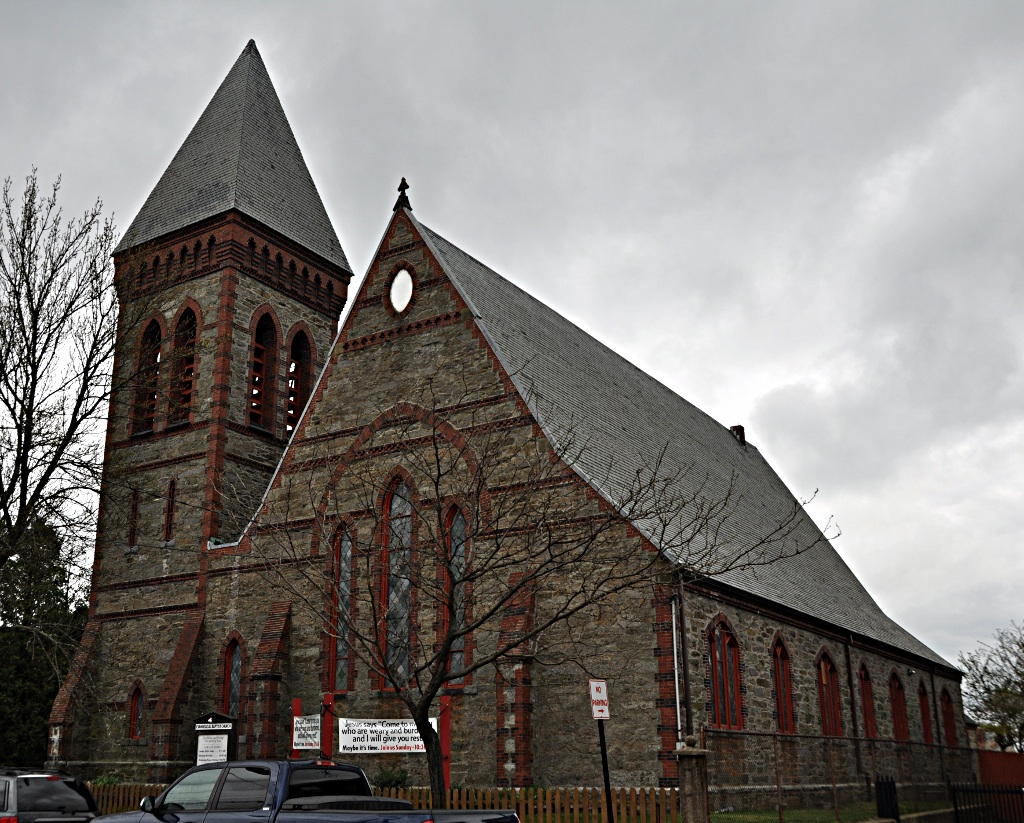
Evangelical Baptist Church, Newton, 1873.

Charles Edward Parker (1826–1890) was an American architect from Boston, Massachusetts.

== Life and career ==
After growing up in Keene, New Hampshire, Parker moved to Boston in the 1840s, where he worked for architect Gridley J. F. Bryant. Around 1846, at the young age of 20, he established his own office. After several years of private practice, he joined the office of prominent architect Richard Bond as junior partner. The firm, Bond & Parker, existed from 1850 until 1853. He practiced alone for the rest of his career. He retired from active practice soon before his death in late 1890.

Parker was the father of the noted composer Horatio Parker, born in Auburndale in 1863. Parker's Hora Novissima, written in 1893 after his father's death, was dedicated to him. Of the influence of the father on the son, it was said that from him, "[Horatio] inherited an artistic nature and creative faculty", though his primary artistic inspiration came from his mother.

== Legacy ==
Parker designed the Easthampton Town Hall and the Chicopee City Hall, as well as at least nine churches. Several of these, plus the City Hall in Chicopee, have been listed on the National Register of Historic Places for their architectural significance.

== Architectural works ==
Year	Building	Address	City	State	Notes	Image	Reference
1847	Brookline Reservoir Gatehouse	7 Warren St	Brookline	Massachusetts			
1848	Keene Town (City) Hall	11 Washington St	Keene	New Hampshire	Has been highly altered.		
1848	Gideon F. T. Reed House	35 Elm St	Canton	Massachusetts			
1850	Bank of Commerce Building	83 State St	Boston	Massachusetts	With Richard Bond. Demolished.		
1851	Concord Town House	22 Monument Sq	Concord	Massachusetts	With Richard Bond.		
1851	Isaac Davis Monument	Town Green	Acton	Massachusetts			
1851	Tremont Bank Building	41-43 State St	Boston	Massachusetts	With Richard Bond. Demolished.		
1853	J. B. Bradlee Building	50-52 Broad St	Boston	Massachusetts	Later known as the Architects' Building.		
1857	Auburndale Congregational Church	64 Hancock St	Auburndale	Massachusetts			
1857	Williston Hall	Amherst College	Amherst	Massachusetts	Radically rebuilt in 1951 to plans by McKim, Mead & White.		
1859	Barrett Hall	Amherst College	Amherst	Massachusetts			
1859	South Congregational Church	27 Pleasant St	Concord	New Hampshire			
1860	Eliot Church	474 Centre St	Newton	Massachusetts	Burned in 1887.		
1863	First Congregational Church	134 Main St	North Adams	Massachusetts			
1863	St. James Episcopal Church	44 West St	Keene	New Hampshire			
1864	Shawmut Congregational Church	143 W Brookline St	Boston	Massachusetts	Largely demolished, but parts of the building survive as part of the Taino Tower Condominiums.		
1867	Soldier's Monument	Old North Cemetery	Weymouth	Massachusetts			
1868	Bethany Congregational Church	115 Main St	Montpelier	Vermont	Due to structural deficiences, the sanctuary was replaced in 1959 to designs by Freeman French Freeman of Burlington.		
1869	Easthampton Town Hall	43 Main St	Easthampton	Massachusetts			
1868	Third Congregational Church	103 Springfield St	Chicopee	Massachusetts	Now Christ's Community Church.		
1871	Chicopee City Hall	17 Springfield St	Chicopee	Massachusetts			
1873	Evangelical Baptist Church	23 Chapel St	Nonantum	Massachusetts			
1875	Central Fire Station	44 Warren St	Concord	New Hampshire	Presently a facility of the local YMCA.		
1877	John Kimball House	10 N State St	Concord	New Hampshire	Highly altered.		
1881	Episcopal Church of the Messiah	1900 Commonwealth Ave	Auburndale	Massachusetts	Has been significantly rebuilt.		
