= City Hall (Chicopee, Massachusetts) =

- U.S. National Register of Historic Places
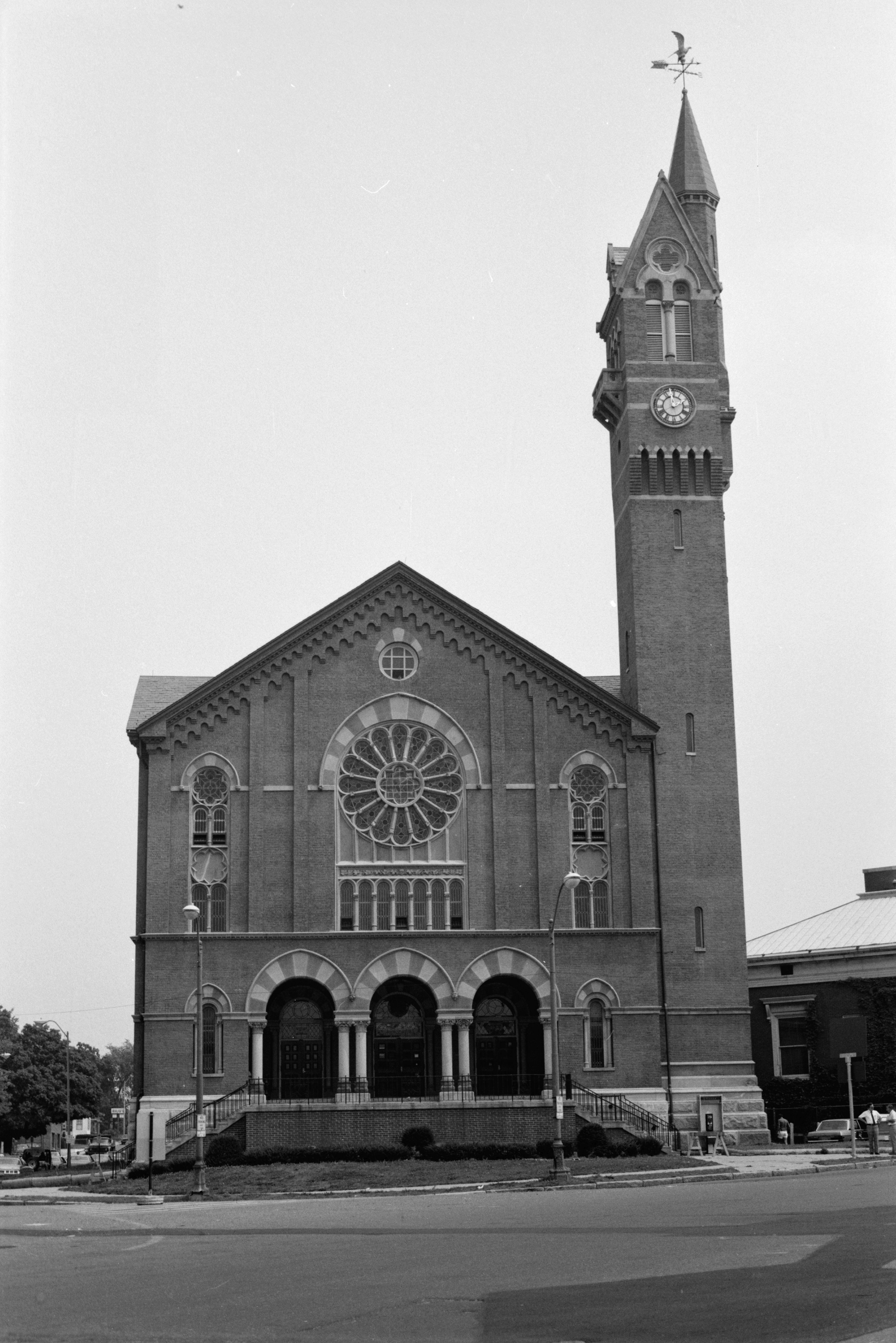
- City Hall in 1981

- Location within Massachusetts Location within the United States
- Location: Chicopee, Massachusetts
- Coordinates: 42°8′55″N 72°36′52″W
- Built: 1871
- Architect: Charles Edward Parker
- Architectural style: Romanesque
- NRHP reference No.: 74002052
- Added to NRHP: July 30, 1974

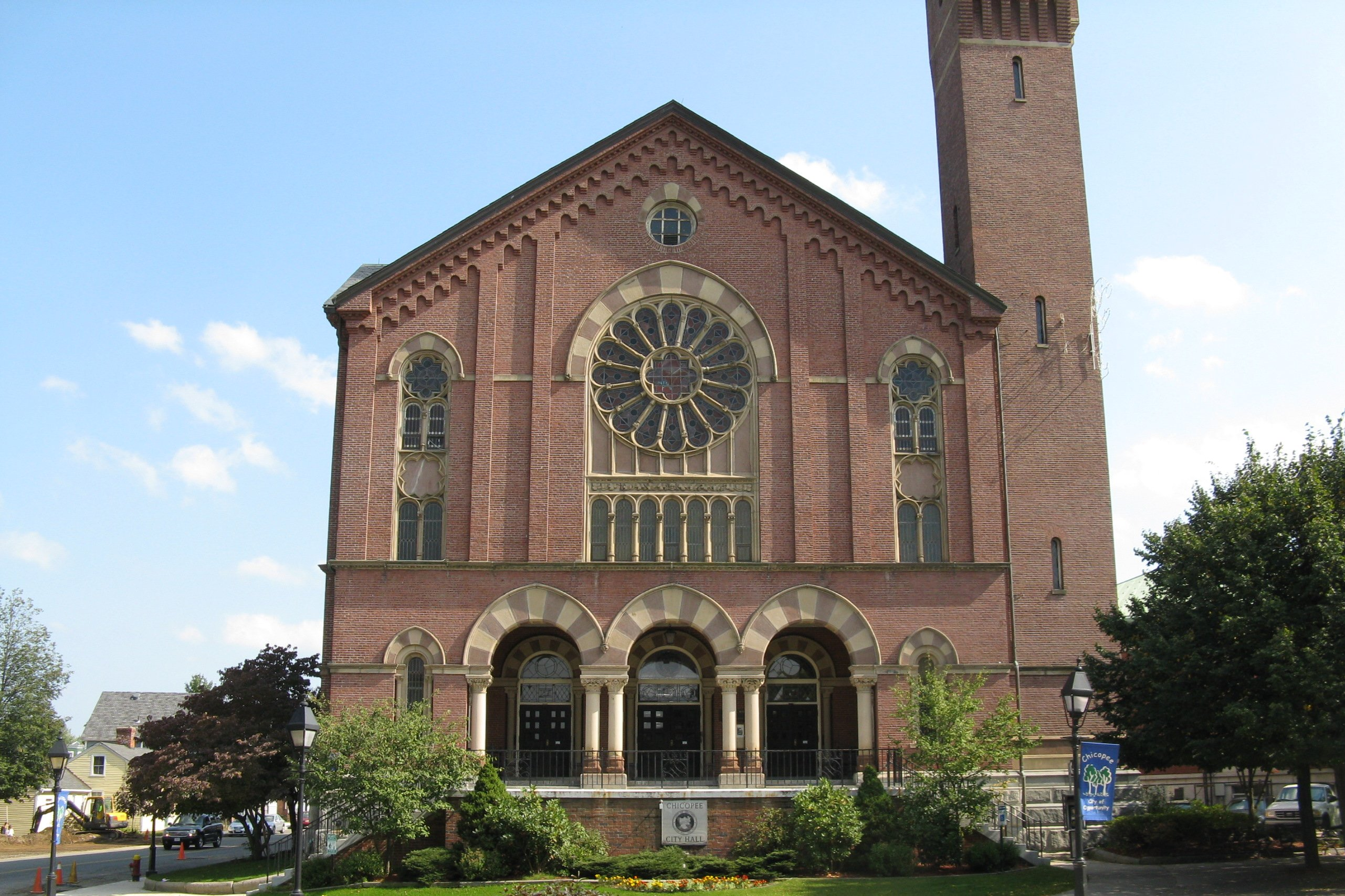
City Hall in 2009

City Hall is a historic city hall in Chicopee, Massachusetts. Located in the heart of Chicopee at Market Square, the building (built 1871) is in the Italianate style, with a rose window (usually associated with churches) and a 147-foot (45 m) tower modeled on that of the Palazzo Vecchio in Florence, Italy. It was designed by Charles Edward Parker.

== History and architecture ==
Chicopee purchased land from the Ames Manufacturing Company in 1869 as a site for its new city hall, and a committee of leading citizens was established to oversee its design and construction. The committee selected Charles E. Parker of Boston to design the new building, and construction took place in 1871. Parker's design was modelled on the Palazzo Vecchio, the historic town hall of Florence in Tuscany, Italy. The building was dedicated on December 21, 1871.

By far the most prominent feature of the building is its 147-foot (45 m) tower, similar to its Florentine inspiration. It is topped by a golden eagle statue weighing 54 pounds (24 kg) and having a 7-foot (2.1 m) wingspan. The tower houses a bell, which was historically used on public occasions and to announce fire alarms. A clock mechanism was added in 1888, with faces on three of the tower's four sides.

The civic building is unusual for having a rose window, usually associated with churches and finished in stained glass.

The building continues to be used for city offices. The police station was originally located in the basement, but was moved in 1929 to a newly constructed annex before later being moved to the Chicopee Falls section of the city where it presently shares its own complex with the Chicopee Fire Department. The building was listed on the National Register of Historic Places in 1974.

As of 2020 the City Hall is undergoing a major external renovation project.

== See also ==
- National Register of Historic Places listings in Hampden County, Massachusetts
