= North Parish Church (North Andover, Massachusetts) =

Church in North Andover, Massachusetts, United States

Coordinates: 42.6842°N 71.1122°W

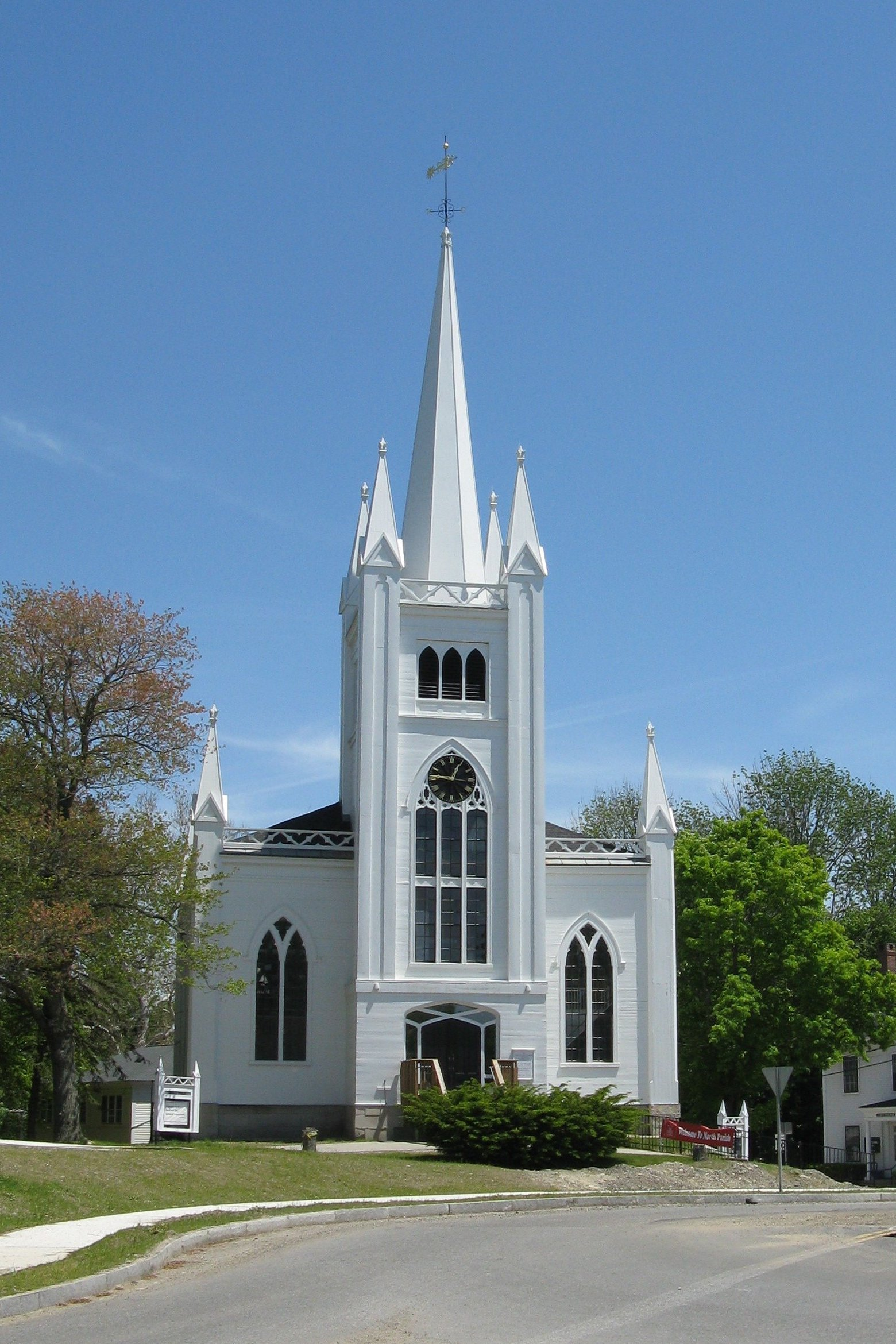
North Parish Church

North Parish Church is a historic church in North Andover, Massachusetts. It was designed by Richard Bond (architect) and built in 1836. The building's architecture is called Cardboard Gothic architecture. It is located at 190 Academy Road.
