= Evangelical Baptist Church (Newton, Massachusetts) =

Historic church in Massachusetts, United States

- U.S. National Register of Historic Places
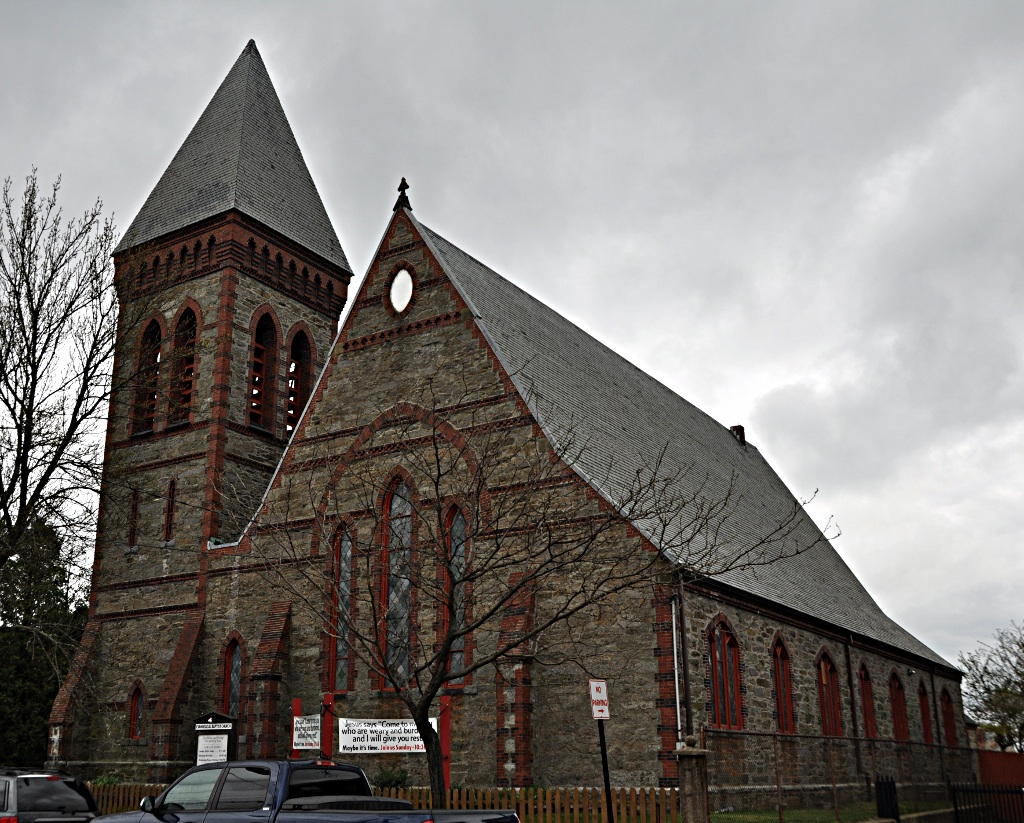

- Location within Massachusetts Location within the United States
- Location: Newton, Massachusetts
- Coordinates: 42°21′51.5″N 71°12′09.0″W
- Built: 1873
- Architect: Charles Edward Parker
- Architectural style: Gothic
- MPS: Newton MRA
- NRHP reference No.: 86001796
- Added to NRHP: September 4, 1986

The Evangelical Baptist Church is an historic church located at 23 Chapel Street, in the village of Nonantum in Newton, Massachusetts. Built in 1873 in Gothic Revival style, it was designed by noted Boston architect Charles Edward Parker, who in 1853 designed what today is the Architects Building of the Boston Society of Architects at 52 Broad Street, Boston. Evangelical Baptist Church was added to the National Register of Historic Places on September 4, 1986.

The Evangelical Baptist Church is still an active congregation.

== See also ==
- National Register of Historic Places listings in Newton, Massachusetts
