= Joshua Ward House =

Historic house in Massachusetts, United States

- U.S. National Register of Historic Places
- U.S. Historic district – Contributing property
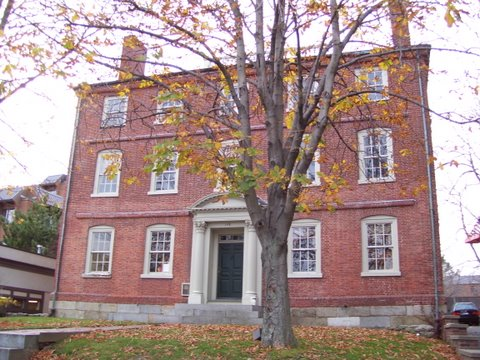

- Location within Massachusetts Location within the United States
- Location: 148 Washington Street, Salem, Massachusetts
- Coordinates: 42°31′13″N 70°53′48″W
- Built: 1784
- Architectural style: Federal
- Part of: Downtown Salem District (ID83003969)
- NRHP reference No.: 78000481

Significant dates
- Added to NRHP: February 8, 1978
- Designated CP: October 18, 1983

The Joshua Ward House is a historic house in Salem, Massachusetts. The three-story Federal style brick house, built in 1784, is one of the first brick houses in Salem. Its interior woodwork was done by noted Salem builder and woodworker Samuel McIntire, including an original staircase that is the oldest surviving staircase created by him. George Washington is reported to have specifically requested staying in this house when he visited Salem in 1789.

The building has an austere brick exterior laid in Flemish bond. Its four chimneys were damaged by storms in its early years, and again in the 1938 New England Hurricane. The house was used in the 19th century as a tavern. It was built on the same site as the former home of Sheriff George Corwin, famously associated with the Salem witch trials.

The house was listed on the National Register of Historic Places in 1978, and included in the Downtown Salem District in 1983.

In 2015 it was turned into a hotel.

== See also ==
- National Register of Historic Places listings in Salem, Massachusetts
- National Register of Historic Places listings in Essex County, Massachusetts
- List of historic houses in Massachusetts
