= Great Salem fire of 1914 =

Conflagration in the U.S. state of Massachusetts

Coordinates: 42°31′7.07″N 70°54′33.68″W

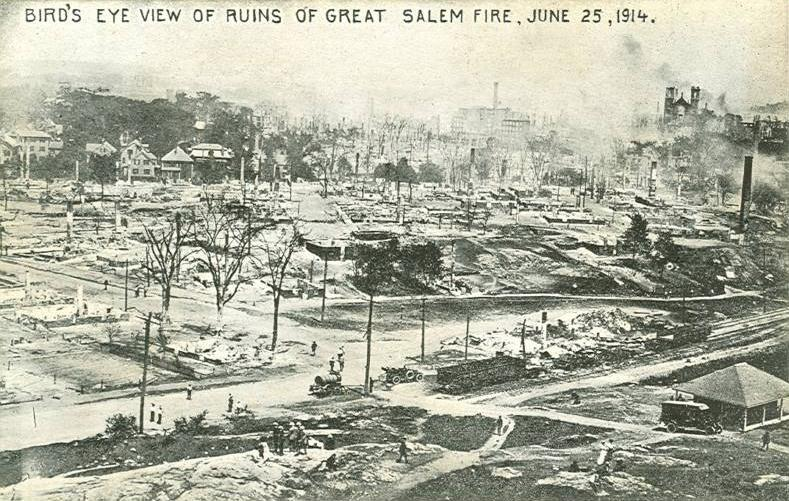
- Bird's-eye view of the ruins
- Date: June 25, 1914; 112 years ago
- Location: Salem, Massachusetts, U.S.
- Property damage: 1,376 buildings; $15 million

The Great Salem fire of 1914, on June 25–26, destroyed 1,376 buildings and made over 18,000 people homeless or jobless in Salem, Massachusetts, U.S.

It was among the last of the great industrial fires that plagued North American cities during the 19th century into the early 20th century. Of the families it affected – burning homes or the breadwinner's workplace – 43% were Franco-American. Because so many people were left jobless after the city's largest employer burned down, the fire encouraged the creation of the United States Employment Service.

== Before the fire ==
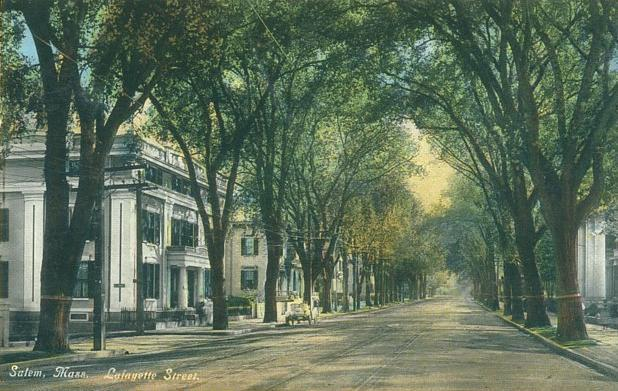
Lafayette Street in 1910, one of the longest and finest streets in the city. Much of it was lined with great elms planted in 1808, destroyed in the fire.

Franklin H. Wentworth, a Salem Councilman, agitated for more fire protection. In an article in the Salem Evening News (March 29, 1910, page 7), he called Salem, "in Danger of Destruction by Fire". He felt that the main fire danger was to the downtown business district. The article included a map of all downtown buildings and their type of materials.

Wentworth introduced an order that would have required all new or replacement roof coverings to be non-combustible. He argued that this was as important as buying new engines or hiring new firemen. After a big fire, many of the working class would have to live in tents, he warned.

Wentworth was accused of serving only the interest of the insurance industry, and the amendment did not pass. Wentworth later became secretary of the National Board of Fire Underwriters.

Another failed attempt to increase safety in Salem was undertaken by Charles J. Collins. He had visited Philadelphia where high-pressure wagons pumped water through 3.25 inches (8.3 cm) pipes for a range of 360 feet (110 m). The argument went that high-pressure pumps would pay for themselves with the reduction of insurance fees. Protecting the entire business and mercantile district would have cost $150,000.

In 1914, Salem was a city of 48,000 people (12,000 more than ten years earlier), and consisted of 5,826 buildings on 5,100 acres (21 km^{2}; 8.0 sq mi) at an assessed valuation of $37.25 million. The streets were 20 to 140 feet (6.1 to 42.7 m) wide. Building codes were dated, not mentioning standpipes, fire escapes, or sprinklers.

Salem had 180 fire alarm stations or boxes that could be used to contact telephone operators. A long drought preceded the events of June 25, 1914.

According to many sources as described by the History Channel, Giles Corey's apparition was seen shortly before the fire.

== The fire ==
The Great Salem Fire started with a series of explosions, caused by a mixture of acetone, amalacitate, alcohol, and celluloid. At 1:37 p.m. (EDT) on June 25, 1914, a fire alarm call box was used to report a fire in the Korn Leather Factory at 57 Boston Street. A memorial plaque is on the site, now occupied by a Walgreens store.

The fire spread quickly down and across Boston Street, due to a drought. The police department sent out calls to 21 other communities for assistance. One industrial department, the Fore River Shipyard, also assisted. Over 90 out-of-town policemen came to help.

A book authored by Arthur B. Jones of the Salem Fire Department provided a detailed list of the 21 area fire departments that assisted: Peabody, Beverly, Marblehead, Lynn, Swampscott, Boston, Chelsea, Wakefield, Danvers, Reading, Stoneham, Newburyport, Revere, Lawrence, Malden, Gloucester, Manchester, Medford, Hingham, Somerville, and Winchester. Firefighters and equipment from Fore River Shipyard in Quincy happened to be in Stoneham at the time of the fire, and responded from there. Firefighters from other area communities also responded to provide relief, including from Ipswich, Wenham, and Cambridge.

The Salem Evening News covered the events in a series of articles, which were later reprinted as a book by Montanye Perry.

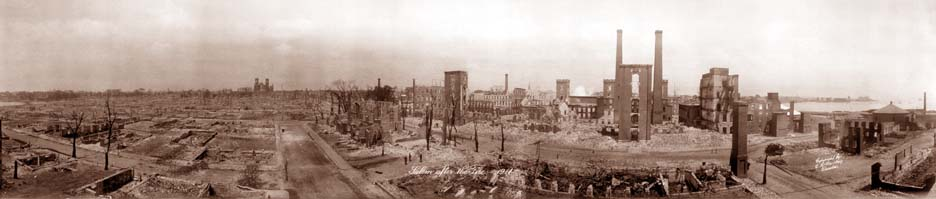
Salem after the fire

== Aftermath ==
The fire burned 253 acres (1.02 km^{2}; 0.395 sq mi) of land with 1,376 buildings. The entire loss was estimated at $15 million; insurance policies paid $11.744 million. Some 20,000 people lost their homes, 10,000 their jobs, and a few their lives.

Chestnut Street, designed by architect Samuel McIntire, survived the fire, as well as what is now City Hall, the oldest continually run city hall in America, open since 1837. The McIntire Historic District is the largest area of homes in America dating from 1642 to 1865.

Values in present-day terms
	Historical value (1914)	Adjusted for inflation
Estimated cost for equipping the entire business and mercantile district with high-pressure pumps	$150,000	$4.82 million
Assessed valuation of Salem prior to fire	$37.25 million	$1.2 billion
Damage	$15 million	$482 million
Covered by insurance	$11.744 million	$377 million
