= Candler Cottage =

Historic house in Massachusetts, United States

- U.S. National Register of Historic Places
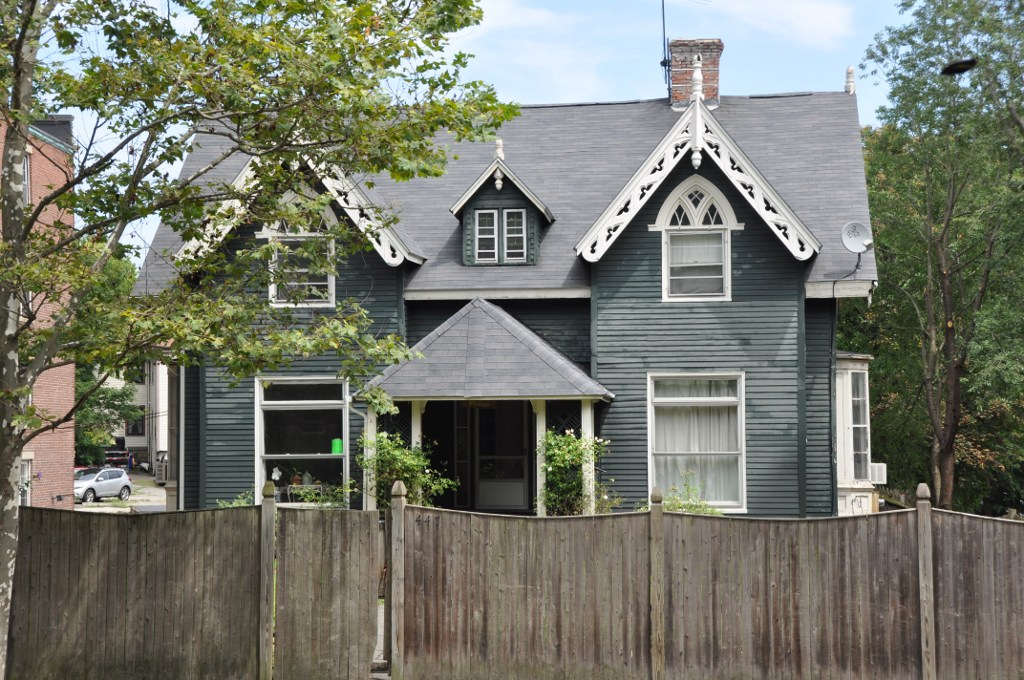

- Location within Massachusetts Location within the United States
- Location: 447 Washington St., Brookline, Massachusetts
- Coordinates: 42°20′8″N 71°7′31″W
- Area: less than one acre
- Built: 1850
- Architectural style: Gothic Revival
- MPS: Brookline MRA
- NRHP reference No.: 85003252
- Added to NRHP: October 17, 1985

The Candler Cottage is a historic house at 447 Washington Street in Brookline, Massachusetts. Built about 1850, it is one of the town's few examples of Gothic Revival architecture. It was listed on the National Register of Historic Places in 1985.

== Description and history ==
The Candler Cottage is located northwest of Brookline Village, on the east side of Washington Street near its junction with Greenough Street. It is set back from the street on a fenced lot surrounded by large multiunit residential buildings. It is a 1 1/2-story wood-frame structure, with a side-gable roof and clapboard siding. It has two gabled projecting sections flanking a central entrance sheltered by a hip-roofed porch. The gables have Gothic bargeboard decoration with drop pendants, and there are finials on the roof. The porch is supported by bracketed posts, with Chippendale-style Chinese screens between some of them. The front porch is probably a later addition, and the back of the house shows evidence of reconstruction after a fire.

The cottage was built c. 1850, for Mrs. John Candler, who moved to Brookline with her two sons in 1849 after her husband died. Both sons became merchants operating in Boston; John was also politically active, serving in the state legislature and several terms in the United States Congress. The house is one of a small number of Gothic Revival cottages in Brookline.

== See also ==
- National Register of Historic Places listings in Brookline, Massachusetts
