= City Hall (Salem, Massachusetts) =

- U.S. National Register of Historic Places
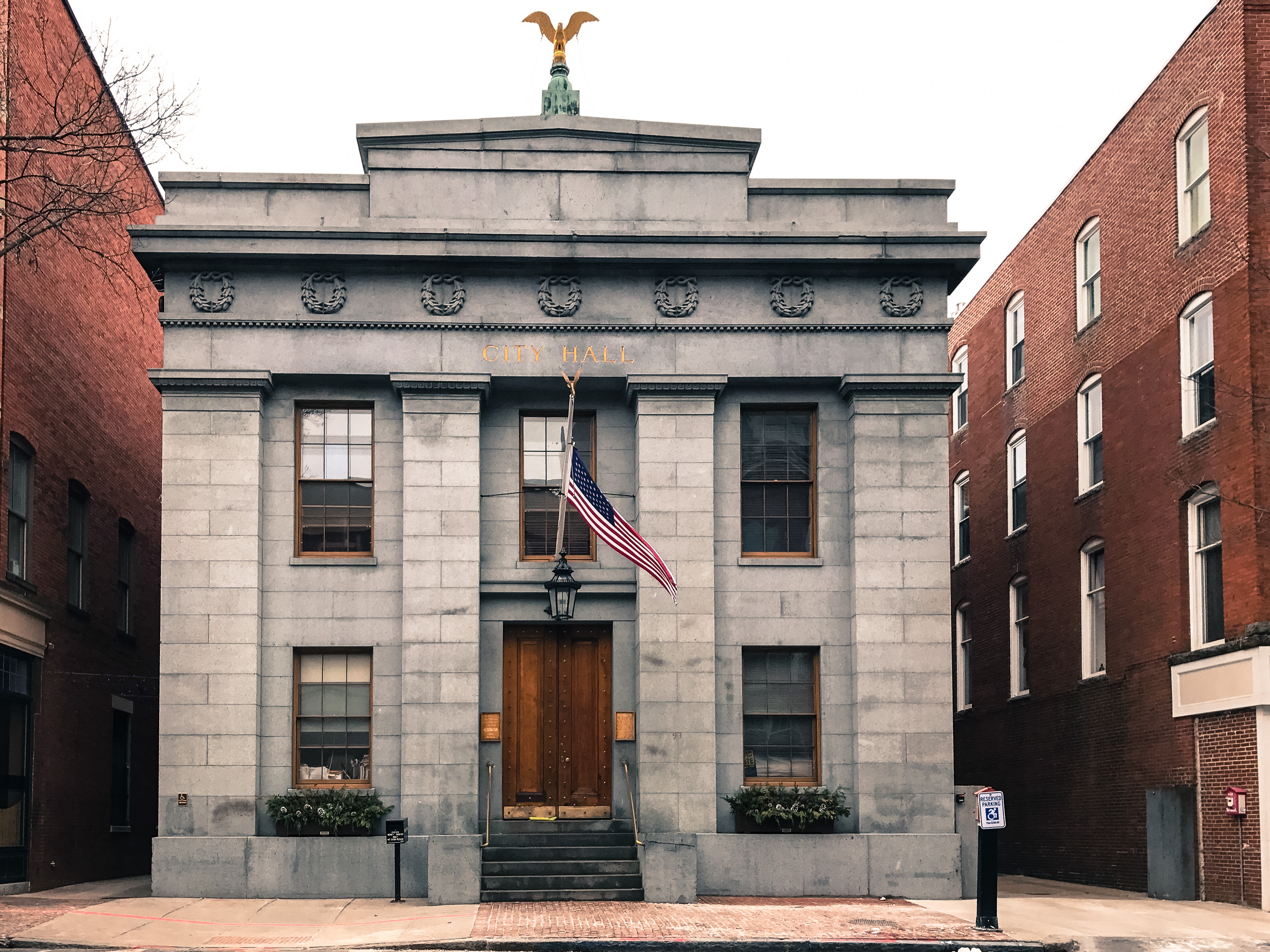
- City Hall

- Location within Massachusetts Location within the United States
- Location: 93 Washington Street, Salem, Massachusetts
- Coordinates: 42°31′19″N 70°53′45″W
- Built: 1838
- Architectural style: Greek Revival
- NRHP reference No.: 73000316
- Added to NRHP: April 3, 1973

City Hall is a historic government building located in the Downtown Salem District of Salem, Massachusetts.

The Greek Revival building was constructed in 1838, designed by architect Richard Bond (1797–1861). Salem City Hall was added to the National Register of Historic Places in 1973.

The City Council Chamber Room is located on the 2nd floor of Salem City Hall, serving as the site of bimonthly city council meetings and other regular board and commission meetings.

== History ==
City Hall was built in 1837–38 under the supervision of Mayor Leverett Saltonstall and a committee appointed for that purpose. The cornerstone was laid on September 6, 1837. Artifacts buried beneath the cornerstone included copies of local newspapers, the Mayor's speech for the organization of City Government (May 9, 1836), and the new City Charter. The building was enlarged in 1878 by an extension in the rear which did not alter its appearance from the street. The extension doubled the size of the building and brought all existing city offices under one roof.

In 1837, under the administration of President Andrew Jackson, the United States Treasury held a surplus in the amount of nearly $40 million. This surplus was distributed to the various states, which in turn distributed this money to the cities and towns. City Hall was built from this surplus revenue, as Salem's share was nearly $34,000. The building and furnishings cost approximately $22,878 and when finished, and this is perhaps one of the few municipal structures in existence paid for without taxing the citizens.

City Hall was first occupied by the City Council on the evening of May 31, 1838. A formal dedication was held on June 8, 1838.

Since 1837, the building has served as the focal point for the decision making process in Salem. This two-story building was designed and constructed in the style of Greek Revival. The original dimensions were 32 feet high, 45 feet wide and 68 feet long. The side and rear elevations are unadorned brick while the main facade is dressed granite. Three bays wide, this facade is broken by four giant pilasters, one on each corner and one on either side of the recessed center bay. The bays are set with tall windows, 6 over 6. The central entrance is reached by a short flight of granite steps; a cast iron lamp on a bracket projects from above. The tall front double doors are made of mahogany with brass studs outlining the center panels.

In 1979 an expansion was done to house city archives. In 2010, an exterior elevator was installed to the back of the 1979 expansion. Handicapped access was installed to help modernize an existing historic public facility and to make Salem City Hall accessible to people with disabilities. These improvements were paid for with $300,000 from the U.S. Government. In 2012 a $2 million restoration was begun that was to be completed in 2013. This renovation will be for total exterior work & the repairs will replace or repair the brick walls, roof and windows on Salem City Hall.

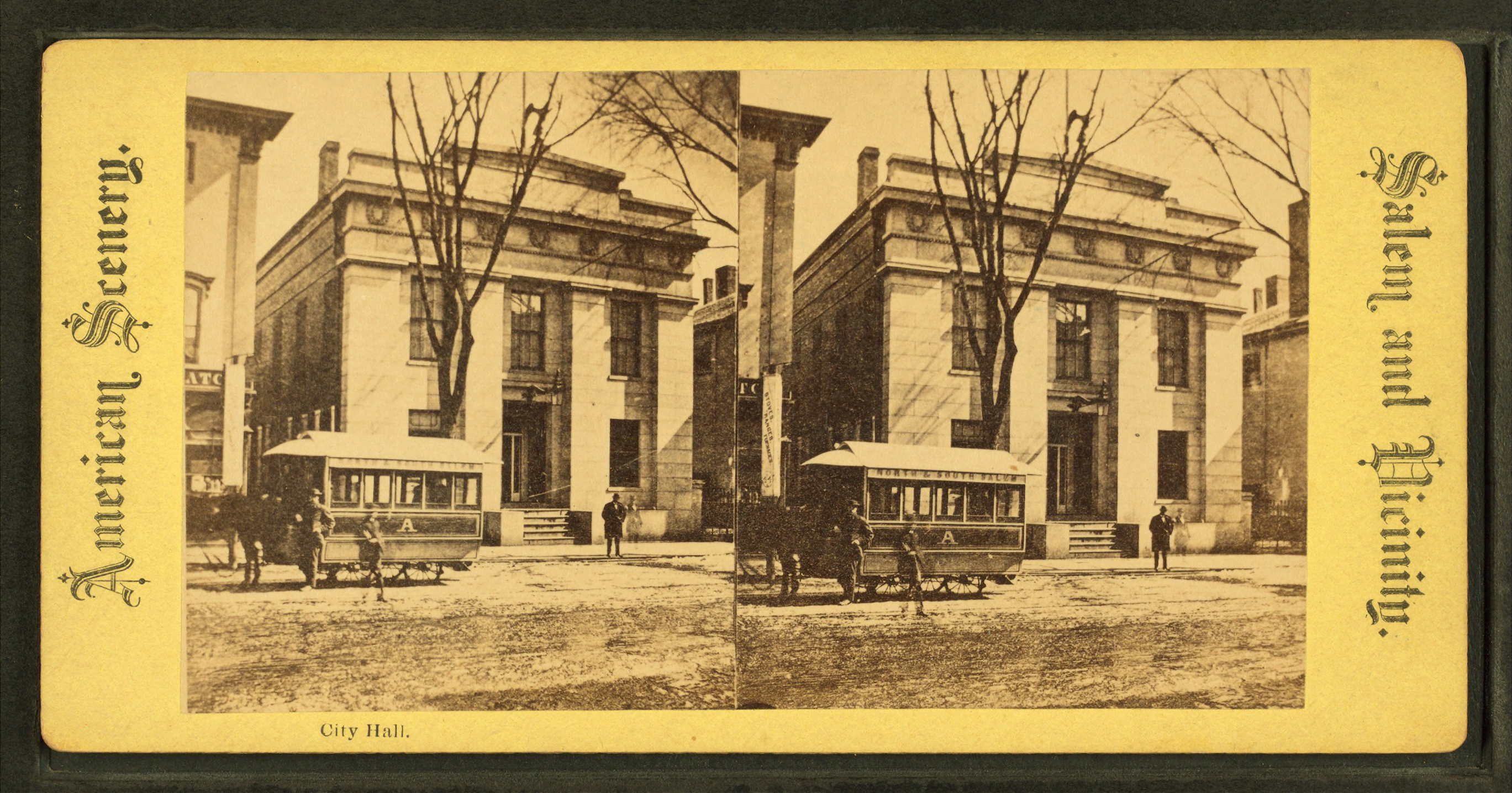
City Hall, built 1838 (photo later 19th century)

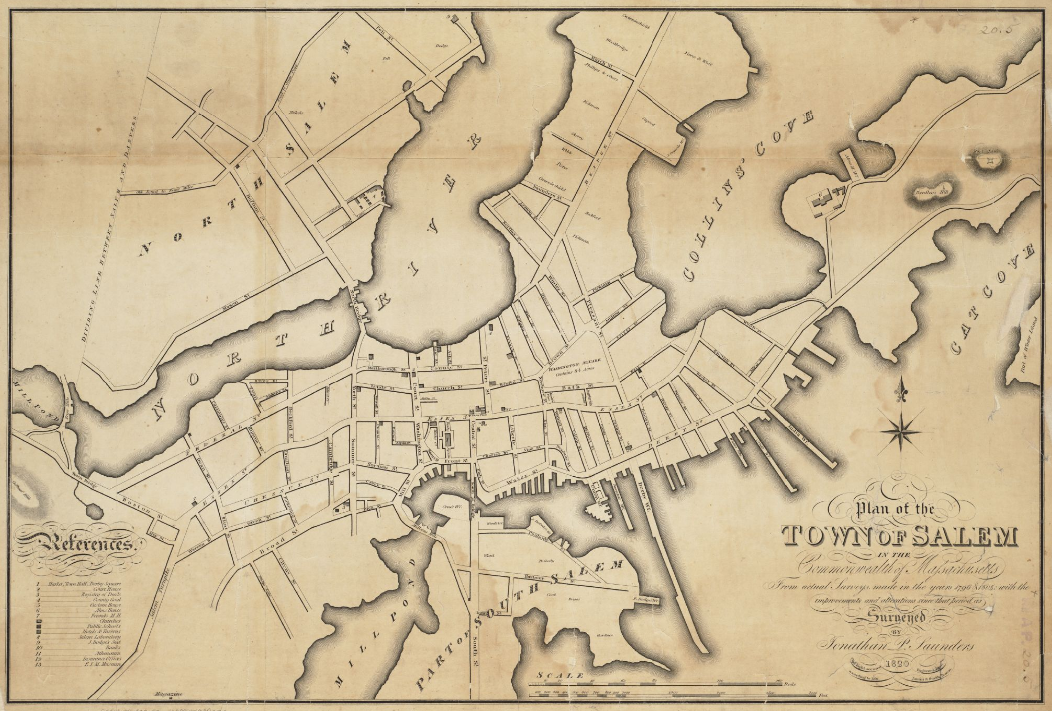
Salem – 1820

== See also ==
- National Register of Historic Places listings in Salem, Massachusetts
